= List of insect pests of millets =

Lists of plant diseases

This article contains a list of insect pests of millets primarily derived from Kalaisekar (2017).

== Millet species ==
All of the millet species listed below belong to the grass family, Poaceae. Most species generally referred to as millets belong to the subfamily Panicoideae, but some millets also belong to various other taxa. Major millets are in bold.

Eragrostideae tribe in the subfamily Chloridoideae:

- **Eleusine coracana**: Finger millet
- **Eragrostis tef**: Teff

Paniceae tribe in the subfamily Panicoideae:

- Genus Panicum:
  - **Panicum miliaceum**: Proso millet (common millet, broomcorn millet)
  - **Panicum sumatrense**: Little millet
- **Pennisetum glaucum**: Pearl millet
- **Setaria italica**: Foxtail millet
- Genus Digitaria
  - **Digitaria exilis**: White fonio
  - Digitaria compacta: Raishan
- Genus Echinochloa: barnyard millets
  - Echinochloa esculenta: Japanese barnyard millet
  - **Echinochloa frumentacea**: Indian barnyard millet
  - Echinochloa crus-galli: Common barnyard grass
- **Paspalum scrobiculatum**: Kodo millet
- Genus Brachiaria
  - Brachiaria deflexa: Guinea millet
  - **Brachiaria ramosa**: Browntop millet

Andropogoneae tribe, also in the subfamily Panicoideae:

- **Sorghum bicolor**: Sorghum
- **Coix lacryma-jobi**: Job's tears

== Lepidoptera ==
- Family Crambidae
  - Leaf folders, Cnaphalocrocis
    - Rice leaf folder, Cnaphalocrocis medinalis
  - Cnaphalocrocis patnalis
  - Marasmia trapezalis
  - Spotted stem borer, Chilo partellus
  - Sugarcane stalk borer, Chilo auricilius
  - Sugarcane early shoot borer, Chilo infuscatellus
  - Sugarcane internode borer, Chilo sacchariphagus
  - Asian corn borer, Ostrinia furnacalis
  - Millet stem borer, Coniesta ignefusalis
  - Corn borer, Diatraea grandiosella
- Family Erebidae
  - Subfamily Arctiinae
    - Amsacta albistriga
    - Amsacta lactinea
    - Amsacta moorei
    - Barsine roseororatus
    - Creatonotos gangis
    - Conogethes punctiferalis
    - Cyana horsfieldi
    - Spilosoma obliqua
  - Subfamily Lymantriinae (hairy caterpillars)
    - Euproctis limbalis
    - Yellow-tail moth, Euproctis similis
    - Euproctis virguncula
    - Tussock moths
      - Arna micronides
      - Nygmia amplior
      - Orvasca subnotata
- Family Hesperiidae
  - Rice skipper butterfly, Pelopidas mathias
- Family Noctuidae
  - Black cutworm, Agrotis ipsilon
  - Sesamia inferens
  - African maize stalk borer, Busseola fusca
  - Subfamily Hadeninae (armyworms)
    - Mythimna spp.
      - Mythimna separata
      - Mythimna loreyi
  - Subfamily Noctuinae (armyworms)
    - Spodoptera spp.
    - African armyworm, Spodoptera exempta
    - Red tef worm, Mentaxya ignicollis
  - Subfamily Heliothinae
    - Cotton bollworm, Helicoverpa armigera
    - Millet head miner moth, Heliocheilus albipunctella
  - Subfamily Acontiinae
    - Autoba silicula
  - Subfamily Aganainae
    - Asota plaginota
  - Subfamily Catocalinae
    - Mocis frugalis
- Family Pyralidae
  - Subfamily Galleriinae
    - African sugarcane stalk borer, Eldana saccharina
  - Subfamily Phycitinae
    - Honey dew moth, Cryptoblabes gnidiella
    - Green-striped borer, Maliarpha separatella

== Diptera ==
- Family Cecidomyiidae (midges)
  - Sorghum midge, Stenodiplosis sorghicola
  - Millet midge, Geromyia penniseti
- Family Muscidae
  - Shoot flies, Atherigona
    - Atherigona approximata (pearl millet shoot fly): affects Pennisetum typhoides, Sorghum bicolor
    - Atherigona atripalpis (foxtail millet shoot fly): affects Setaria italica
    - Atherigona biseta: affects Setaria italica, Setaria viridis
    - Atherigona falcata (barnyard millet shoot fly): affects Echinochloa colona, Echinochloa frumentacea, Echinochloa stagnina, Panicum sumatrense
    - Atherigona hyalinipennis (teff shoot fly)
    - Atherigona miliaceae (finger millet shoot fly or little millet shoot fly): affects Panicum miliaceum, Panicum sumatrense
    - Atherigona naqvii (wheat stem fly): affects Triticum aestivum, Zea mays
    - Atherigona orientalis (tomato fly or pepper fruit fly)
    - Atherigona oryzae (rice shoot fly): affects Oryza sativa, Paspalum scrobiculatum, Triticum aestivum, Zea mays
    - Atherigona pulla (proso millet shoot fly): affects Panicum miliaceum, Panicum sumatrense, Paspalum scrobiculatum, Setaria italica
    - Atherigona punctata (Coimbatore wheat stem fly): affects Triticum aestivum
    - Atherigona reversura (bermudagrass stem maggot): affects Cynodon dactylon (turf grasses)
    - Atherigona simplex (kodo millet shoot fly): affects Paspalum scrobiculatum
    - Atherigona soccata (sorghum shoot fly): affects Sorghum bicolor, Zea mays, Eleusine coracana

== Hemiptera ==
- Family Cicadellidae
  - Maize leafhopper, Cicadulina mbila
  - Rice green leafhopper, Nephotettix cincticeps
  - Leafhopper, Empoasca flavescens
- Family Delphacidae
  - Shoot bug, Peregrinus maidis
  - Brown planthopper, Nilaparvata lugens
  - Planthopper, Sogatella furcifera
- Family Derbidae
  - Planthopper, Proutista moesta
- Family Lophopidae
  - Sugarcane leafhopper, Pyrilla perpusilla
- Family Pseudococcidae
  - Rice mealybug, Brevennia rehi
- Family Cydnidae
  - Burrowing bugs, Stibaropus
- Family Alydidae
  - Paddy earhead bug, Leptocorisa acuta
  - Riptortus linearis
- Family Coreidae
  - Rice stink bug, Cletus punctiger
  - Leptoglossus phyllopus
- Family Blissidae
  - Chinch bugs, Blissus leucopterus
- Family Lygaeidae
  - False chinch bug, Nysius niger
  - Spilostethus pandurus
  - Spilostethus hospes
- Family Meenoplidae
  - Plant hopper, Nisia atrovenosa
- Family Miridae
  - Sorghum head bug, Calocoris angustatus
  - Eurystylus bellevoyei
  - Creontiades pallidus
- Family Pentatomidae
  - Stink bug, Dolycoris indicus
  - Green stink bug, Nezara viridula
- Family Pyrrhocoridae
  - Red cotton bug, Dysdercus koenigii
- Family Pseudococcidae
  - Rice mealybug, Brevennia rehi
- Family Aphididae (aphids)
  - Sugarcane aphid, Melanaphis sacchari
  - Corn aphid, Rhopalosiphum maidis
  - Anoecia spp.
    - Anoecia corni
    - Anoecia cornicola
    - Anoecia krizusi
    - Anoecia vagans
  - Aphis fabae
  - Aphis gossypii
  - Aphis spiraecola
  - Brachycaudus helichrysi
  - Sugarcane woolly aphid, Ceratovacuna lanigera
  - Diuraphis noxia
  - Forda formicaria
  - Forda marginata
  - Forda hirsuta
  - Forda orientalis
  - Geoica lucifuga
  - Geoica utricularia
  - Mealy plum aphid, Hyalopterus pruni
  - Rusty plum aphid, Hysteroneura setariae
  - Melanaphis pyraria
  - Melanaphis sorghi
  - Rose-grass aphid, Metopolophium dirhodum
  - Myzus persicae
  - Neomyzus circumflexus
  - Paracletus cimiciformis
  - Protaphis middletonii
  - Rhopalosiphum nymphaeae
  - Rhopalosiphum padi
  - Rhopalosiphum rufiabdominale
  - Greenbug, Schizaphis graminum
  - Yellow sorghum aphid, Sipha flava
  - Sipha elegans
  - Sipha maydis
  - Sitobion africanum
  - Sitobion avenae
  - Sitobion graminis
  - Sitobion indicum
  - Sitobion leelamaniae
  - Indian grain aphid, Sitobion miscanthi
  - Sitobion pauliani
  - Smynthurodes betae
  - Tetraneura spp.
    - Tetraneura nigriabdominalis
    - Tetraneura africana
    - Tetraneura caerulescens
    - Tetraneura chui
    - Tetraneura basui
    - Tetraneura javensis
    - Tetraneura capitata
    - Tetraneura triangula

== Thrips (Thysanoptera) ==
- Chaetanaphothrips orchidii
- Florithrips traegardhi
- Haplothrips aculeatus
- Heliothrips indicus
- Selenothrips rubrocinctus
- Sorghothrips jonnaphilus
- Stenchaetothrips biformis
- Thrips hawaiiensis

== Coleoptera ==
- Flea beetles (Chrysomelidae)
  - Altica cyanea
  - Altica caerulea
  - Chaetocnema basalis
  - Phyllotreta spp.
- Leaf beetles (Chrysomelidae)
  - Cereal leaf beetle, Oulema melanopus
  - Aulacophora foveicollis
  - Rice hispa, Dicladispa armigera
  - Tef epilachna beetle, Chnootriba similis
- Blister beetles (Meloidae)
  - Cylindrothorax tenuicollis
  - Mylabris pustulata
- Scarabaeidae
  - White grubs, Phyllophaga spp. and Holotrichia spp.
  - Chafer beetles
    - Chiloloba acuta
    - Oxycetonia versicolor
    - Torynorrhina flammea
- False wireworms (Tenebrionidae)
  - Gonocephalum
- Weevils (Curculionidae)
  - Ash weevil, Myllocerus
  - Argentine stem weevil, Listronotus bonariensis
  - Leaf weevil, Tanymecus indicus

== Orthoptera ==
- Acrididae
  - Acrida exaltata
  - Aiolopus longicornis
  - Diabolocatantops axillaris
  - Hieroglyphus banian
  - Hieroglyphus nigrorepletus
  - Hieroglyphus daganensis
  - Locusta migratoria
  - Red locust, Nomadacris septemfasciata
  - Oedaleus senegalensis
  - Oxya nitidula
  - Paracinema tricolor
  - Schistocerca gregaria
- Pyrgomorphidae
  - Atractomorpha crenulata
  - Chrotogonus hemipterus
- Tettigoniidae
  - Conocephalus maculatus
  - Wello-bush cricket, Decticoides brevipennis
  - Armored bush cricket, Acanthoplus longipes

== Termites (Isoptera) ==
- Odontotermes obesus
- Microtermes obesi

== Hymenoptera ==
- Wasps (Eurytomidae)
  - Stem boring wasp, Eurytomocharis eragrostidis
- Ants (Formicidae)
  - Monomorium salomonis

== See also ==
- List of pearl millet diseases
- List of sorghum diseases
