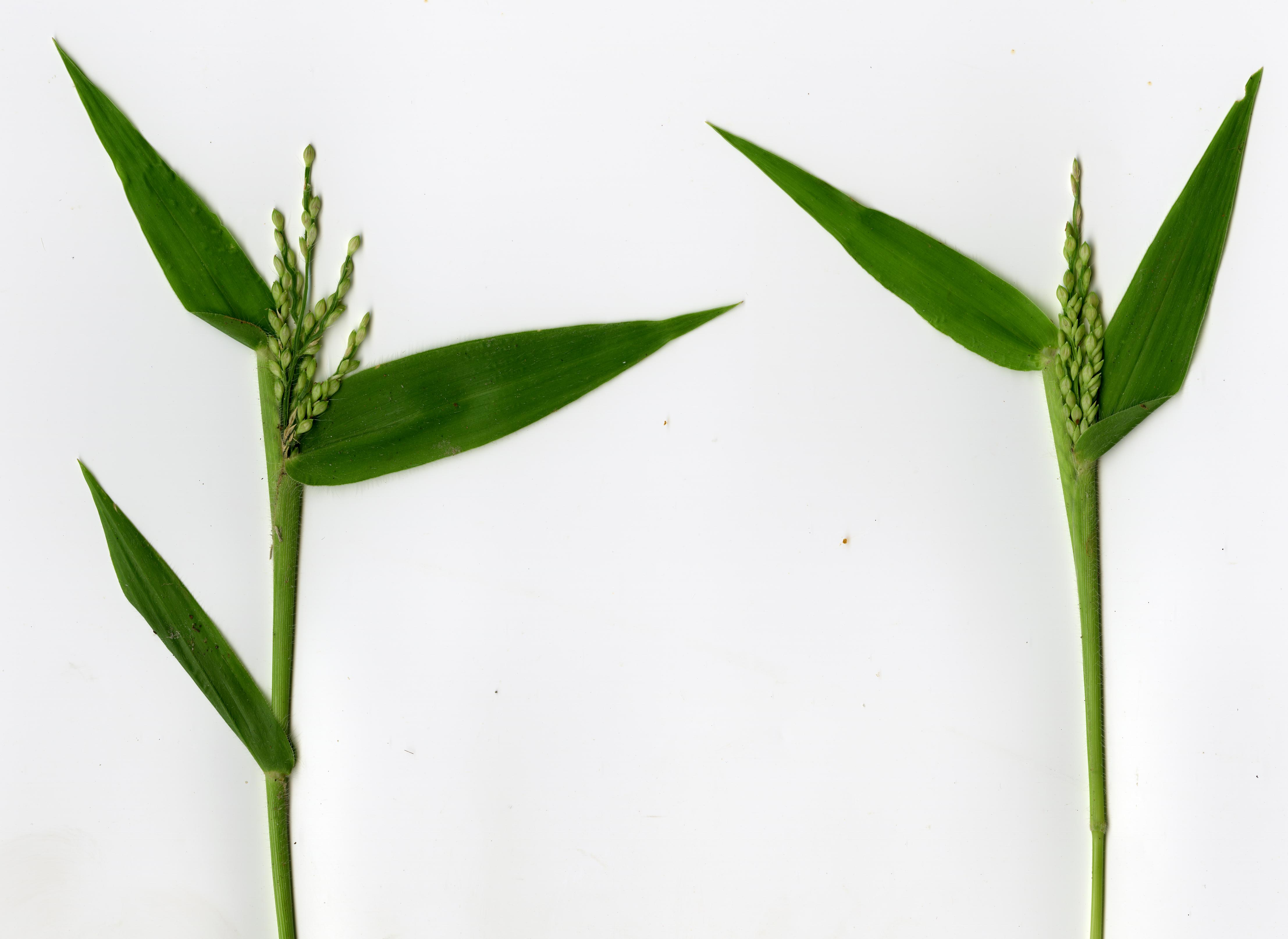
- Urochloa ramosa (formerly Brachiaria ramosa) from Ambanja, Madagascar

Scientific classification
- Kingdom: Plantae
- Clade: Tracheophytes
- Clade: Angiosperms
- Clade: Monocots
- Clade: Commelinids
- Order: Poales
- Family: Poaceae
- Subfamily: Panicoideae
- Genus: Urochloa
- Species: U. ramosa

Binomial name
- Urochloa ramosa (L.) T.Q.Nguyen

Synonyms
- List: Brachiaria chennaveeraiana Basappa & Muniy. in Proc. Indian Natl. Sci. Acad., B 49: 378 (1983); Brachiaria marselinii Gawade & Gavade in J. Bombay Nat. Hist. Soc. 101: 291 (2004); Brachiaria multispiculata H.Scholz in Willdenowia 12: 287 (1982); Brachiaria ramosa (L.) Stapf in D.Oliver & auct. suc. (eds.), Fl. Trop. Afr. 9: 542 (1919); Brachiaria ramosa var. pubescens Basappa & Muniy. in Proc. Indian Natl. Sci. Acad., B 49: 380 (1983); Brachiaria regularis var. nidulans (Mez) Täckh. in Bull. Fac. Sci. Egypt. Univ. 17: 432 (1941); Echinochloa ramosa (L.) Roberty in Fl. Ouest-Afr.: 398 (1954); Panicum arvense Kunth in Révis. Gramin. 2: t. 109 (1831); Panicum bispiculatum Chiov. in Annuario Reale Ist. Bot. Roma 8: 303 (1908 publ. 1907), pro syn.; Panicum brachylachnum Steud. in Syn. Pl. Glumac. 1: 62 (1853); Panicum breviradiatum Hochst. in Flora 38: 195 (1855); Panicum canescens Roth in J.J.Roemer & J.A.Schultes, Syst. Veg., ed. 15[bis]. 2: 457 (1817); Panicum cognatissimum Steud. in Syn. Pl. Glumac. 1: 69 (1853); Panicum crus-galli var. petiveri (Trin.) De Wild. & T.Durand in Ann. Mus. Congo Belge, Bot., sér. 2, 1(2): 72 (1900); Panicum grossarium J.Koenig in Naturforscher (Halle) 23: 205 (1788), nom. illeg.; Panicum nidulans Mez in Bot. Jahrb. Syst. 34: 136 (1904); Panicum ozogonum Steud. in Syn. Pl. Glumac. 1: 68 (1853); Panicum pallidum Peter in Abh. Preuss. Akad. Wiss., Phys.-Math. Kl., n.f., 13(2): 45 (1928); Panicum petiveri Trin. in Gram. Panic.: 144 (1826); Panicum petiveri var. puberulum Chiov. in Annuario Reale Ist. Bot. Roma 8: 302 (1908 publ. 1907); Panicum ramosum L. in Mant. Pl. 1: 29 (1767); Panicum sorghum Steud. in Syn. Pl. Glumac. 1: 58 (1853); Panicum supervacuum C.B.Clarke in J. Linn. Soc., Bot. 24: 407 (1888); Setaria canescens (Roth) Kunth in Révis. Gramin. 1: 47 (1829); Urochloa ramosa var. pubescens (Basappa & Muniy.) E.A.Kellogg in PhytoKeys 163: 293 (2020); Urochloa supervacua (C.B.Clarke) Noltie in Edinburgh J. Bot. 56: 394 (1999)

= Urochloa ramosa =

Species of grass

Urochloa ramosa, (formerly Brachiaria ramosa) the browntop millet or Dixie signalgrass, is an annual, millet grass belonging to the grass family (Poaceae). The native range of Urochloa ramosa is from Africa to tropical and subtropical Asia.

== Description ==
It has glabrous (hairless) spikelets, are about 3.3 mm (0.1 in) long, the upper of each pair on a pedicel (stalk) about as long as the spikelet. The spikelets are more often slightly or distinctly puberulent and pedicels are often shorter. Plants found in Malesia and Australia always have shorter spikelets (only up to 3 mm long).

== Growth ==
Seed germination can happen in up to 5 days and the rapidly growing crop can then be harvested in the next two months. Its fine stems and leaves allow the plant to dry sufficiently to be used as a dry hay product.

== Taxonomy ==
It was originally published as Brachiaria ramosa (L.) Stapf in D.Oliver & auct. suc. (eds.), Fl. Trop. Afr. 9: 542 in 1919, before being renamed and published and described by botanist T.Q.Nguyen in Novosti Sist. Vyssh. Rast. 3: 13 in 1966.

The specific epithet, ramosa, is a Latin adjective meaning "branched" which describes the plant as bearing branches.

The reconstructed Proto-Dravidian name for Brachiaria ramosa is *conna-l.

It is named differently in Indian languages such as “korale” and “kadu-baragu” in Kannada, “andakorra” and “pedda-sama” in Telugu.

== Distribution ==
It is found in Afghanistan, Andaman Islands, Bangladesh, Benin, Burkina, Cambodia, Cameroon, Cape Verde, Chad, China, Djibouti, East Himalaya, Egypt, Eritrea, Ethiopia, Gambia, Guinea-Bissau, Gulf States, Hainan, India, Ivory Coast, Java, Kenya, Lesser Sunda Islands, Liberia, Malawi, Malaya, Mali, Mauritania, Mozambique, Myanmar, Nepal, New Guinea, Nicobar Islands, Niger, Nigeria, Northern Provinces (South Africa), Oman, Pakistan, Philippines, Saudi Arabia, Senegal, (island of) Socotra, Somalia, Sri Lanka, Sudan, Tanzania, Thailand, Vietnam, West Himalaya, Yemen and Zimbabwe.

It has been introduced to parts of the United States (Alabama, Arkansas, Florida, Georgia, Hawaii, Illinois, Kentucky, Louisiana, Maryland, Mississippi, North Carolina, South Carolina, Tennessee, Texas and Virginia), South America (Peru), Africa (Madagascar, Mauritius, the island of Réunion), and parts of Australia, (Christmas Island, Northern Territory, Queensland and Western Australia).

In parts of America, it is considered an invasive weed, as it has been found to reduce yield and lower quality of cotton in the southeastern United States.

== Uses ==
In South Asia, it is traditionally cultivated as a cereal crop. It is used because it has potential to give high yield in resource-poor and fragile ecological conditions. In the southern parts of India, the grains of browntop millet from non-shattering varieties are consumed as boiled whole grain (like rice), porridge, kheer or unleavened bread and dosa.

The grain is also used as a birdseed, and forage crop (in the US) for domestic animals and game animals (such as deer and rabbit) and for birds such as turkey, duck, dove, quail and pheasant. Browntop millet can represent up to 10–25% of the diet of terrestrial and water birds. Also 50% of ingested seed found in mourning dove's crops was browntop millet. Urochloa ramosa is also used to suppress root-knot nematode populations in tomato and pepper crops in south-eastern states of America.

Urochloa ramosa also has the ability to accumulate significant amounts of metals such as lead and zinc in its shoot and root tissues making it an important plant for remediation of contaminated soils (Lakshmi et al., 2013).

== Pests ==
It is affected by insect pests such as:

- shoot flies Atherigona oryzae, Atherigona pulla, and Atherigona punctata
- caseworm Parapoynx stagnalis
- red hairy caterpillars Amsacta albistriga and Amsacta moorei

Within the US, army worms (Mythimna unipuncta) and grasshoppers are the common insect problems.
