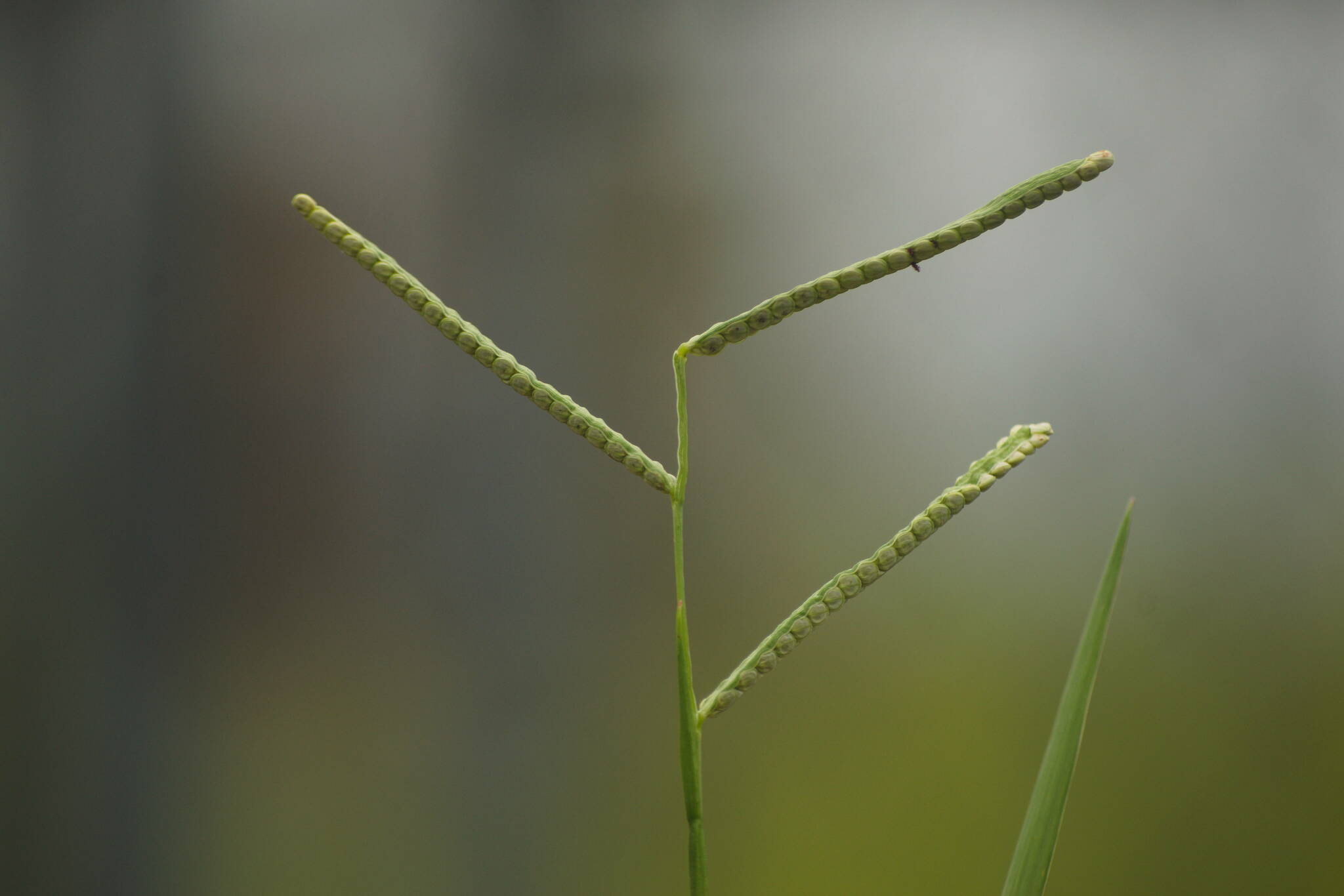

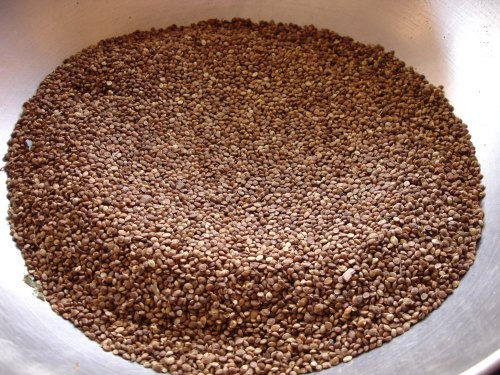

Scientific classification
- Kingdom: Plantae
- Clade: Tracheophytes
- Clade: Angiosperms
- Clade: Monocots
- Clade: Commelinids
- Order: Poales
- Family: Poaceae
- Subfamily: Panicoideae
- Genus: Paspalum
- Species: P. scrobiculatum

Binomial name
- Paspalum scrobiculatum L.

Synonyms
- Panicum frumentaceum Rottb.

= Paspalum scrobiculatum =

Species of grass

Paspalum scrobiculatum, commonly called kodo millet or koda millet, is an annual grain that is grown primarily in Nepal (not to be confused with ragi (finger millet, Eleusine coracana)) and also in India, Philippines, Indonesia, Vietnam, Thailand, and in West Africa from where it originated. It is grown as a minor crop in most of these areas, with the exception of the Deccan plateau in India where it is grown as a major food source. It is a very hardy crop that is drought tolerant and can survive on marginal soils where other crops may not survive, and can supply 450–900 kg of grain per hectare. Kodo millet has large potential to provide nourishing food to subsistence farmers in Africa and elsewhere.

The plant is called kodrava in Sanskrit, Arikelu in the Telugu language, Varagu in Tamil, Varak (വരക്) in Malayalam, Arka in Kannada, Kodo in Hindi and Nepali, and Kodra in Punjabi.

== Description ==
Kodo millet is a monocot and an annual grass that grows to heights of approximately four feet. It has an inflorescence that produces 4–6 racemes that are 4–9 cm long. Its slender, light green leaves grow to be 20 to 40 centimeters in length. The seeds it produces are very small and ellipsoidal, being approximately 1.5 mm in width and 2 mm in length; they vary in colour from being light brown to a dark grey. Kodo millet has a shallow root system that may be ideal for intercropping.

== History, geography, and ethnography ==
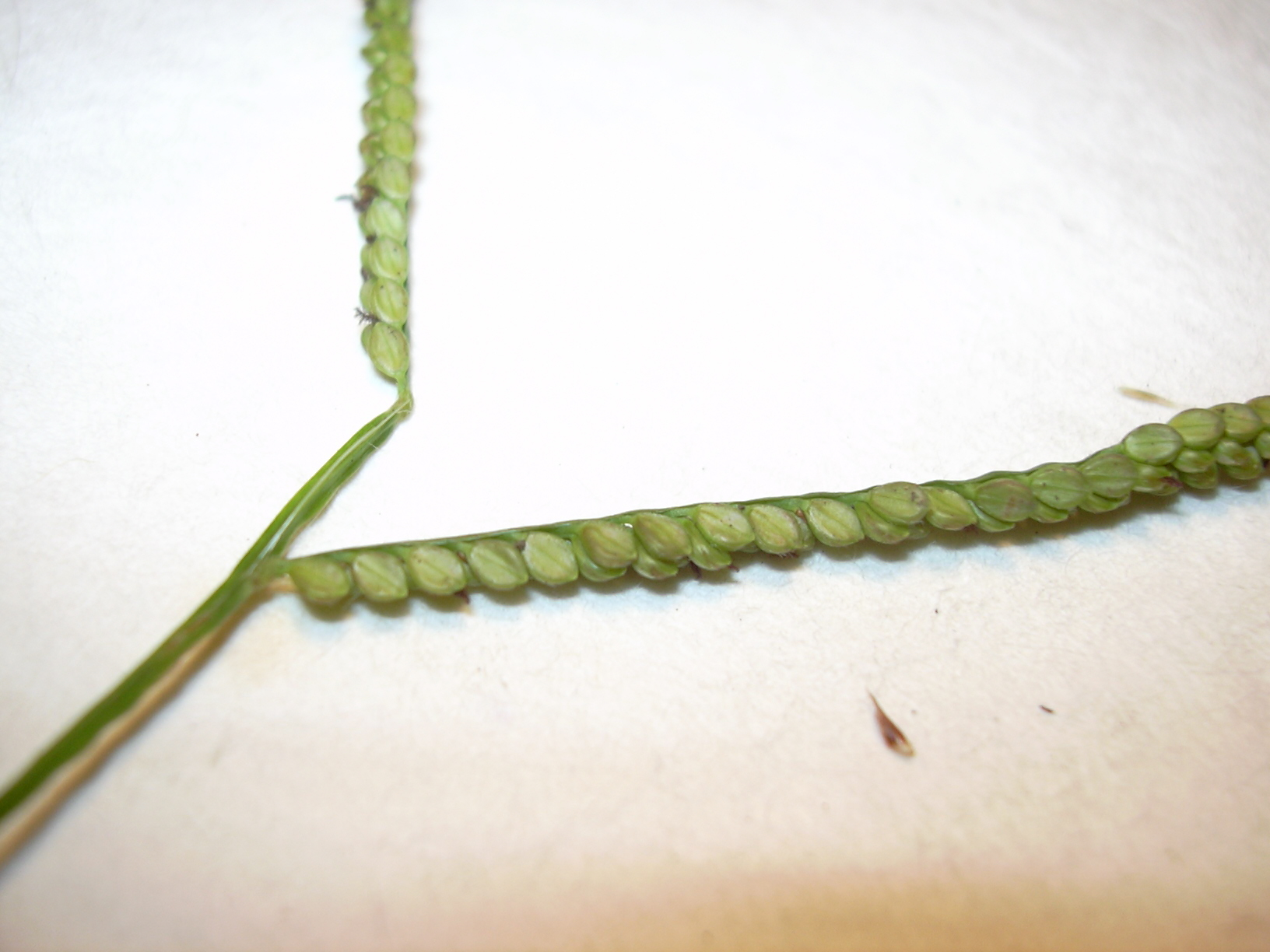
Inflorescences

Paspalum scrobiculatum var. scrobiculatum is grown in India as an important crop, while Paspalum scrobiculatum var. commersonii is the wild variety indigenous to Africa. The kodo millet, also known as cow grass, rice grass, ditch millet, Native paspalum, or Indian crown grass originates in tropical Africa, and it is estimated to have been domesticated in India 3000 years ago. The domestication process is still ongoing. In southern India, it is called varaku or koovaraku. Kodo is probably a corrupt form of kodra, a Hindi name of the plant. It is grown as an annual. It is a minor food crop eaten in many Asian countries, primarily in India where in some regions it is extremely important. It grows wild as a perennial in the west of Africa, where it is eaten as a famine food. Often it grows as a weed in rice fields. Many farmers do not mind it, as it can be harvested as an alternative crop if their primary crop fails. In the Southern United States and Hawaii, it is considered to be a noxious weed.

== Growing conditions ==
Kodo millet is propagated from seed, ideally in row planting instead of broadcast sowing. Its preferred soil type is a very fertile, clay-based soil. Var. scrobiculatum is better suited to dried conditions than its wild counterpart, which requires approximately 800–1200 mm of water annually and is well suited to sub-humid aridity conditions. With very low competition from other plants or weeds for nutrients, it can grow well in poor-nutrient soils. However, it does best in soils supplemented with a general fertilizer. The recommended dose for optimal growth is 40 kg of nitrogen plus 20 kg of phosphorus per hectare. A case study in India's Rewa district in 1997 showed a 72% increase in kodo millet grain yields as opposed to no fertilizer. Lodging issues may accompany this (see § Other farming issues). Kodo millet prefers full light for optimal growth, but can tolerate some partial shading. Its ideal temperature for growth is 25–27 °C. It requires four months until maturity and harvesting.

== Other farming issues ==
The kodo millet is prone to lodging at maturity, causing loss of grain. To prevent this, limited fertilization is recommended. While plenty of fertilizer dramatically improves yields, there is the risk of lodging accompanying vigorous growth. A good balance is applying 14–22 kg of nitrogen. Lodging also occurs due to heavy rains. Kodo millet is harvested by cutting the stalk of the grass and allowing it to dry in the sun for a day or two. It is then ground to remove the husk. Weather dependency is a major issue related to proper harvesting and storage. Additionally, threshing on roads damages the grains, and husking is a very time-consuming process. Kodo millets are believed by farmers to be the toughest grain to de-husk.

== Stress tolerance ==
The kodo millet can survive well on marginal soils; var. scrobiculatum requires very little water in order to grow, and thus has very good drought tolerance. It can be cultivated without an irrigation system. Farmyard manures provide adequate nutrients in terms of adding fertilizer, but kodo millets can still survive on low-nutrient soils. The wild variety is better suited to wetter conditions, and can tolerate flooded areas and swampy ground.

== Major weeds, pests and diseases ==
Paspalum ergot is a fungal disease to which kodo millet is susceptible. Hardened masses of this fungus, called sclerotia, will grow in place of the millet grain. These compact fungi growths contain a chemical compound that is poisonous to humans and livestock if consumed, and potentially fatal. It causes damage to the central nervous system, causing excitability in animals and eventually loss of muscle control. If the symptoms are caught early and the animals are removed from the infected food, they have a good chance of recovery. Cleaning the seeds by winnowing them before storage may remove the fungal spores.

Insect pests include:

Shoot and stem feeders

- shoot fly Atherigona simplex (kodo millet shoot fly)
- Atherigona pulla, Atherigona oryzae, and Atherigona soccata
- pink borer Sesamia inferens

Leaf feeders

- leaf roller Cnaphalocrocis patnalis
- caseworm Hydrellia philippina
- armyworms Mythimna separata and Spodoptera mauritia
- skipper butterfly Pelopidas mathias
- thrip Stenchaetothrips biformis
- grasshopper Acrida exaltata

Sucking pests

- mealy bug Brevennia rehi
- green leafhopper Nephotettix nigropictus

Panicle pests

- green bug Nezara viridula, Dolycoris indicus
- earhead bug Leptocorisa acuta
- gall midge Orseolia spp.

== Consumption and uses ==
In India, kodo millet is ground into flour and used to make pudding. In Africa it is cooked like rice. It is also a good choice for animal fodder for cattle, goats, pigs, sheep, and poultry. In Hawaii, var. scrobiculatum is found to grow well on hillside slopes where other grasses do not flourish. It has the potential to be grown as a food source on hillside farms. It may also have potential to be used as grass ties on hillside plots to prevent soil erosion, while also providing a famine food as a secondary purpose. It has been noted that it makes a good cover crop.

== Nutritional information ==
Kodo millet is a nutritious grain and a good substitute for rice or wheat. The grain is composed of 11% of protein, providing 9 grams/100 g consumed. It is an excellent source of fibre at 10 grams (37–38%), as opposed to rice, which provides 0.2/100 g, and wheat, which provides 1.2/100 g. An adequate fibre source helps combat the feeling of hunger. Kodo millet contains 66.6 g of carbohydrates and 353 kcal per 100 g of grain, comparable to other millets. It also contains 3.6 g of fat per 100 g. It provides minimal amounts of iron, at 0.5/100 mg, and minimal amounts of calcium, and 27/100 mg. Kodo millets also contain high amounts of polyphenols, an antioxidant compound.

== Practical information ==
If fertilizer is available, supplemented nitrogen and phosphorus in limited amounts can increase yields dramatically. Before applying fertilizer, soil pH tests are used to make sure it is ideal for proper nutrient uptake. While pH levels can vary across fields, a few may be able to appropriate a rough guess. If pH levels are not suitable, fertilizer cannot be taken up by plants and will be wasted. Planting kodo millet in rows, instead of broadcasting the seeds, will increase yields and make weeding easier. Kodo millet will grow on marginal soils, but only if it has little competition from weeds. Finally, proper cleaning of the seeds by wind winnowing will help prevent the sclerotia of fungal diseases being consumed accidentally. Kodo millet seeds can be obtained from the International Crop Research Institute for the Semi-Arid Tropics.
