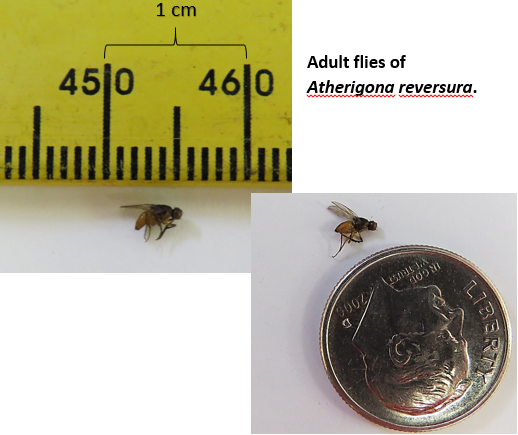
- Atherigona reversura

Scientific classification
- Kingdom: Animalia
- Phylum: Arthropoda
- Class: Insecta
- Order: Diptera
- Family: Muscidae
- Genus: Atherigona; Rondani, 1856

= Atherigona =

Genus of flies

Atherigona is a genus of flies in the family Muscidae.

== Pests ==
Larvae of some Atherigona species are important pests in cultivation of cereals, like rice and maize. Many are known as shoot flies. Some important species include:

- Atherigona approximata (pearl millet shoot fly): affects Pennisetum typhoides, Sorghum bicolor
- Atherigona atripalpis (foxtail millet shoot fly): affects Setaria italica
- Atherigona biseta: affects Setaria italica, Setaria viridis
- Atherigona falcata (barnyard millet shoot fly): affects Echinochloa colona, Echinochloa frumentacea, Echinochloa stagnina, Panicum sumatrense
- Atherigona hyalinipennis (teff shoot fly)
- Atherigona miliaceae (finger millet shoot fly or little millet shoot fly): affects Panicum miliaceum, Panicum sumatrense
- Atherigona naqvii (wheat stem fly): affects Triticum aestivum, Zea mays
- Atherigona orientalis (tomato fly or pepper fruit fly)
- Atherigona oryzae (rice shoot fly): affects Oryza sativa, Paspalum scrobiculatum, Triticum aestivum, Zea mays
- Atherigona pulla (proso millet shoot fly): affects Panicum miliaceum, Panicum sumatrense, Paspalum scrobiculatum, Setaria italica
- Atherigona punctata (Coimbatore wheat stem fly): affects Triticum aestivum
- Atherigona reversura (bermudagrass stem maggot): affects Cynodon dactylon (turf grasses)
- Atherigona simplex (kodo millet shoot fly): affects Paspalum scrobiculatum
- Atherigona soccata (sorghum shoot fly): affects Sorghum bicolor, Zea mays, Eleusine coracana

== Species ==
The following 299 species are recognized by Pont & Evenhuis, 2026:

- Atherigona aberrans
- Atherigona acutipennis
- Atherigona addita
- Atherigona adelinahae
- Atherigona africana
- Atherigona afrotropicalis
- Atherigona alaotrana
- Atherigona albiarista
- Atherigona albicornis
- Atherigona albistyla
- Atherigona alpha
- Atherigona alticola
- Atherigona ambulans
- Atherigona ancora
- Atherigona angolaensis
- Atherigona angulata
- Atherigona angustiloba
- Atherigona annobonensis
- Atherigona apicemaculata
- Atherigona approximata
- Atherigona arenga
- Atherigona aristalis
- Atherigona aster
- Atherigona ateripraepeda
- Atherigona atripalpis
- Atherigona atritergita
- Atherigona aurifacies
- Atherigona australis
- Atherigona basitarsalis
- Atherigona bedfordi
- Atherigona bella
- Atherigona bengalensis
- Atherigona beta
- Atherigona bidens
- Atherigona bidentata
- Atherigona bifida
- Atherigona bifurca
- Atherigona bifurcata
- Atherigona bimaculata
- Atherigona binubila
- Atherigona biseriata
- Atherigona biseta
- Atherigona bispina
- Atherigona bivittata
- Atherigona boninensis
- Atherigona bowdeni
- Atherigona brunneoapicata
- Atherigona brunnisquama
- Atherigona budongoana
- Atherigona campestris
- Atherigona capitulata
- Atherigona chirinda
- Atherigona chrysohypene
- Atherigona cinarina
- Atherigona clavata
- Atherigona cogani
- Atherigona collessi
- Atherigona confusa
- Atherigona conigera
- Atherigona contrastiloba
- Atherigona convexa
- Atherigona cornicauda
- Atherigona corrugata
- Atherigona crassibifurca
- Atherigona cristata
- Atherigona cryptica
- Atherigona cuanavaleensis
- Atherigona culicivora
- Atherigona dahlia
- Atherigona danbriensis
- Atherigona danielssoni
- Atherigona daviesi
- Atherigona decempilosa
- Atherigona delta
- Atherigona dentifera
- Atherigona dentifolia
- Atherigona dikei
- Atherigona disneyi
- Atherigona distincta
- Atherigona divergens
- Atherigona dybasi
- Atherigona enterona
- Atherigona epsilon
- Atherigona erectisetula
- Atherigona eriochloae
- Atherigona exigua
- Atherigona facilis
- Atherigona falcata
- Atherigona falkei
- Atherigona farooqii
- Atherigona fenestralis
- Atherigona fililoba
- Atherigona flava
- Atherigona flavicoxa
- Atherigona flavifinis
- Atherigona flaviheteropalpata
- Atherigona flexinervis
- Atherigona fortunata
- Atherigona freyi
- Atherigona fumivenosa
- Atherigona furculisterna
- Atherigona fusci
- Atherigona fuscicephala
- Atherigona fuscifemur
- Atherigona fuscisquama
- Atherigona gabonensis
- Atherigona gamma
- Atherigona gigantipunctata
- Atherigona gilvifolia
- Atherigona gracilipalpis
- Atherigona grisea
- Atherigona griseiventris
- Atherigona haplopyga
- Atherigona hargreavesi
- Atherigona hendersoni
- Atherigona hennigi
- Atherigona heteropalpata
- Atherigona huanshanensis
- Atherigona humeralis
- Atherigona hyalinipennis
- Atherigona idiasta
- Atherigona immaculata
- Atherigona insignis
- Atherigona integrifemur
- Atherigona iota
- Atherigona jacobsoni
- Atherigona johannis
- Atherigona jordaensi
- Atherigona kappa
- Atherigona kenierobaensis
- Atherigona kenyaensis
- Atherigona kirkspriggsi
- Atherigona kivuensis
- Atherigona kurahashii
- Atherigona laeta
- Atherigona laevigata
- Atherigona lamda
- Atherigona lamellifera
- Atherigona lamina
- Atherigona laocaiensis
- Atherigona latibasilaris
- Atherigona latiloba
- Atherigona leigongshana
- Atherigona libertensis
- Atherigona libra
- Atherigona lindneri
- Atherigona lineata
- Atherigona lombokensis
- Atherigona londti
- Atherigona longifolia
- Atherigona longipalpis
- Atherigona maculigera
- Atherigona maculipennis
- Atherigona madagascarensis
- Atherigona maliensis
- Atherigona mambillaensis
- Atherigona maraisi
- Atherigona marginifolia
- Atherigona matema
- Atherigona matilei
- Atherigona medleri
- Atherigona melameniscura
- Atherigona micropunctata
- Atherigona miliaceae
- Atherigona minor
- Atherigona mirabilis
- Atherigona mitrata
- Atherigona montana
- Atherigona mulleri
- Atherigona naqvii
- Atherigona ndumoensis
- Atherigona neoatripalpis
- Atherigona neorientalis
- Atherigona nesshurstensis
- Atherigona nigeriensis
- Atherigona nigrapicalis
- Atherigona nigriapicis
- Atherigona nigridorsalis
- Atherigona nigripes
- Atherigona nigrithorax
- Atherigona nigritibiella
- Atherigona nitella
- Atherigona nitida
- Atherigona nitidifrons
- Atherigona oblonga
- Atherigona obudua
- Atherigona occidentalis
- Atherigona ochracea
- Atherigona ochripes
- Atherigona omega
- Atherigona orbicularis
- Atherigona orbitalis
- Atherigona orientalis
- Atherigona oryzae
- Atherigona osculata
- Atherigona ovatipennis
- Atherigona pallicornis
- Atherigona pallidipalpis
- Atherigona pallidipes
- Atherigona pallidipleura
- Atherigona palpalis
- Atherigona parviclivis
- Atherigona parvihumilata
- Atherigona parvipuncta
- Atherigona pedunculata
- Atherigona pendleburyi
- Atherigona perfida
- Atherigona perpulchra
- Atherigona pharalis
- Atherigona phi
- Atherigona philema
- Atherigona pica
- Atherigona piceiventris
- Atherigona pilosa
- Atherigona piscatoris
- Atherigona poecilopoda
- Atherigona ponti
- Atherigona pottsi
- Atherigona prosternalis
- Atherigona pulla
- Atherigona punctata
- Atherigona punctipennis
- Atherigona pusaensis
- Atherigona qiana
- Atherigona qingchuanica
- Atherigona quadriseta
- Atherigona ramu
- Atherigona reddyi
- Atherigona reversura
- Atherigona rho
- Atherigona rimapicis
- Atherigona robertsi
- Atherigona rubricornis
- Atherigona ruficornis
- Atherigona rushanensis
- Atherigona samaruensis
- Atherigona santimensis
- Atherigona savia
- Atherigona scopula
- Atherigona secrecauda
- Atherigona semilunari
- Atherigona seticauda
- Atherigona setifemur
- Atherigona setitarsus
- Atherigona setiterga
- Atherigona sigma
- Atherigona simplex
- Atherigona soccata
- Atherigona splendens
- Atherigona steeleae
- Atherigona strigula
- Atherigona stuckenbergi
- Atherigona subnigripes
- Atherigona tarsalis
- Atherigona tau
- Atherigona tedderi
- Atherigona tenuipes
- Atherigona testaceae
- Atherigona tetrastigma
- Atherigona theodori
- Atherigona theta
- Atherigona tibiseta
- Atherigona tigris
- Atherigona tobi
- Atherigona tomentigera
- Atherigona transversa
- Atherigona trapezia
- Atherigona triaena
- Atherigona triangularis
- Atherigona tricolorifolia
- Atherigona tridens
- Atherigona tridentata
- Atherigona triglomerata
- Atherigona tritici
- Atherigona trukensis
- Atherigona truncata
- Atherigona tsumeb
- Atherigona tuberculata
- Atherigona tumidistipes
- Atherigona umbonata
- Atherigona unguicauda
- Atherigona unicolor
- Atherigona univittata
- Atherigona ustipennis
- Atherigona valida
- Atherigona varia
- Atherigona variata
- Atherigona vernoni
- Atherigona vibrissana
- Atherigona villiersi
- Atherigona vita
- Atherigona vittata
- Atherigona vittipennis
- Atherigona xuei
- Atherigona yorki
- Atherigona zariaensis
- Atherigona zeta
- Atherigona zongoi
- Atherigona zulu

== See also ==
- List of dipterans of Sri Lanka
