= Atherigona yorki =

Scientific classification
- Kingdom: Animalia
- Phylum: Arthropoda
- Class: Insecta
- Order: Diptera
- Family: Muscidae
- Genus: Atherigona
- Species: A. yorki

Binomial name
- Atherigona yorki Deeming, 1971

Species of fly

Atherigona yorki is a species of fly in the family Muscidae. It is a pest of millets.
