= Brukina =

Ghanaian milk and millet drink

Brukina, also known as Burkina, is a Senegalese and Ivorian drink made of ground millet and pasteurized milk. Brukina is popular in the northern region of Ghana. It is also known as 'Deger'.

== Overview ==
Brukina is considered to be a complete meal due to its energy density and high nutrient content. It consists mainly of millet, which is one of the world's oldest grains, and milk.
