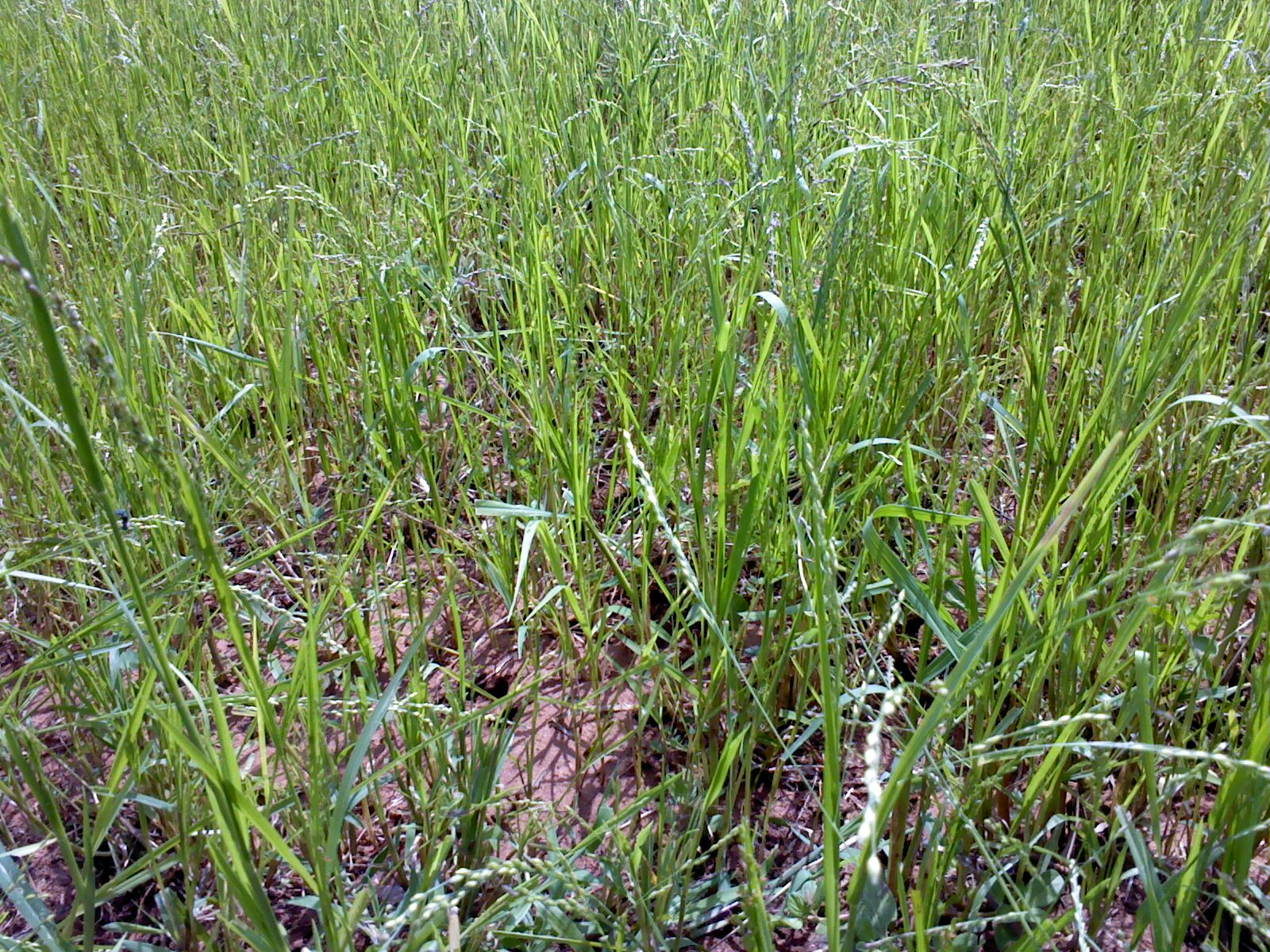
- Crop
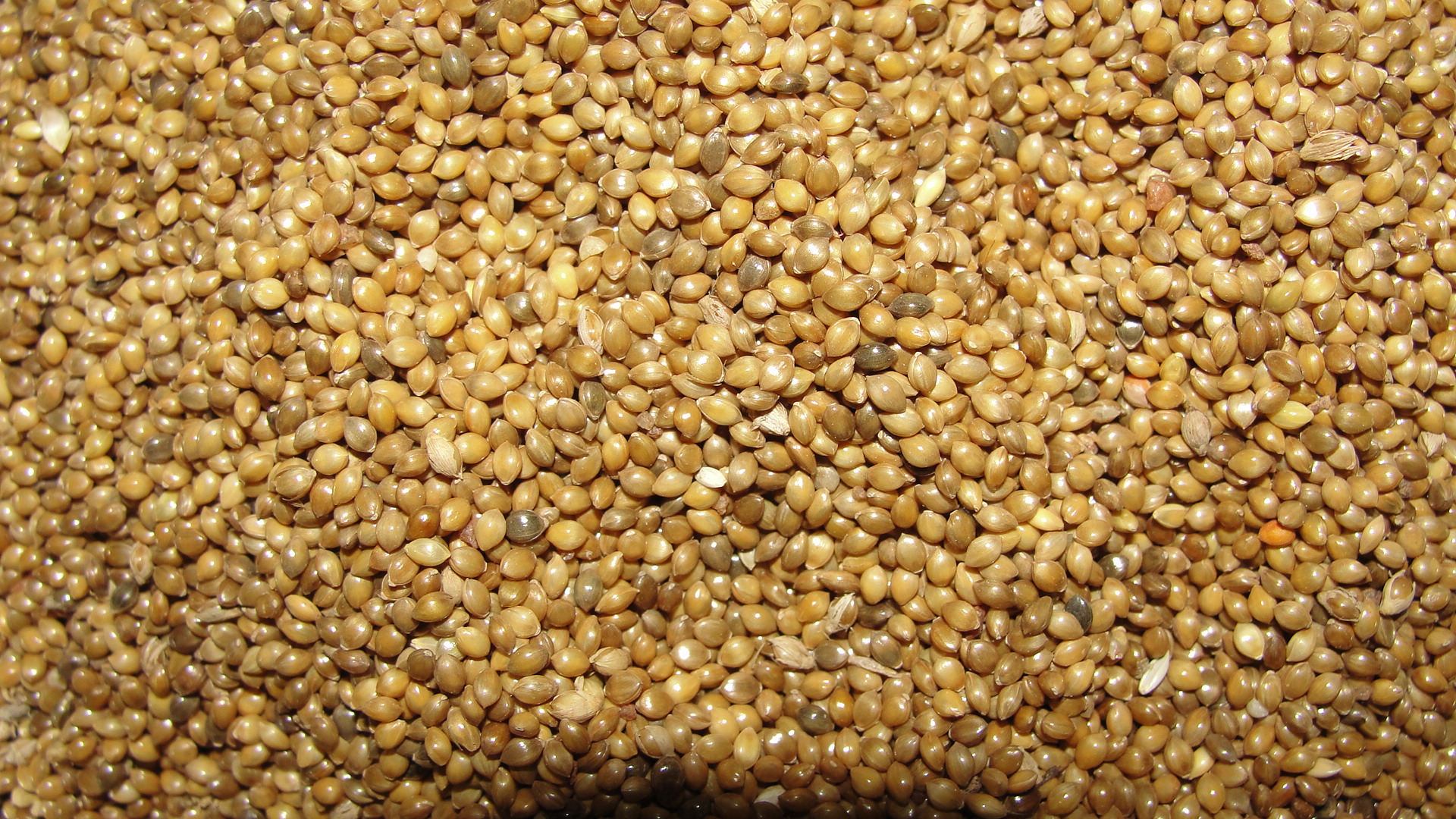
- Grain

Conservation status
- Least Concern (IUCN 3.1)

Scientific classification
- Kingdom: Plantae
- Clade: Tracheophytes
- Clade: Angiosperms
- Clade: Monocots
- Clade: Commelinids
- Order: Poales
- Family: Poaceae
- Subfamily: Panicoideae
- Genus: Panicum
- Species: P. sumatrense

Binomial name
- Panicum sumatrense Roth ex Roem. & Schult.

Synonyms
- Panicum miliare auct. non Lam.

= Panicum sumatrense =

Species of grass

Panicum sumatrense, known as little millet, is a species of millet in the family Poaceae.

== Description ==
This species of cereal is similar in habit to the proso millet except that it is smaller. It is an annual herbaceous plant, which grows straight or with folded blades to a height of 30 centimetres (12 in) to 1 metre (39 in). The leaves are linear, with the sometimes hairy laminae and membranous hairy ligules. The panicles are from 4 to 15 cm (1.6 to 5.9 in) in length with 2 to 3.5 mm (0.079 to 0.138 in) long awn. The grain is round and smooth, 1.8 to 1.9 mm (0.071 to 0.075 in) long.

== Subspecies ==
There have been two subspecies described:

- Panicum sumatrense Roth ex Roem. & Schult. subsp. psilopodium (Trin.) Wet.
- Panicum sumatrense Roth ex Roem. & Schult. subsp. sumatrense

== Distribution and habitat ==
In the temperate zones of Asia: the Caucasus, China, East Asia and also in the tropics of the continent: India, Indochina and Malaysia.

It can withstand both drought and waterlogging. It can be cultivated up to 2,000 metres (6,600 ft) above sea level.

At the Indus Valley Civilisation sites of Harappa and Farmana, the millet assemblage was dominated by little millet. Over 10,000 grains of little millet were recovered at Harappa. At Harappa, little millet cultivation peaked at around 2600 BCE, accounting for around 5% of the total cereal assemblage.

== Cultivation ==
The largest cultivation is in central India. Usually, it is planted using a seed drill. It can also if necessary be planted spoiled. The green plant can also be used in part as cattle feed. The straw can be mixed with clay or cement be used in construction.

The harvest yield is from 230 to 900 kg/ha.

=== Pests ===
Pests include the shoot fly Atherigona pulla, which also affects proso millet.

Other insect pests include:

- shoot fly, Atherigona miliaceae
- armyworms, Mythimna separata and Spodoptera frugiperda

Leaf feeders

- caterpillars: Aloa lactinea, Amsacta albistriga, Euproctis virguncula, and Paramsacta moorei
- flea beetles: Chaetocnema basalis, Chaetocnema indica, and Chaetocnema denticulata
- larvae of the leaf folder Cnaphalocrocis medinalis
- grasshoppers: Chrotogonus hemipterus, Acrida exaltata, Aiolopus simulatrix, and Aiolopus tamulus

Earhead feeders

- bugs Nezara viridula and Dolycoris indicus

Panicle pests

- spotted stalk borer Chilo partellus

Others

- Nephotettix virescens, Nephotettix nigropictus, and Nisia atrovenosa
- sugarcane leafhopper, Pyrilla perpusilla
- midge, Orseolia sp.

Little millet
Nutritional value per 100 g (3.5 oz)
- Energy: 341 kcal (1,430 kJ)
- Carbohydrates: 67.0 g
- Dietary fiber: 7.6 g
- Fat: 4.7 g
- Protein: 7.7 g
Vitamins and minerals
| Minerals | Quantity %DV^{†} |
| Calcium | 1% 17.0 mg |
| Iron | 52% 9.3 mg |
| Phosphorus | 18% 220.0 mg |
- ^{†}Percentages estimated using US recommendations for adults.

== Uses ==
Little millet is cooked like rice. Sometimes the millet is also milled and baked. The protein content of the grain is 7.7%.

== Common names ==
- Hindi: Kutki, Shavan
- Bengali: Sama
- Tamil: Saamai
- Gujarati: Gajro, Kuri
- Telugu: సామలు, romanized: Samalu
- Marathi: Sava, Halvi, Vari
- Odia: Suan
- Kannada: ಸಾಮೆ, romanized: Saame
- Malayalam: ചാമ, romanized: Chama
