= Smynthurodes betae =

Scientific classification
- Domain: Eukaryota
- Kingdom: Animalia
- Phylum: Arthropoda
- Class: Insecta
- Order: Hemiptera
- Suborder: Sternorrhyncha
- Family: Aphididae
- Genus: Smynthurodes
- Species: S. betae

Binomial name
- Smynthurodes betae Westwood, 1849

Species of aphid

Smynthurodes betae is a species of aphid. It is a pest of millets.
