= Altica caerulea =

Scientific classification
- Kingdom: Animalia
- Phylum: Arthropoda
- Clade: Pancrustacea
- Class: Insecta
- Order: Coleoptera
- Suborder: Polyphaga
- Infraorder: Cucujiformia
- Family: Chrysomelidae
- Genus: Altica
- Species: A. caerulea

Binomial name
- Altica caerulea (Olivier, 1791)

Species of beetle

Altica caerulea is a species of flea beetle. It is a pest of millets such as sorghum in India.
