= Altica cyanea =

Scientific classification
- Kingdom: Animalia
- Phylum: Arthropoda
- Class: Insecta
- Order: Coleoptera
- Suborder: Polyphaga
- Infraorder: Cucujiformia
- Family: Chrysomelidae
- Genus: Altica
- Species: A. cyanea

Binomial name
- Altica cyanea (Weber, 1801)

Species of beetle

Altica cyanea is a species of flea beetle. It is a pest of millets such as sorghum in India. It is being investigated as a biological pest control of Ludwigia adscendens, a common weed in rice fields.
