= Protaphis middletonii =

Scientific classification
- Kingdom: Animalia
- Phylum: Arthropoda
- Class: Insecta
- Order: Hemiptera
- Suborder: Sternorrhyncha
- Family: Aphididae
- Genus: Protaphis
- Species: P. middletonii

Binomial name
- Protaphis middletonii (Thomas, 1879)

Synonyms
- Aphis middletonii

Species of aphid

Protaphis middletonii is a species of aphid. It is a pest of millets.
