= Florithrips traegardhi =

Scientific classification
- Kingdom: Animalia
- Phylum: Arthropoda
- Class: Insecta
- Order: Thysanoptera
- Family: Thripidae
- Genus: Florithrips
- Species: F. traegardhi

Binomial name
- Florithrips traegardhi (Trybom, 1911)

Synonyms
- Physapus traegardhi

Species of thrips

Florithrips traegardhi is a species of thrips. It is a pest of millets in India.
