= Atherigona falcata =

Scientific classification
- Kingdom: Animalia
- Phylum: Arthropoda
- Class: Insecta
- Order: Diptera
- Family: Muscidae
- Genus: Atherigona
- Species: A. falcata

Binomial name
- Atherigona falcata (Thomson, 1869)

Species of fly

Atherigona falcata, the barnyard millet shoot fly, is a species of fly in the family Muscidae. It is found throughout Asia. It is known to affect Echinochloa colona, Echinochloa frumentacea, Echinochloa stagnina, and Panicum sumatrense.
