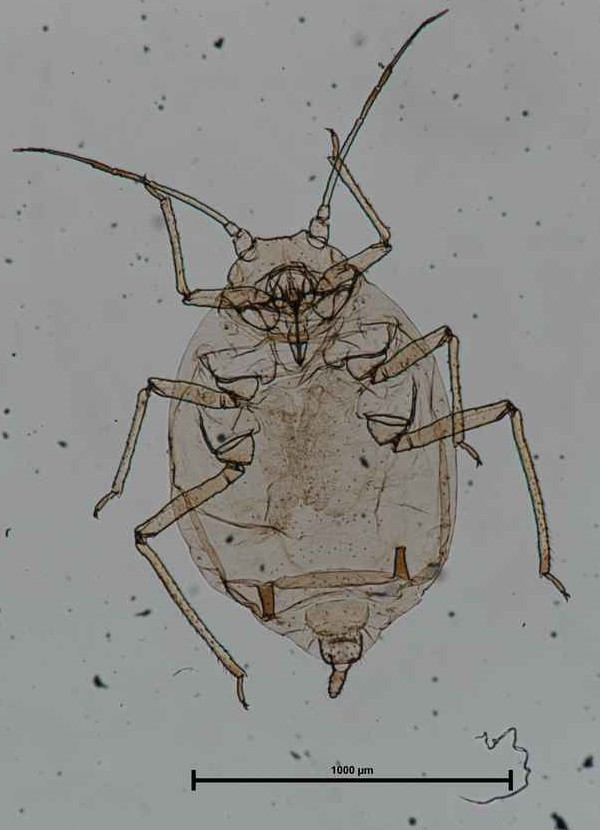
- Melanaphis sorghi apterous female habitus

Scientific classification
- Kingdom: Animalia
- Phylum: Arthropoda
- Class: Insecta
- Order: Hemiptera
- Suborder: Sternorrhyncha
- Family: Aphididae
- Genus: Melanaphis
- Species: M. sorghi

Binomial name
- Melanaphis sorghi (Theobald, 1904)

Synonyms
- Aphis sorghi

= Melanaphis sorghi =

Species of aphid

Melanaphis sorghi is a species of aphid. It is a pest of millets.
