= Atherigona biseta =

Scientific classification
- Kingdom: Animalia
- Phylum: Arthropoda
- Class: Insecta
- Order: Diptera
- Family: Muscidae
- Genus: Atherigona
- Species: A. biseta

Binomial name
- Atherigona biseta Karl, 1939

Species of fly

Atherigona biseta is a species of fly in the family Muscidae. It is found in China. Its host range is restricted to the Setaria species Setaria viridis, Setaria faberi, and Setaria pumila.
