= Nephotettix nigropictus =

Scientific classification
- Kingdom: Animalia
- Phylum: Arthropoda
- Clade: Pancrustacea
- Class: Insecta
- Order: Hemiptera
- Suborder: Auchenorrhyncha
- Family: Cicadellidae
- Genus: Nephotettix
- Species: N. nigropictus

Binomial name
- Nephotettix nigropictus (Stål, 1870)

Species of true bug

Nephotettix nigropictus is a species of true bug in the family Cicadellidae. It is a pest of millets.
