= Atherigona miliaceae =

Scientific classification
- Kingdom: Animalia
- Phylum: Arthropoda
- Class: Insecta
- Order: Diptera
- Family: Muscidae
- Genus: Atherigona
- Species: A. miliaceae

Binomial name
- Atherigona miliaceae Malloch, 1925

Species of fly

Atherigona miliaceae, the finger millet shoot fly, is a species of fly in the family Muscidae. The larvae feed on the central growing shoots of crops such as finger millet, little millet, and proso millet. It is found in East Asia and South Asia.
