= Atherigona soccata =

Scientific classification
- Kingdom: Animalia
- Phylum: Arthropoda
- Class: Insecta
- Order: Diptera
- Family: Muscidae
- Genus: Atherigona
- Species: A. soccata

Binomial name
- Atherigona soccata Rondani, 1871

Species of fly

Atherigona soccata, the sorghum shoot fly, is a species of fly in the family Muscidae whose larvae feed on the central growing shoots of millet crops like sorghum and finger millet, as well as maize, where they can cause serious loss of yield across Africa and Asia.

Sorghum is grown mainly in Africa and Asia with some areas also in southern Europe. The adult fly lays eggs on the underside of the leaf of the host plant. A female may lay about 75 eggs. The eggs hatch in a week and the larva moves to the central whorl and feeds on the growing tip, resulting in the plant failing to grow. The larvae pupate after about 17 days and adults may emerge after another 11 days under warm conditions. Many efforts have been made to breed crop varieties that are resistant to shoot fly attack. Altering the season of planting can also be effective under some conditions as the flies only attack young seedlings. The adults can be monitored using bait consisting of fish-meal (with fish oil), brewer's yeast and ammonium sulphide. Attempts have also been made to augment natural predators and parasites to manage or reduce damage to crops.
