= Atherigona atripalpis =

Scientific classification
- Kingdom: Animalia
- Phylum: Arthropoda
- Class: Insecta
- Order: Diptera
- Family: Muscidae
- Genus: Atherigona
- Species: A. atripalpis

Binomial name
- Atherigona atripalpis Malloch, 1925

Species of fly

Atherigona atripalpis, the foxtail millet shoot fly, is a species of fly in the family Muscidae. It is found in East Asia and South Asia. Its host range includes the Setaria species Setaria italica, Setaria glauca, and Setaria plicata.
