= Chaetocnema basalis =

Scientific classification
- Kingdom: Animalia
- Phylum: Arthropoda
- Class: Insecta
- Order: Coleoptera
- Suborder: Polyphaga
- Infraorder: Cucujiformia
- Family: Chrysomelidae
- Subfamily: Galerucinae
- Tribe: Alticini
- Genus: Chaetocnema
- Species: C. basalis

Binomial name
- Chaetocnema basalis Baly, 1877

Synonyms
- Chaetocnema geniculata Jacoby, 1896

Species of beetle

Chaetocnema basalis is a species of leaf beetle, family Chrysomelidae, in the subfamily Galerucinae. It is considered an agricultural pest, affecting both millets and sorghum in the Palearctic realm and continent of Asia. It is considered a synonym of Chaetocnema nigrica by some sources.
