= Microtermes obesi =

Scientific classification
- Domain: Eukaryota
- Kingdom: Animalia
- Phylum: Arthropoda
- Class: Insecta
- Order: Blattodea
- Infraorder: Isoptera
- Family: Termitidae
- Genus: Microtermes
- Species: M. obesi

Binomial name
- Microtermes obesi Holmgren, 1912

Synonyms
- Microtermes obesi Holmgren, 1912; Microtermes anandi Holmgren, 1913; Microtermes anandi curvignathus Holmgren, 1913

Species of termite

Microtermes obesi, the wheat termite, is a small species of termite of the genus Microtermes. It is native to India, Sri Lanka, Pakistan and Vietnam. It is a major pest of wheat and minor pest of sugarcane.

These termites are cream colored with dark head. Workers more active in the morning and evening. It is one of major pest of wheat. They damage wheat just after sowing and close to the maturity. Heavily infected plants may wilt and can pulled out easily. Temites can control by using natural predators such as Metarhizium anisopliae, and Beauveria bassiana.

Seed extract of W. somnifera and H. auriculata were highly toxic with LD 50 s (4.31 and 2.98%), respectively, in 6 days period. Reduction in area of tunneling and number of bacterial colonies was observed in the soil treated with seed and leaf extracts of three species. There was no tunneling in seed extracts of W. somnifera and C. tiglium at their 100% concentration. Area of tunneling was short in seed extracts of plants as compared with leaf extracts on numerical terms. The number of gut bacterial colonies was also reduced in termites inhabitant soil treated with seed extracts of W. somnifera and C. tiglium. It was suggested that extracts of three species were not only toxic to M. obesi but also acted arrestants of movements as well.

Sex pheromone of Microtermes obesi, which was extracted and isolated from the abdominal tips of adult female termites. The sex pheromone of this termite species indicated to be an unsaturated diterpinoid hydrocarbon, which on test exhibited that 95% males and 15% females of the same species responded to it.
