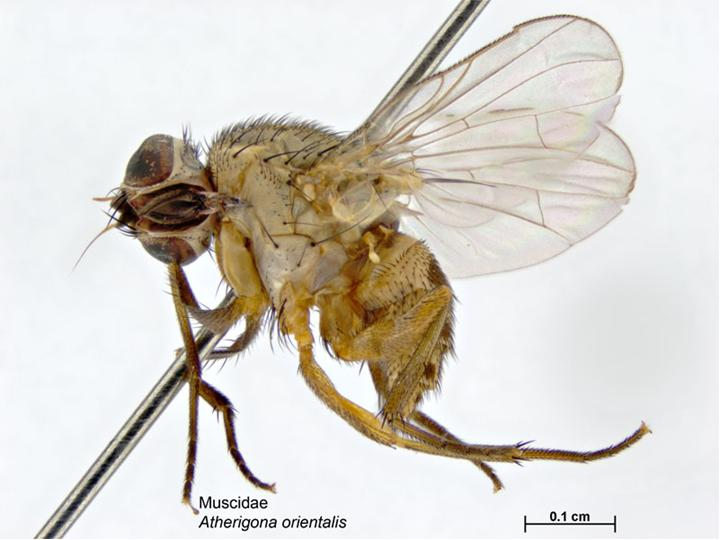

Scientific classification
- Kingdom: Animalia
- Phylum: Arthropoda
- Class: Insecta
- Order: Diptera
- Family: Muscidae
- Genus: Atherigona
- Species: A. orientalis

Binomial name
- Atherigona orientalis Schiner, 1868

= Atherigona orientalis =

Species of fly

Atherigona orientalis, the tomato fly or pepper fruit fly, is a species of fly in the family Muscidae. It is the only member of Atherigona known from the New World, but is common also in warmer parts of the Old World, especially the southern Palaearctic, throughout the Oriental and Afrotropical regions, Australia and into the Pacific, and almost every island as far east as Hawaii.

It is considered a pest of capsicum and tomato in the European and Mediterranean region, but may also be a pest to other crops.

== Biology ==
Adults are frequently collected from garbage, dung, carrion and decaying food, and is considered an important vectors of faecal pathogens on Guam. Larvae live in decaying fruit and vegetables, and adults live in houses and on windows, in rainforests, on flowers and dung.

Eggs are laid on or under the calyx of ripe or rotten fruit. Eggs hatch after one day, and the total life cycle is 18 to 30 days long, depending on temperature and humidity. Pupae are barrel shaped, yellow or orange, deepening to a reddish brown over time.

== Description ==
A body length of 3.5-4 mm in males, and up to 5 mm in females. Setae and setulae are completely black. Mainly yellow beneath the pruinosity, orange-yellow frontal vitta. Palpi are yellow or brown. Prementum brown to dark brown. Scutellum dark and yellowish-grey. The legs of A. orientalis are almost fully yellow, brown in some places. Wings clear and between 2.5-3 mm for males and 2.5-4 mm for females in length. Ground colour of abdomen is yellow.

This species can be quite variable, differing in colour from orange-yellow to dark brown.
