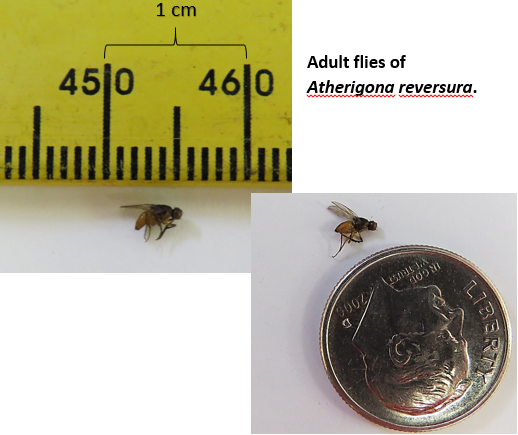
- Atherigona reversura

Scientific classification
- Kingdom: Animalia
- Phylum: Arthropoda
- Clade: Pancrustacea
- Class: Insecta
- Order: Diptera
- Family: Muscidae
- Genus: Atherigona
- Species: A. reversura

Binomial name
- Atherigona reversura Villeneuve, 1936

= Atherigona reversura =

Species of fly

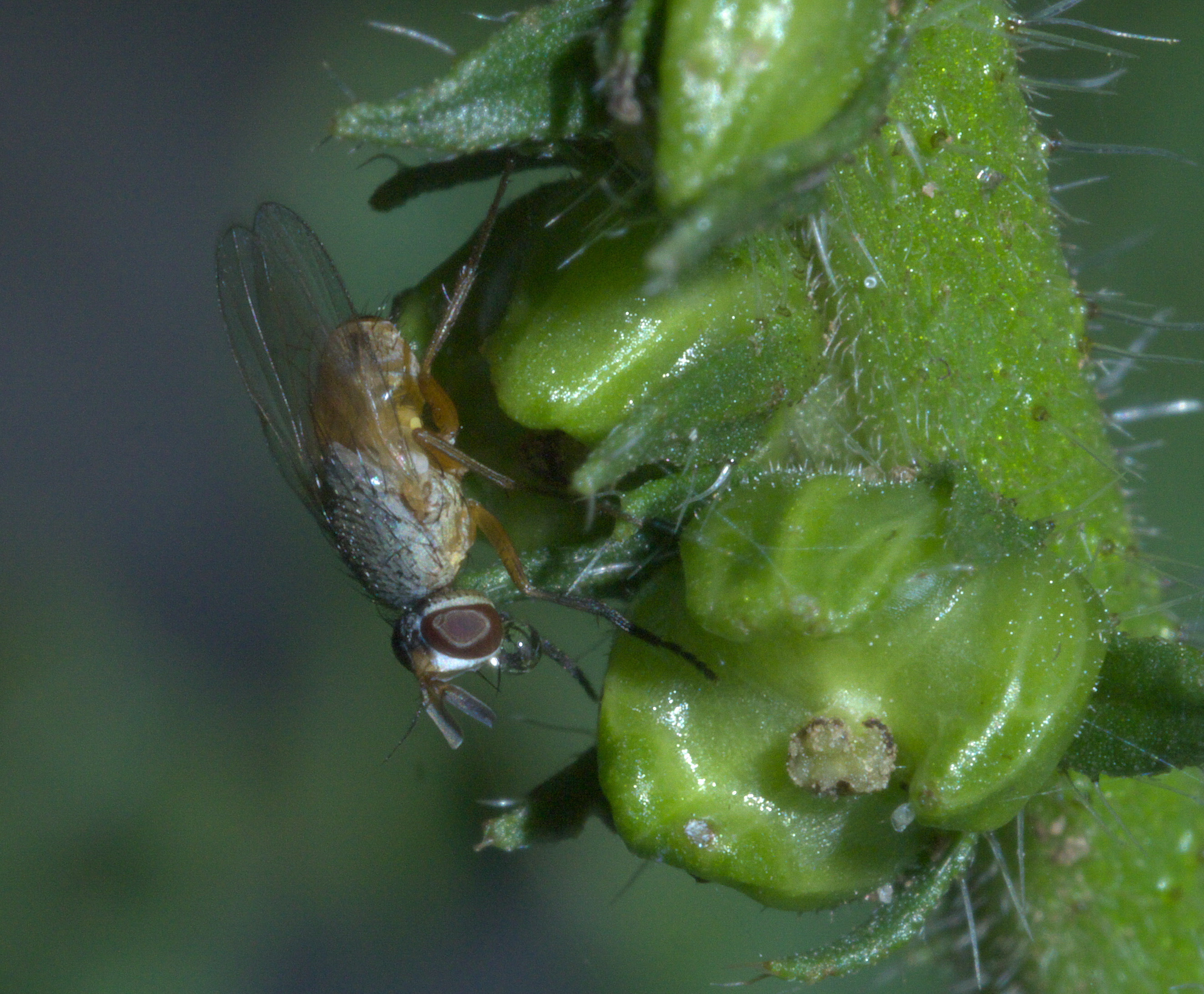
Atherigona reversura, bermudagrass stem maggot, body size: 3.1 mm

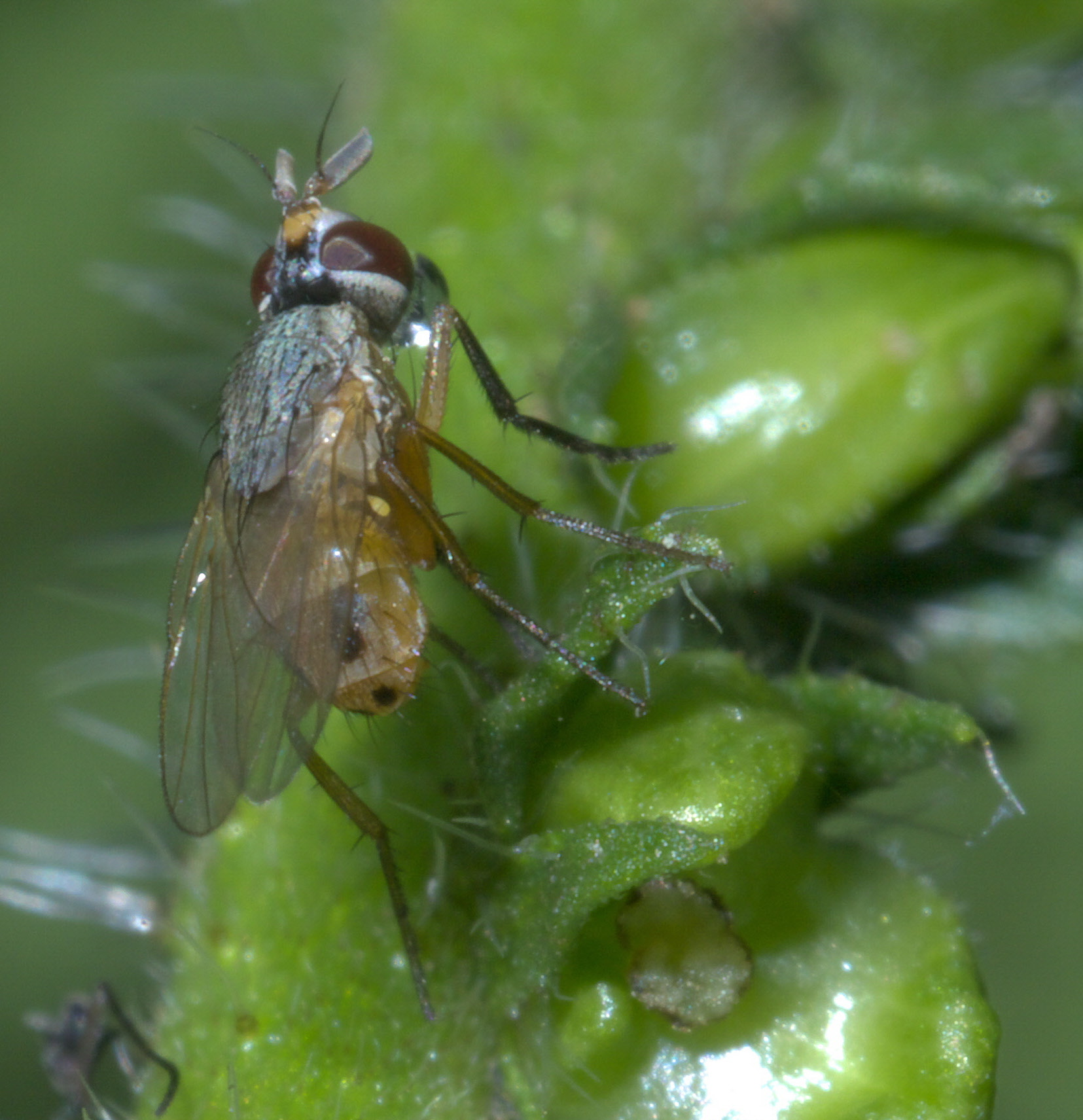
Atherigona reversura, bermudagrass stem maggot

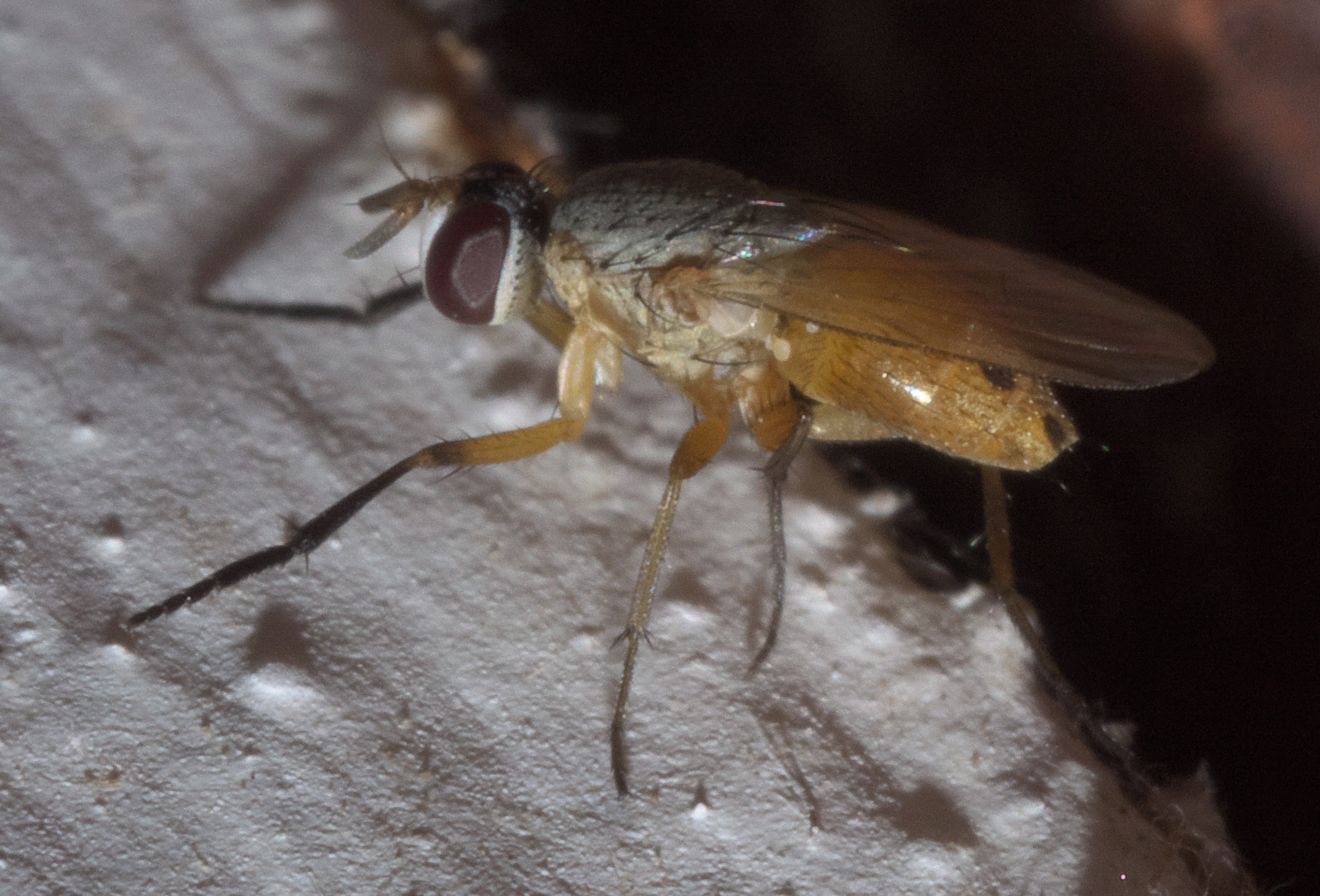
Atherigona reversura, bermudagrass stem maggot, body size 4 mm

Atherigona reversura, the bermudagrass stem maggot, is a shoot fly (genus Atherigona) in the family Muscidae. The genus comprises around 300 species, and some of them are very damaging pests in agriculture. The bermudagrass stem maggot takes its name from its host preference for bermudagrass (Cynodon dactylon) and stargrass (Cynodon nlemfuensis).

== Description ==
This small fly has an angular head, transparent wings, and the adult fly is colored between gray and yellow. Males have a rounded abdomen and are smaller than females. The abdomen in the females is larger and pointed. The larvae are cylindrical, white and have mouthhooks that are used to masticate the tender parts of the new shoots.

== Location ==
Atherigona reversura is native to Central and Southeast Asia.

This fly was accidentally introduced into Hawaii, and causes great damage in turfgrass. In 2009 it was reported in California and in 2010 was reported in Georgia and southern Mexico. Without clear knowledge of its introduction, the bermudagrass stem maggot has rapidly spread over the Southeastern of United States causing significant yield loss in grazing and hay production systems,

== Life cycle ==
Little is known about the life cycle of Atherigona reversura, nevertheless, it has been reported that the eggs are laid in the underside of the leaf in bermudagrass. After 2.5 days the larva emerge and move to the node where the stem emerges. The larva feed from the node causing the death of the leaf. After 1 to 3 days the feeding damage is evident, the larvae leave the stem, and move to the ground for pupation, where after 7 or 10 days the flies emerge. Adult flies can survive approximately 21 to 28 days producing many offspring during its adult life,. The populations of the bermudagrass stem maggot increase from south to north gradually, with populations picking up in mid-June in Central Florida and late July in North Georgia. In general all the bermudagrass cultivars have been susceptible to stem maggot damage, but cultivars with high number of shoots, small shoot diameter and narrow leaves show higher preference by the fly. Currently the recommendations to suppress infestations in the crops are to harvest the grass to help break the life cycle and to apply pyrethroid insecticides after grass regrowth, approximately 7 to 10 days after cutting, Current research focuses on improving understanding of the behavior, biology and ecology of this insect pest.
