= Atherigona hyalinipennis =

Scientific classification
- Kingdom: Animalia
- Phylum: Arthropoda
- Class: Insecta
- Order: Diptera
- Family: Muscidae
- Genus: Atherigona
- Species: A. hyalinipennis

Binomial name
- Atherigona hyalinipennis Emden, 1959

Species of fly

Atherigona hyalinipennis, the teff shoot fly, is a species of fly in the family Muscidae. The larvae feed on the seedlings of crops such as teff. It is found in East Africa.
