= Atherigona naqvii =

Scientific classification
- Domain: Eukaryota
- Kingdom: Animalia
- Phylum: Arthropoda
- Class: Insecta
- Order: Diptera
- Family: Muscidae
- Genus: Atherigona
- Species: A. naqvii

Binomial name
- Atherigona naqvii Steyskal, 1966

Species of fly

Atherigona naqvii, the wheat stem fly, is a species of fly in the family Muscidae. It is a pest of the wheat plant, Triticum aestivum, and has also been known to affect maize crops.
