= Brevennia rehi =

Scientific classification
- Domain: Eukaryota
- Kingdom: Animalia
- Phylum: Arthropoda
- Class: Insecta
- Order: Hemiptera
- Suborder: Sternorrhyncha
- Family: Pseudococcidae
- Genus: Brevennia
- Species: B. rehi

Binomial name
- Brevennia rehi (Lindinger)

Species of true bug

Brevennia rehi, the rice mealybug, is a species of true bug in the family Pseudococcidae. It is a pest of sorghum and kodo millet in India.
