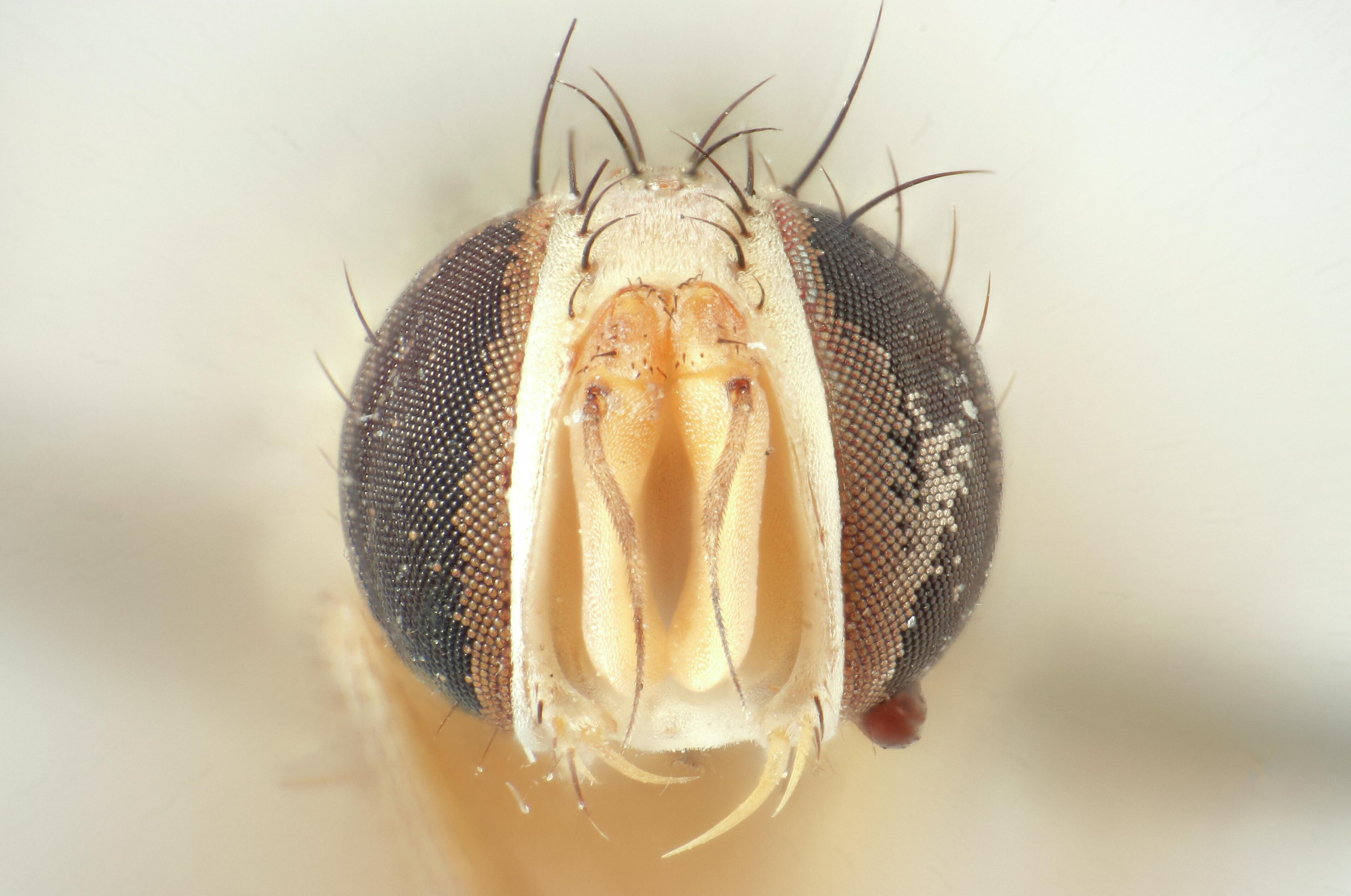
- Head of Atherigona pulla

Scientific classification
- Kingdom: Animalia
- Phylum: Arthropoda
- Clade: Pancrustacea
- Class: Insecta
- Order: Diptera
- Family: Muscidae
- Genus: Atherigona
- Species: A. pulla

Binomial name
- Atherigona pulla (Wiedemann, 1830)

= Atherigona pulla =

Species of fly

Atherigona pulla, the proso millet shoot fly, is a species of fly in the family Muscidae. The larvae feed on the central growing shoots of crops such as proso millet and little millet. It is found in South Asia.

It is known to affect Panicum miliaceum, Panicum sumatrense, Paspalum scrobiculatum, and Setaria italica crops.
