= Atherigona punctata =

Scientific classification
- Kingdom: Animalia
- Phylum: Arthropoda
- Class: Insecta
- Order: Diptera
- Family: Muscidae
- Genus: Atherigona
- Species: A. punctata

Binomial name
- Atherigona punctata Karl, 1940

Species of fly

Atherigona punctata, the Coimbatore wheat stem fly, is a species of fly in the family Muscidae. In South India, it is a pest of the wheat plant, Triticum aestivum.
