= Atherigona simplex =

Scientific classification
- Kingdom: Animalia
- Phylum: Arthropoda
- Class: Insecta
- Order: Diptera
- Family: Muscidae
- Genus: Atherigona
- Species: A. simplex

Binomial name
- Atherigona simplex (Thomas, 1869)

Species of fly

Atherigona simplex, the kodo millet shoot fly, is a species of fly in the family Muscidae. It is found in South Asia.
