= Atherigona oryzae =

Scientific classification
- Kingdom: Animalia
- Phylum: Arthropoda
- Class: Insecta
- Order: Diptera
- Family: Muscidae
- Genus: Atherigona
- Species: A. oryzae

Binomial name
- Atherigona oryzae Malloch, 1925

Species of fly

Atherigona oryzae, the rice shoot fly, is a species of fly in the family Muscidae. It is found in Asia and Australia. It is known to affect rice, kodo millet, wheat, and corn crops.
