= Dolycoris indicus =

Scientific classification
- Domain: Eukaryota
- Kingdom: Animalia
- Phylum: Arthropoda
- Class: Insecta
- Order: Hemiptera
- Suborder: Heteroptera
- Family: Pentatomidae
- Genus: Dolycoris
- Species: D. indicus

Binomial name
- Dolycoris indicus Stål, 1876

Species of true bug

Dolycoris indicus is a species of true bug in the family Pentatomidae. It is a pest of millets.
