= Millet =

Group of grasses (food grain)

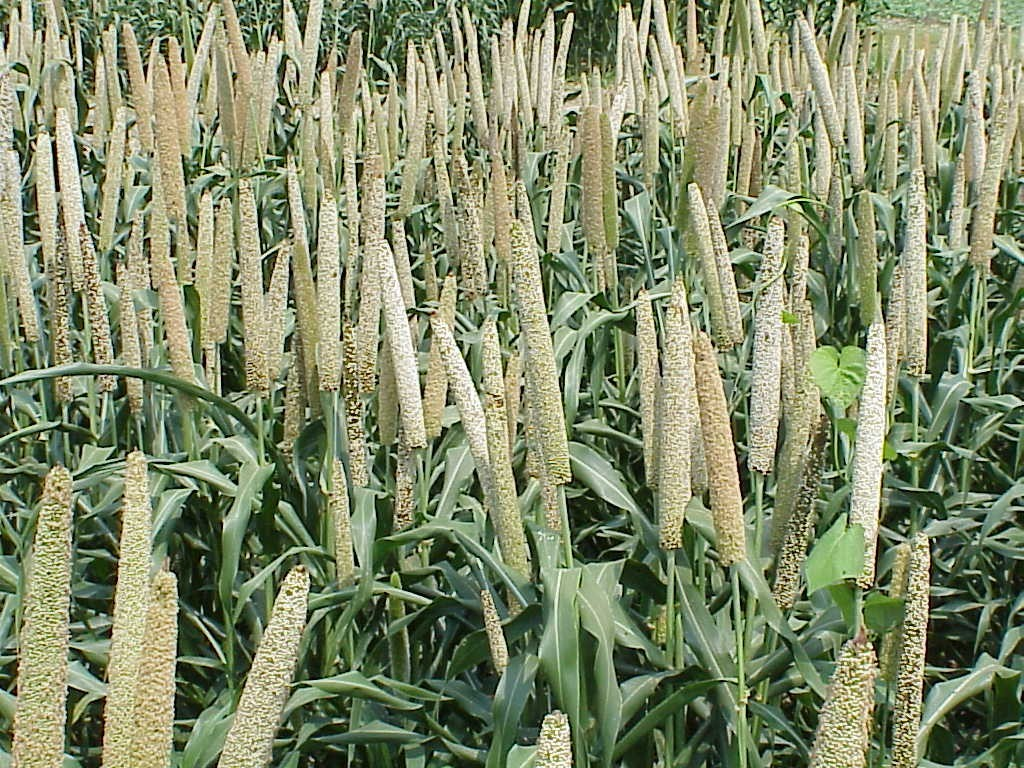
Pearl millet

Millets (/ˈmɪlɪts/) are a highly varied group of small-seeded grasses, widely grown around the world as a staple cereal crop. Similar to maize and oats amongst other major staple grains, millet and millet-based products are used both as fodder for livestock and as food for humans. Most millets belong to the tribe Paniceae.

Accounting for 97% of agricultural output amongst developing countries, millets are important crops in the semi-arid tropics of Asia and Africa, especially in India, Mali, Nigeria, and Niger. The crop is favoured for its productivity and short growing season under hot, dry conditions. The term "millets" sometimes is understood to include the widely cultivated sorghum; apart from that, pearl millet is the most commonly cultivated of the millets. Millets may have been consumed by humans for about 7,000 years and potentially had "a pivotal role in the rise of multi-crop agriculture and settled farming societies".

== Etymology ==
The word millet is derived via Old French millet, millot from Latin millium, 'millet', ultimately from Proto-Indo-European *mele-, 'to crush'.

== Description ==
=== Characteristics ===
Millets are small-grained, annual, warm-weather cereals belonging to the grass family. They are highly tolerant of drought and other extreme weather conditions and have a similar nutrient content to other major cereals.

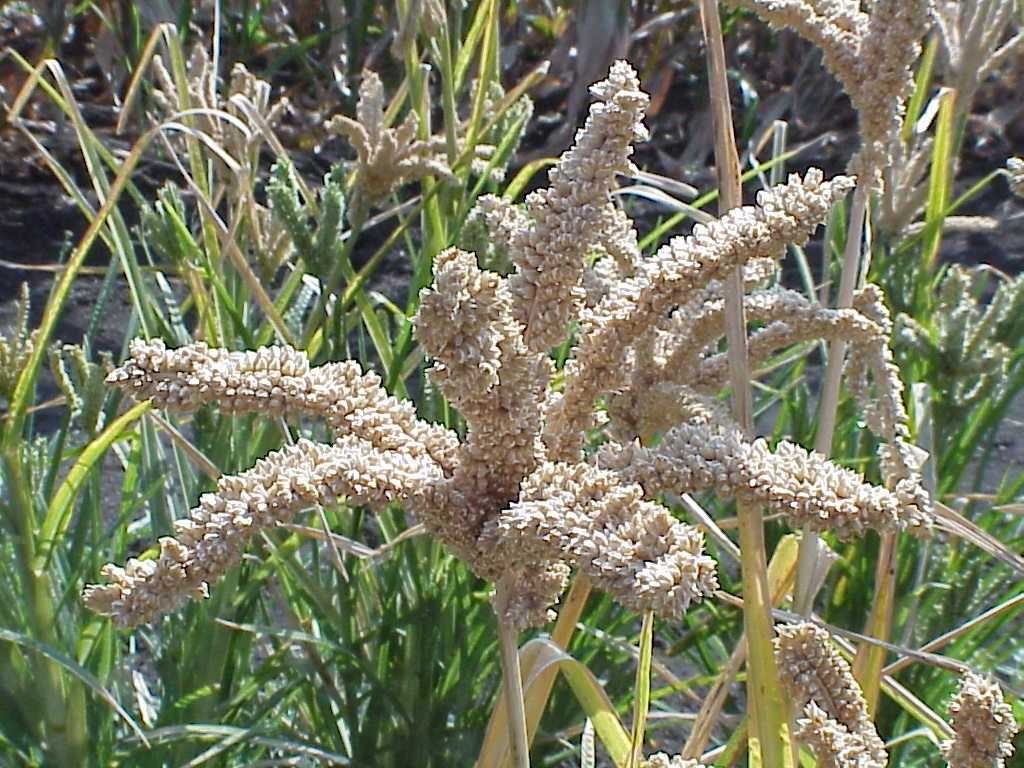
Finger millet in the field

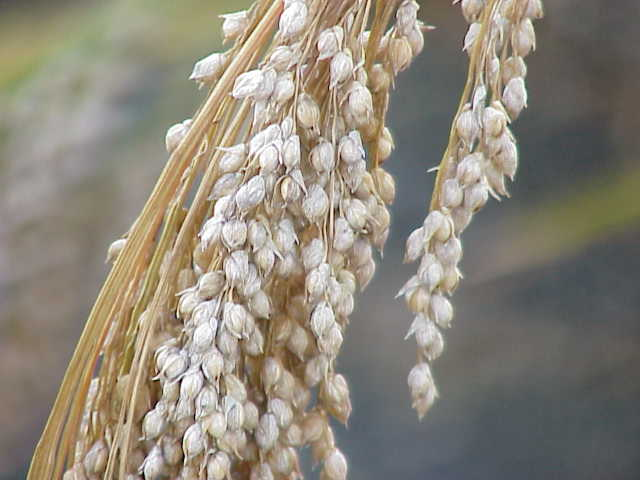
Ripe head of proso millet

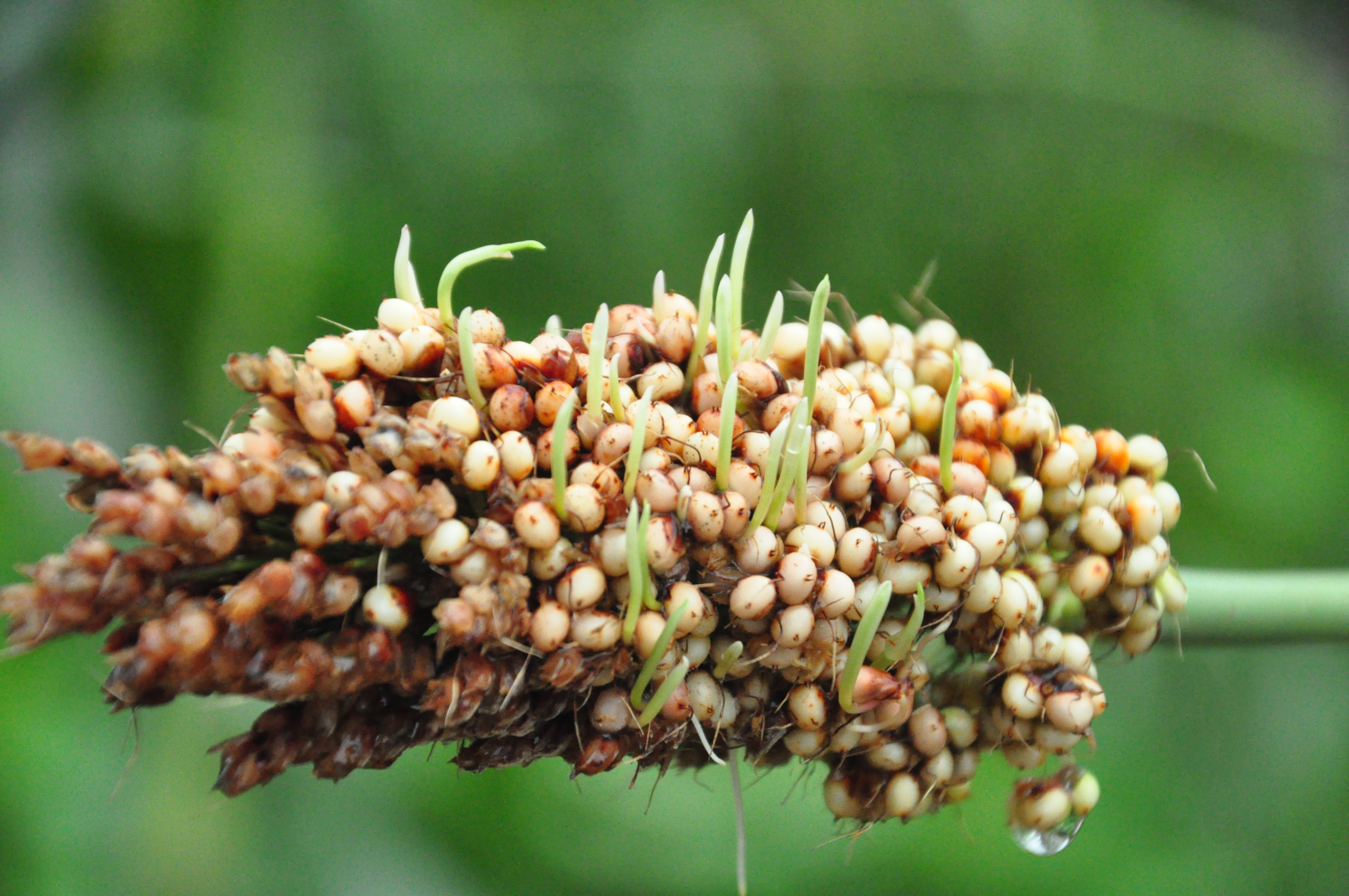
Sprouting millet plants

=== Taxonomic history ===
In 1753, Carl Linnaeus described foxtail millet as Panicum italicum. Finger millet was described as Eleusine coracana by Joseph Gaertner in 1788. In 1812, Palisot de Beauvois grouped several taxa into Setaria italica.

The genus Pennisetum was divided by Otto Stapf in 1934 into the section penicillaria, with 32 species including all the cultivated ones, and four other sections. In 1977, J. Brunken and colleagues classed the wild P. violaceum as part of the cultivated species P. glaucum (pearl millet).

== Evolution ==
=== Phylogeny ===
The millets are closely related to sorghum and maize within the PACMAD clade of grasses, and more distantly to the cereals of the BOP clade such as wheat and barley.

- (Part of Poaceae)
  - BOP clade
    - Bambusoideae (bamboos)
    - - Pooideae
        - Poeae
          Avena (oat), fescue, ryegrass
        - Triticeae
          - Hordeum (barley)
          - - Triticum (wheat)
            - Secale (rye)
      - Oryza (rice)
  - PACMAD clade
    - Aristidoideae
    - - Panicoideae
        - Andropogoneae (sorghum aka great millet, maize, sugarcane)
        - Paniceae (most other millets)
      - - - Chloridoideae
            - Cynodonteae (finger millet)
            - Eragrostideae (teff)
          - Danthonioideae
        - - Arundinoideae
          - Micrairoideae

Within the Panicoideae, sorghum (great millet) is in the tribe Andropogoneae, while pearl millet, proso, foxtail, fonio, little millet, sawa, Japanese barnyard millet and kodo are in the tribe Paniceae. Within the Chloridoideae, finger millet is in the tribe Cynodonteae, while teff is in the tribe Eragrostideae.

=== Taxonomy ===
The different species of millets are not all closely related. All are members of the family Poaceae (the grasses), but they belong to different tribes and subfamilies. Commonly cultivated millets are:

Eragrostideae tribe in the subfamily Chloridoideae:

- Eleusine coracana: Finger millet
- Eragrostis tef: Teff; often not considered to be a millet

Paniceae tribe in the subfamily Panicoideae:

- Genus Panicum:
  - Panicum miliaceum: Proso millet (common millet, broomcorn millet, hog millet, or white millet, also known as baragu in Kannada, panivaragu in Tamil)
  - Panicum sumatrense: Little millet
  - Panicum hirticaule: Sonoran millet, cultivated in the American Southwest
- Cenchrus americanus: Pearl millet

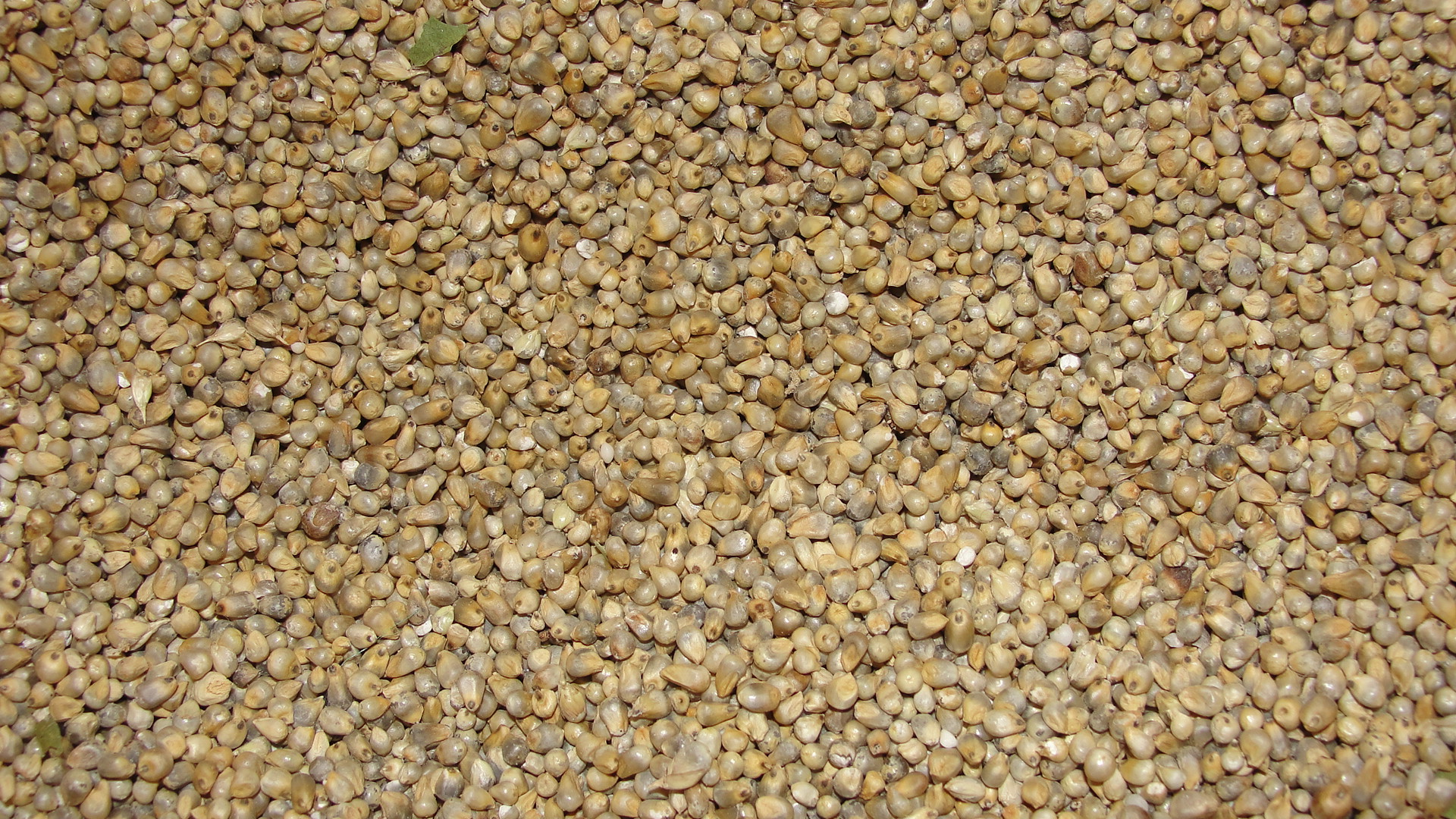
Pearl millet (Cenchrus americanus)

- Setaria italica: Foxtail millet, Italian millet, panic
- Genus Digitaria: of minor importance as crops
  - Digitaria exilis: known as white fonio, fonio millet, and hungry rice or acha rice
  - Digitaria iburua: Black fonio
  - Digitaria compacta: Raishan, cultivated in the Khasi Hills of northeast India
  - Digitaria sanguinalis: Polish millet
- Genus Echinochloa: collectively, the members of this genus are called barnyard grasses or barnyard millets
  - Echinochloa esculenta: Japanese barnyard millet
  - Echinochloa frumentacea: Indian barnyard millet
  - Echinochloa stagnina: Burgu millet
  - Echinochloa crus-galli: Common barnyard grass (or cockspur grass)
- Paspalum scrobiculatum: Kodo millet

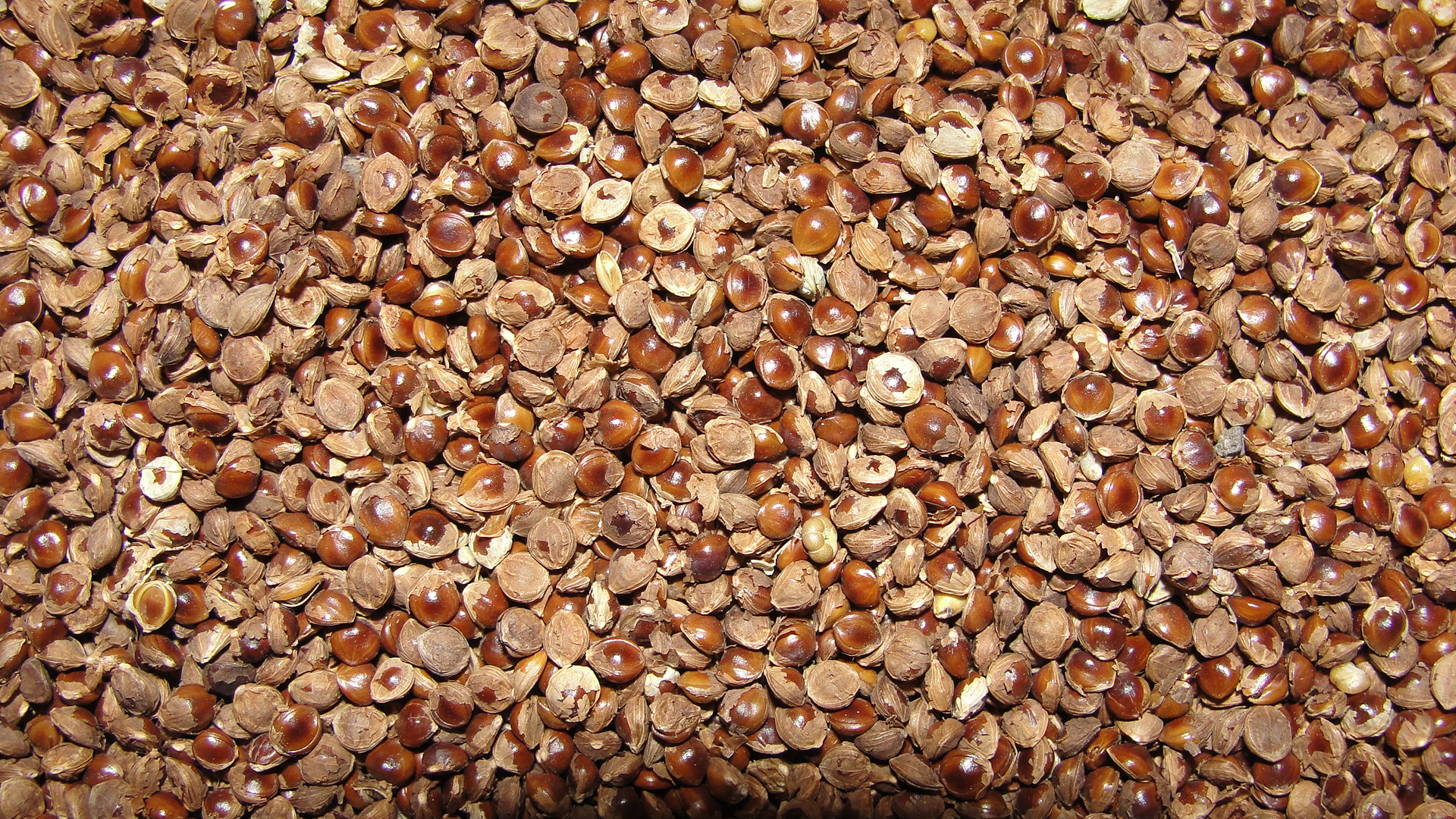
Kodo millet (Paspalum scrobiculatum)

- Genus Urochloa (formerly Brachiaria)
  - Urochloa deflexa: Guinea millet
  - Urochloa ramosa: Browntop millet, southern India
- Spodiopogon formosanus: Taiwan oil millet, endemic to Taiwan

Andropogoneae tribe, also in the subfamily Panicoideae:

- Sorghum bicolor: Sorghum; usually considered a separate cereal, but sometimes known as great millet
- Coix lacryma-jobi: Job's tears, also known as adlay millet

== Domestication and spread ==
The cultivation of common millet as the earliest dry crop in East Asia has been attributed to its resistance to drought, and this has been suggested to have aided its spread. Asian varieties of millet made their way from China to the Black Sea region of Europe by 5000 BC.

Millet was growing wild in Greece as early as 3000 BC, and bulk storage containers for millet have been found from the Late Bronze Age in Macedonia and northern Greece. Hesiod states that "the beards grow round the millet, which men sow in summer." Millet is listed along with wheat in the third century BC by Theophrastus in his Enquiry into Plants.

=== East Asia ===
Proso millet (Panicum miliaceum) and foxtail millet (Setaria italica) were important crops beginning in the Early Neolithic of China. Some of the earliest evidence of millet cultivation in China was found at Cishan, where proso millet husk phytoliths and biomolecular components have been identified around 10,300–8,700 years ago in storage pits along with remains of pit-houses, pottery, and stone tools related to millet cultivation. Evidence at Cishan for foxtail millet dates back to around 8,700 years ago. Noodles made from these two varieties of millet were found in 2005 under a 4,000-year-old earthenware bowl containing well-preserved noodles at the Lajia archaeological site in north China; this was said to be the oldest evidence of millet noodles in China, but in 2010 other Chinese researchers cast doubts on the 2005 findings' methodology, questioning if the noodles were even made of millet. During the Late Neolithic and Bronze Age, a majority of the cereals consumed during the Zhengluo region (modern Henan) of China were foxtail millet and proso millet. Chinese myths attribute the domestication of millet to Shennong, a legendary emperor of China, and Hou Ji, whose name means Lord Millet.

Palaeoethnobotanists have found evidence of the cultivation of millet in the Korean Peninsula dating to the Middle Jeulmun pottery period (around 3500–2000 BC). Millet continued to be an important element in the intensive, multicropping agriculture of the Mumun pottery period (about 1500–300 BC) in Korea. Millets and their wild ancestors, such as barnyard grass and panic grass, were also cultivated in Japan during the Jōmon period sometime after 4000 BC.

=== Indian subcontinent ===
Little millet (Panicum sumatrense) is believed to have been domesticated around 3000 BC in the Indian subcontinent and Kodo millet (Paspalum scrobiculatum) around 3700 BC, also in the Indian subcontinent. Pearl millet had arrived in the Indian subcontinent by 2000 BC to 1700 BC. Browntop millet (Urochloa ramosa) was likely domesticated in the Deccan near the beginning of the third millennium BCE and spread throughout India, though was later superseded by other millets. Cultivation of Finger millet had spread to South India by 1800 BC. Various millets have been mentioned in some of the Yajurveda texts, identifying foxtail millet (priyaṅgu), Barnyard millet (aṇu) and black finger millet (śyāmāka), indicating that millet cultivation was happening around 1200 BC in India.

=== Africa ===
Finger millet is native to the highlands of East Africa and was domesticated before the third millennium BC. Pearl millet (Pennisetum glaucum) was domesticated in the Sahel region of West Africa from Pennisetum violaceum. Early archaeological evidence in Africa includes finds at Birimi in northern Ghana (1740 cal BC) and Dhar Tichitt in Mauritania (1936–1683 cal BC) and the lower Tilemsi valley in Mali (2500 to 2000 cal BC). Studies of isozymes suggest domestication took place north east of the Senegal River in the far west of the Sahel and tentatively around 6000 BC.

=== Europe ===
Broomcorn or proso millet (Panicum miliaceum) came to Europe from East Asia as early as the 17th century BC in Vinogradnyi Sad, Ukraine (modern Mykolaiv Oblast). At around 1500 BC it reached Italy and southeastern Europe; around 1400 BC it came to central Europe, and from 1200 BC, it arrived in northern Germany.

== Agriculture ==
=== Cultivation ===
Pearl millet is one of the two major dryland crops (alongside sorghum) in the semiarid, impoverished, less fertile agriculture regions of Africa and southeast Asia. Millets are not only adapted to poor, dry infertile soils, but they are also more reliable under these conditions than most other grain crops.

Millets, however, do respond to high fertility and moisture. On a per-hectare basis, millet grain production can be 2 to 4 times higher with use of irrigation and soil supplements. Improved varieties of millet with enhanced disease resistance can significantly increase farm yield. There has been cooperation between poor countries to improve millet yields. For example, 'Okashana 1', a variety developed in India from a natural-growing millet variety in Burkina Faso, doubled yields. This variety was selected for trials in Zimbabwe. From there it was taken to Namibia, where it was released in 1990 and enthusiastically adopted by farmers. 'Okashana 1' became the most popular variety in Namibia, the only non-Sahelian country where pearl millet—locally known as mahangu—is the dominant food staple for consumers. 'Okashana 1' was then introduced to Chad. The variety has significantly enhanced yields in Mauritania and Benin.

Upon request by the Indian Government in 2018, the Food and Agriculture Organisation of the United Nations declared 2023 as International Year of Millets.

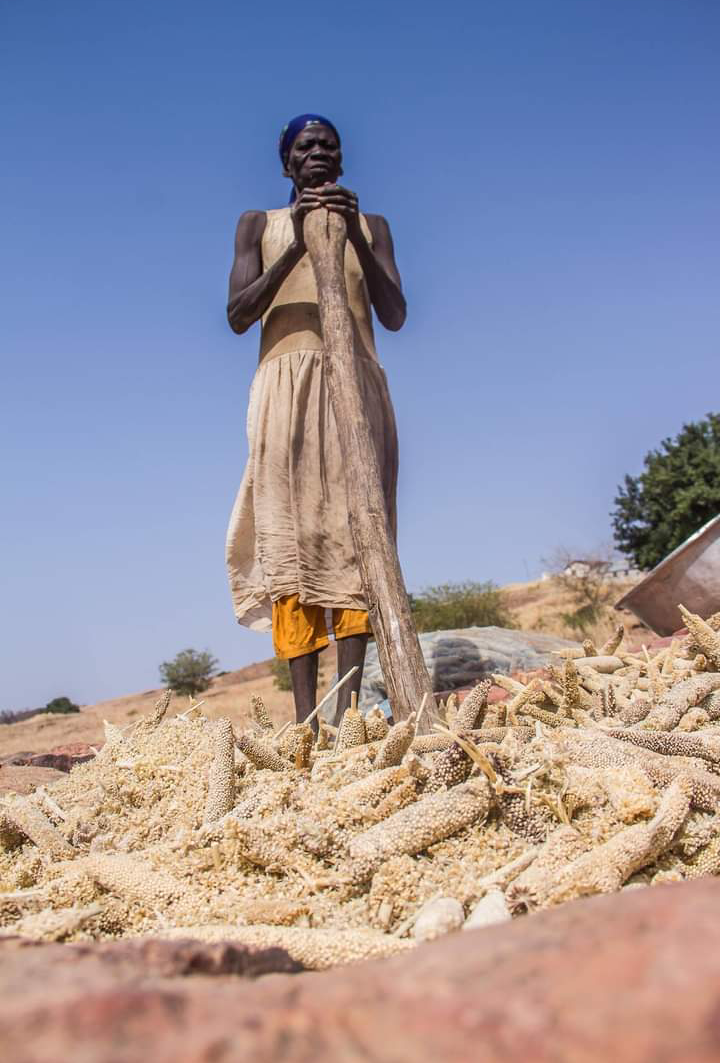
A woman threshing pearl millet in Northern Ghana

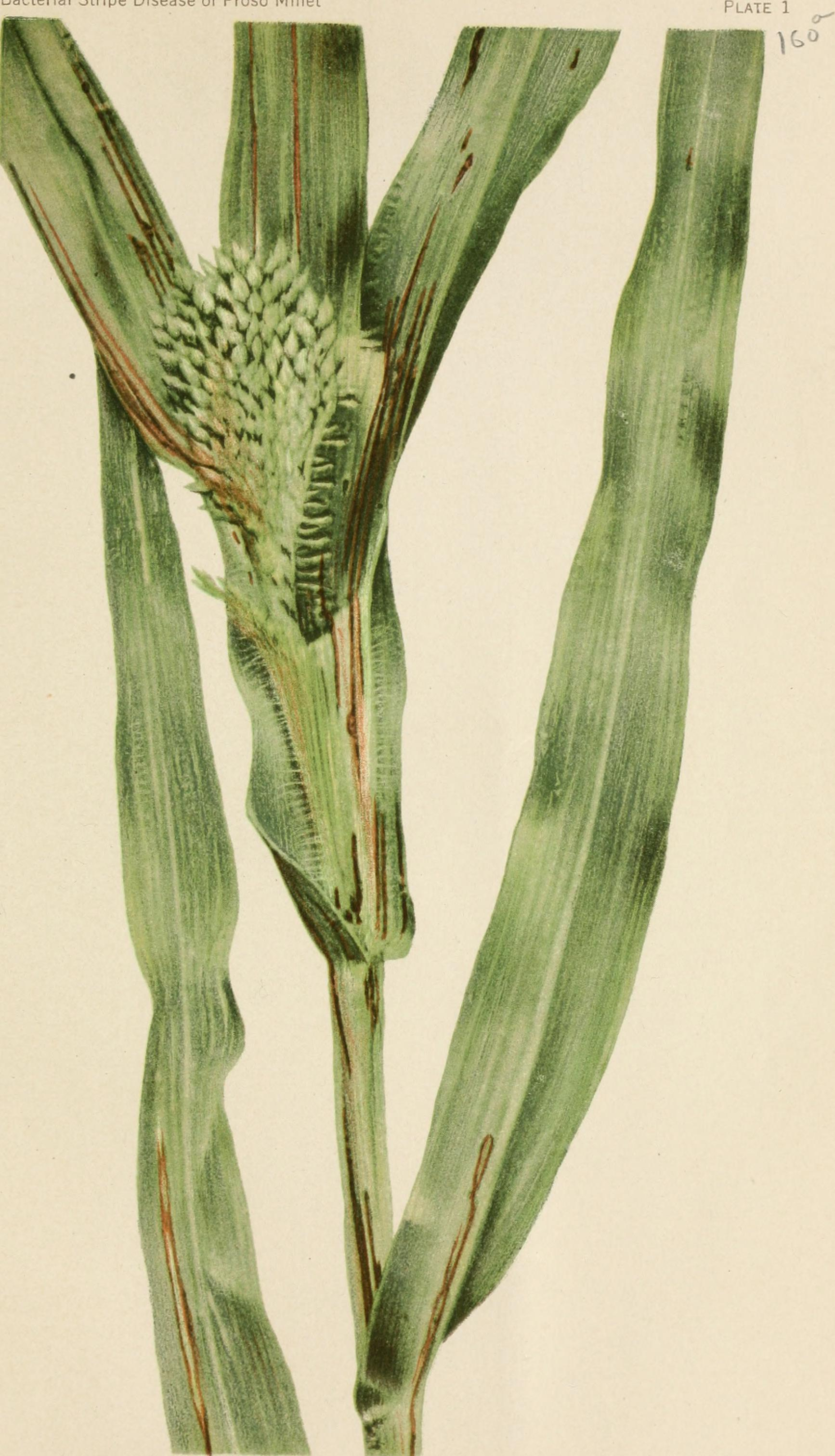
Proso millet with bacterial stripe disease

=== Pests and diseases ===
Millets are subject to damage by many insect pests, including corn borers, stemborers, the caterpillars of numerous moths in the families Erebidae and Noctuidae, the millet midge, many species of flies in the Muscidae, as well as Hemipteran bugs of many families including aphids, and species of thrips, beetles, and grasshoppers.

Among the many diseases of millets are serious fungal infections such as anthracnose, blast, charcoal rot, downy mildew, ergot, grain mould, rust, and sheath rot. Bacterial diseases are generally less serious; they include bacterial leaf spot, leaf stripe and leaf streak. Viral diseases are again generally less serious, except for a few diseases such as maize stripe virus, maize mosaic virus, sorghum red stripe virus, and maize streak virus.

=== Production ===
In 2024, world production of millet was 31 million tonnes, led by India with 41% of the total (table).

millions of tonnes
India	12.6
Niger	3.8
China	2.8
Mali	2.0
Nigeria	1.6
World	30.8
Source: FAOSTAT of the United Nations

Production of millet

International millet yields, in metric tonnes per hectare, 2024

=== Research ===
Research on millets is carried out by the International Crops Research Institute for the Semi-Arid Tropics (ICRISAT) and ICAR-Indian Institute of Millets Research in Telangana, India, and by the United States Department of Agriculture's Agricultural Research Service at Tifton, Georgia, United States.

== Uses ==
=== Food and drink ===
Per capita consumption of millets as food varies in different parts of the world, with consumption being the highest in Western Africa. Millet has local significance as a food in parts of some countries, such as China, India, Burma and North Korea.

Millet is a staple in the Sahel region of Africa, accounting for a large portion of total cereal food consumption in Burkina Faso, Chad and the Gambia. It can be ground and mixed with milk to make fura and brukina. Countries in Africa where millets are a major food source include Niger and Namibia where it forms over 65% of the cereals eaten; it is significant, too, in Mali, Senegal, Ethiopia, Nigeria and Uganda. Millet is important in the drier parts of many other countries, especially in eastern and central Africa, and in the northern coastal countries of western Africa. Fermented beverages are made with millet in the same regions.

In Ukraine, millet was historically a common ingredient in the diet of the Zaporozhian Cossacks, in the form of a porridge called kulish. This dish, primarily made with millet, served with stewed vegetables and meat, cooked in a cauldron, remains a part of modern Ukrainian cuisine. In Germany, it is eaten sweet, for example with milk and berries for breakfast. In Russia, millet porridge also remains common and is promoted for its health benefits. Millet porridge made with pumpkin is particularly common. In the Lipetsk Oblast, ritual and daily meals from millet include chichi (Russian: чичи), which are millet fritters.

Millet is commonly eaten in India and usually incorporated into dishes as a flour, although consumption is declining. In Karnataka, India, finger millet is made into ragi rotti flatbread and ragi mudde dough lumps. In the Himalayas, including in Nepal, Sikkim, and Darjeeling, millet is fermented into alcoholic beverages such as tongba and raksi. Millet is the main ingredient in bánh đa kê, a Vietnamese sweet snack. It contains a layer of smashed millet and mung bean topped with sliced dried coconut meat wrapped in a crunchy rice cake.

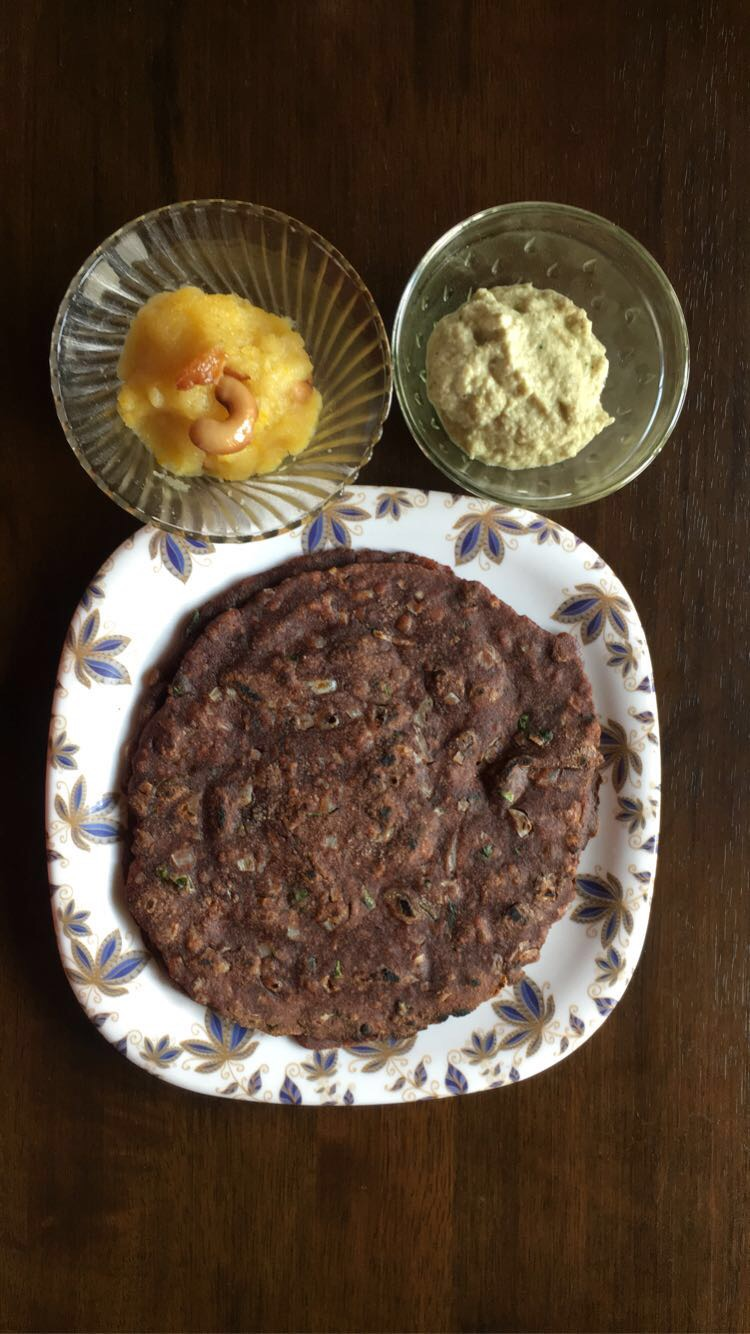
Ragi rotti, finger millet flatbread, Karnataka, India

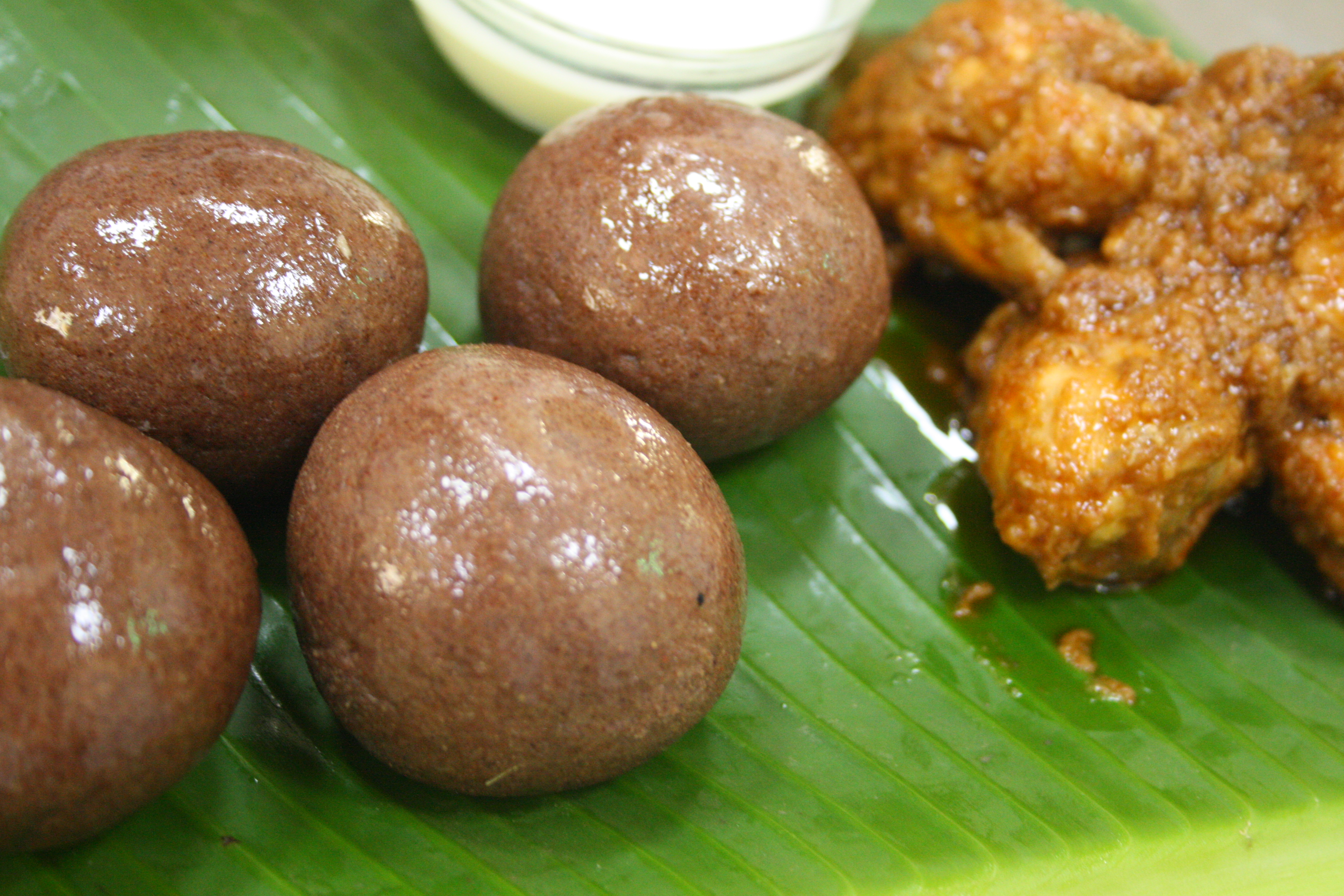
Ragi mudde, dough lumps of finger millet

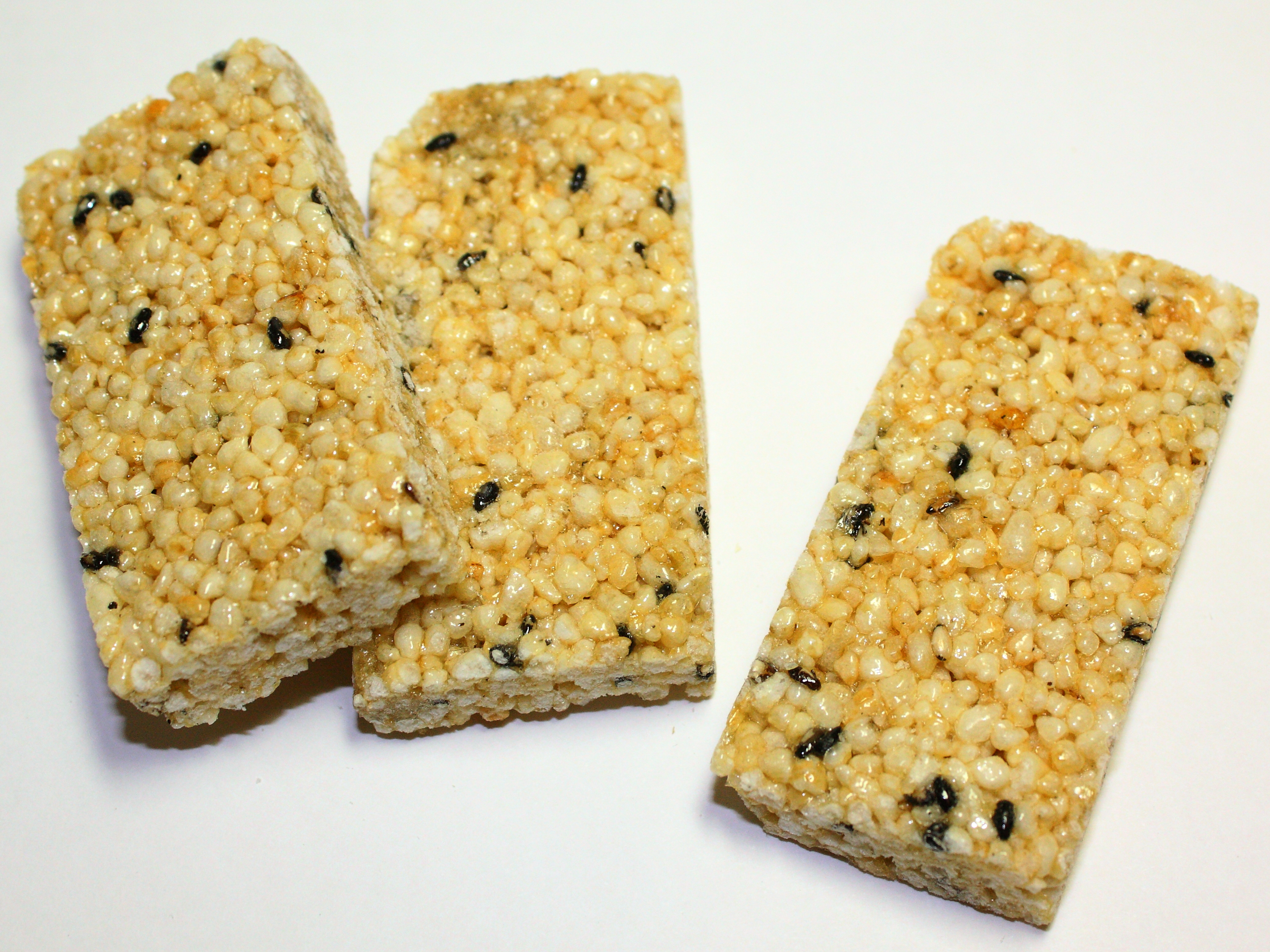
Awaokoshi, candied millet puffs, are a specialty of Osaka, Japan.

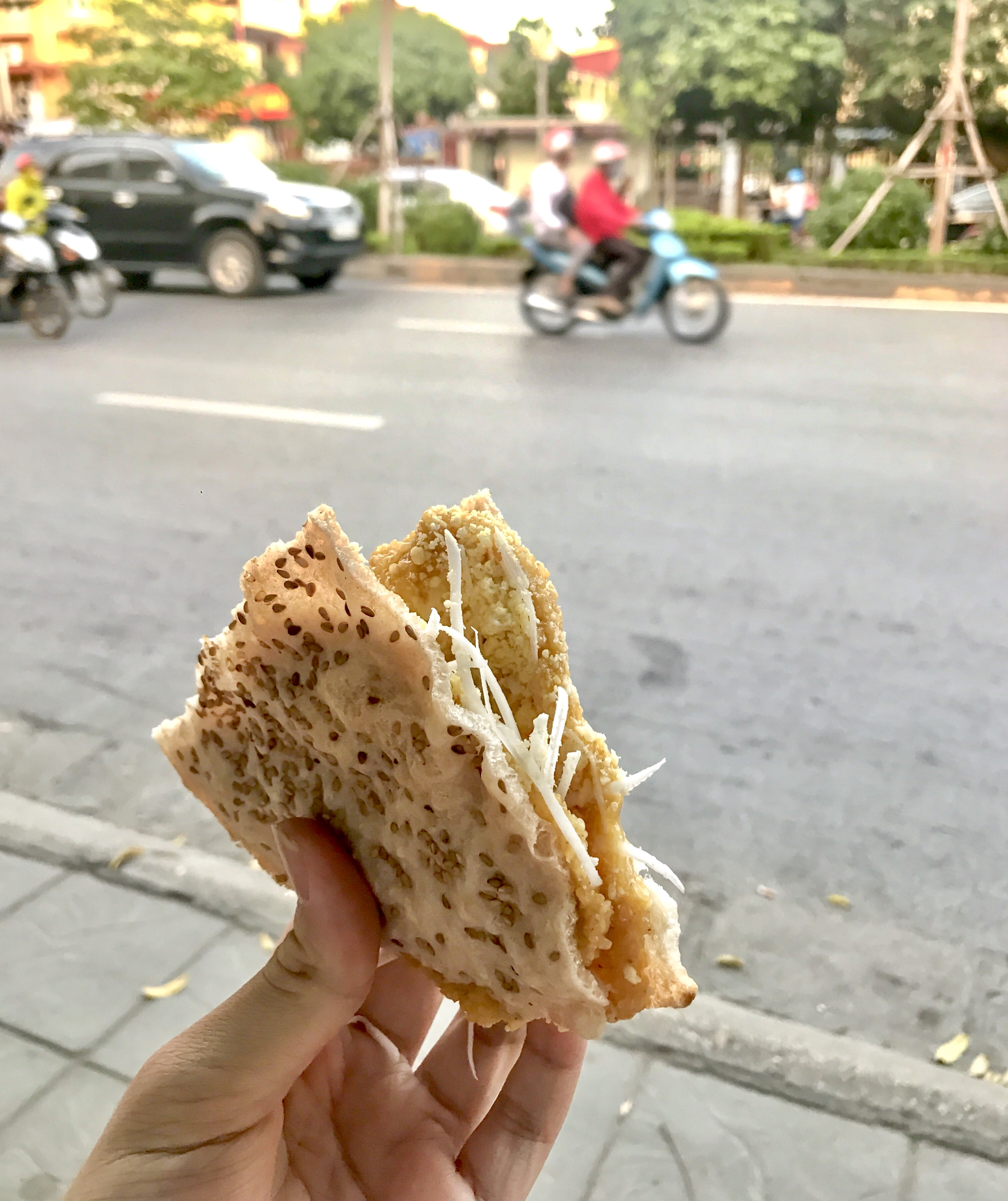
Bánh đa kê, a specialty sweet snack in Hanoi, Vietnam

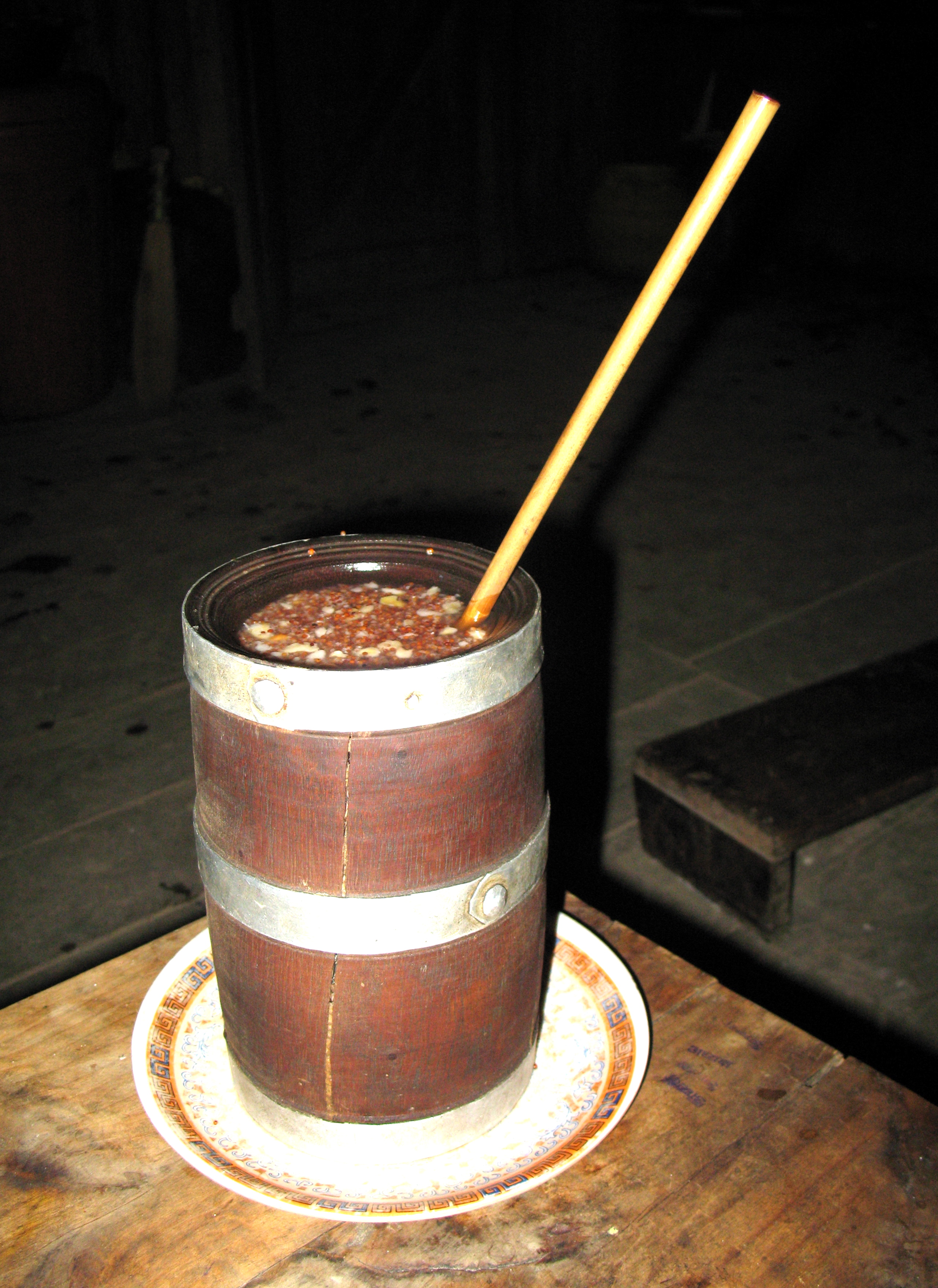
Tongba, a millet-based alcoholic brew from Nepal and Sikkim

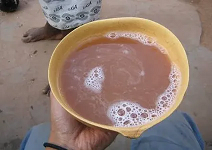
Brukutu, a beer made using Guinea corn and millet in Nigeria

=== Forage ===
Millet is sometimes used as a forage crop, to produce animal feed. Compared to forage sorghum, animals including lambs gain weight faster on millet, and it has better hay or silage potential, although it produces less dry matter. Millet does not contain toxic prussic acid, sometimes found in sorghum. The rapid growth of millet allows flexibility in its use as a grazing crop. Farmers can wait until sufficient late spring / summer moisture is present to make use of it. It is ideally suited to irrigation where livestock finishing is required.

=== Nutrition ===
Nutrient content of raw millets compared to other grains (per 100g)
Crop	Protein (g)	Fibre (g)	Minerals (g)	Iron (mg)	Calcium (mg)
Sorghum	10	4	1.6	2.6	54
Pearl millet	10.6	1.3	2.3	16.9	38
Finger millet	7.3	3.6	2.7	3.9	344
Foxtail millet	12.3	8	3.3	2.8	31
Proso millet	12.5	2.2	1.9	0.8	14
Kodo millet	8.3	9	2.6	0.5	27
Little millet	7.7	7.6	1.5	9.3	17
Barnyard millet	11.2	10.1	4.4	15.2	11
Brown top millet	11.5	12.5	4.2	0.65	0.01
Quinoa	14.1	7	*	4.6	47
Teff	13	8	0.85	7.6	180
Fonio	11	11.3	5.31	84.8	18
Rice	6.8	0.2	0.6	0.7	10
Wheat	11.8	1.2	1.5	5.3	41

Millets have nutritional profiles comparable to conventional cereals such as wheat and rice. They are also high in protein, fiber, calcium, iron, and zinc.

Millet contains antinutrients, which interfere with the digestion and utilization of nutrients. Millet-heavy diets may contribute to endemic goitre in rural Africa and Asia. Antinutrients can be reduced by processing techniques such as malting, milling, cooking, and fermentation.

People who need a gluten-free diet due to gluten-related disorders such as coeliac disease, non-celiac gluten sensitivity and wheat allergy, can replace gluten-containing cereals in their diets with millet. There remains a risk of contamination with gluten-containing cereals.

== See also ==
- List of ancient dishes and foods
