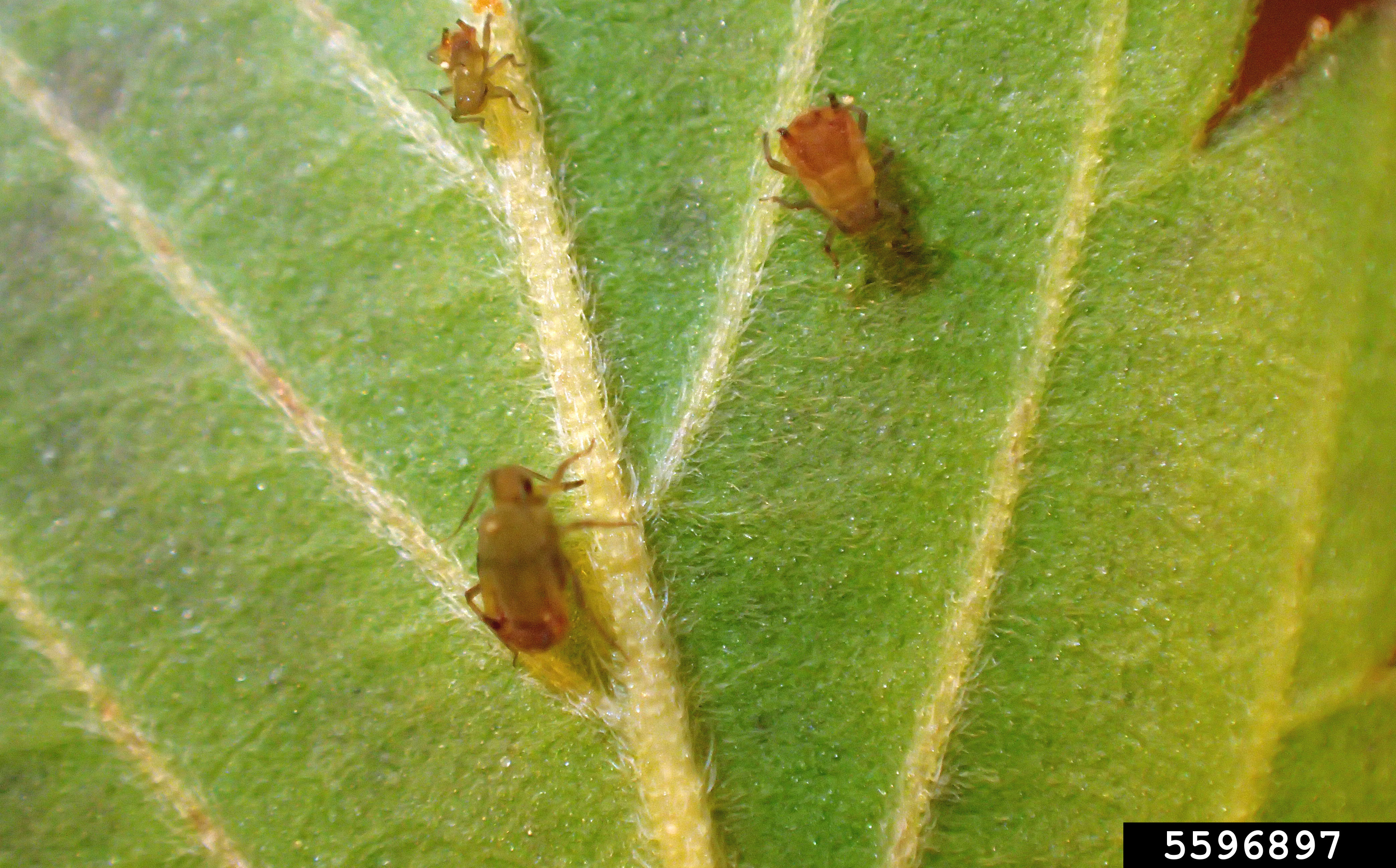
- Nymphs on the underside of a leaf

Scientific classification
- Kingdom: Animalia
- Phylum: Arthropoda
- Clade: Pancrustacea
- Class: Insecta
- Order: Hemiptera
- Suborder: Sternorrhyncha
- Family: Aphididae
- Subfamily: Aphidinae
- Tribe: Aphidini
- Genus: Rhopalosiphum
- Species: R. rufiabdominale

Binomial name
- Rhopalosiphum rufiabdominale (Sasaki, 1899)

Synonyms
- R. rufiabdominalis; R. californica (Essig, 1944); R. gnaphalii (Tissot, 1933); R. mume (Hori, 1927); R. oryzae (Matsumura, 1917); R. papaveri (Takahashi, 1921); R. setigera (Blanchard, 1939); R. shelkovnikovi (Mordvilko, 1921); R. splendens (Theobald, 1915); R. subterraneum (Mason, 1937); Toxoptera rufiabdominalis (Sasaki, 1899)

= Rhopalosiphum rufiabdominale =

Rice root aphid

Species of aphid

Rhopalosiphum rufiabdominale, the rice root aphid or red rice root aphid, is a sap-sucking insect pest with a wide host range and a global distribution. As a member of the superfamily Aphidoidea, it is one of 16 species of the genus Rhopalosiphum. Adults and nymphs are soft-bodied and usually dark green with brown, red, or yellow tones. Like all aphids, reproduction is sexual and asexual, depending on the environmental conditions and host plant. Rice root aphids cause injury to external plant parts, namely the roots or stem, by feeding on plant sap and vector several important plant viruses. The hosts of this pest extend across multiple plant families with most belonging to Rosaceae, Poaceae, and Solanaceae. R. rufiabdominale is universally associated with Prunus species but also infests various field crops, greenhouse vegetables, cannabis, and other ornamental plants. While this aphid originates from east Asia, it spans nearly every continent. Dispersal is particularly widespread across the United States, India, and Australia, with crop damage documented in multiple instances, although economic losses are primarily associated with Japanese rice crops. Nonetheless, it remains a pest of serious concern due to its high mobility, discrete habitat, and adaptive plasticity, giving it the rightful reputation as a successful invader.

== Description ==
=== Identification ===
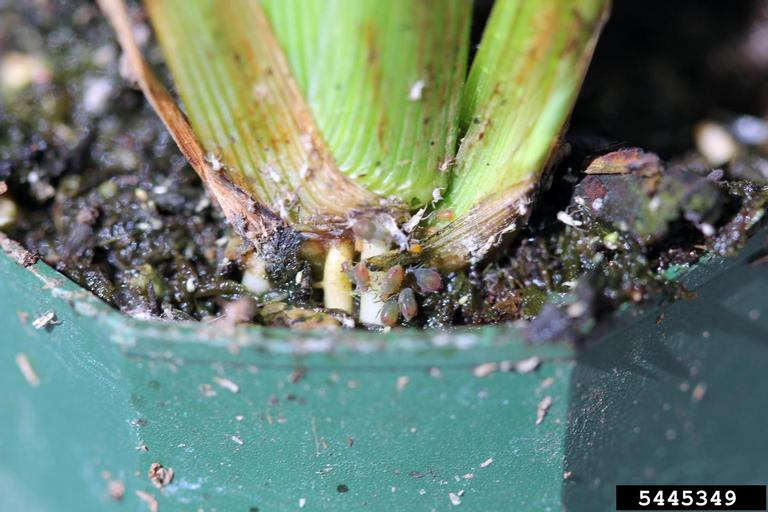
Rice root aphids at the base of a rice plant

Initial detection can be difficult as root aphids preferred surroundings are in the soil or media. However, it can also infest the roots of crops grown in both hydroponic and aeroponic systems. Connecting the pest with plant symptoms is often delayed or unknown unless roots are carefully inspected, or winged adults are present above ground. In hydroponic systems, irrigation events may bring aphids to surface level for short periods making them more visible. Plant irregularities such as chlorosis and stunting can be mistaken as a nutritional imbalance and wilting as a disease. As population densities increase, winged adults can emerge from fissures in the soil upwards to the crop canopy to populate elsewhere. If sticky traps are employed, it may be the first indication of their presence. Ants have a mutualistic relationship with aphids and are attracted to the honeydew they produce; their presence is a strong indication that aphids are populating.

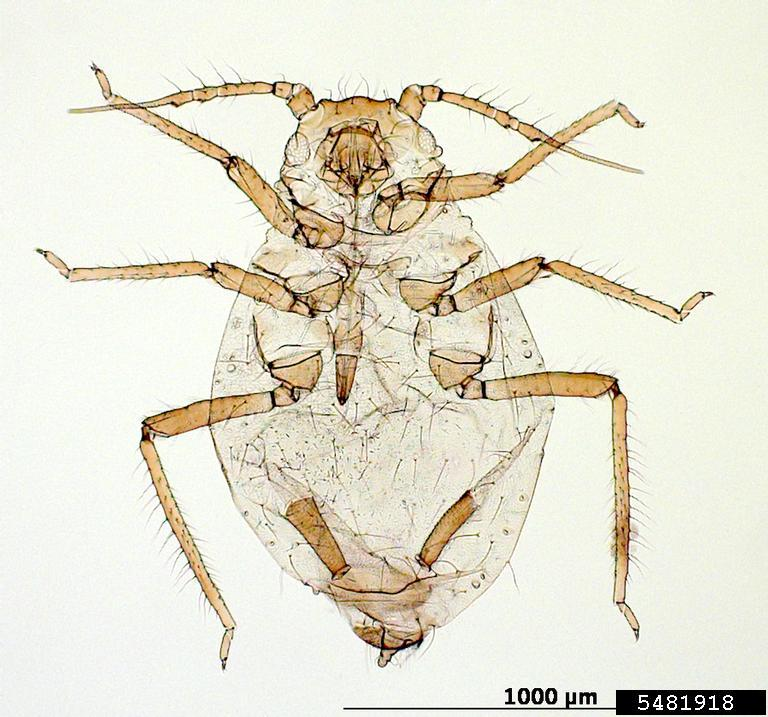
Adult female rice root aphid

=== Morphology ===
Adults are 1.4-2.4 mm long with a soft rounded body; they are distinguished from Rhopalosiphum padi by their five antennal segments and more dense setae. Wingless forms range in coloration; the body can be dark green to brown with yellow or red tinges. Winged forms tend to display a darker coloration, and both life stages have a lateral bluish-white wax that bands across the dorsal region. The femora, cornicles, and cauda are darker than the other body parts. Body hairs, known as setae, are generally short and dense while the hairs on the five segmented antennae are longer. The antennal tubercles are reduced or nearly absent compared to other species. The cauda, a tail-like extension, is shorter than the cornicles syn. siphuncles, which are also rather short and slightly swollen towards the tips.

=== Biology ===
Unique to root aphids, most of their life cycle occurs below ground, with winged adults only emerging from soil to colonize new host plants. In their native range, rice root aphids have a heteroecious holocyclic life cycle. They alternate between the aerial plant parts of Prunus species through the fall and winter while colonizing other herbaceous hosts' roots for the remainder of the year. In more temperate regions or protected cultivation, reproduction is frequently performed asexually, usually on secondary hosts. With this method, parthenogenesis, no fertilization is required for egg development; females give birth to genetically identical daughter offspring. These newly emerged nymphs mature in less than ten days. As adults, they live up to thirty days reproducing daily. Under ideal conditions, temperatures of 23 degrees Celsius, a new generation occurs every seven days, and populations are known to double in less than two days. Mitotically derived eggs are also produced if necessary, to overwinter until environmental conditions improve. While they prefer below surface locations, winged adults can persist for weeks on aerial plant parts. Rice root aphids have a rasping-sucking mouthpart that facilitates the efficient removal of plant phloem. Both nymphs and adults feed on all development stages seedling, vegetative, or flowering, but survival can be limited to a few days without a host plant present.

== Ecology ==
=== Distribution ===
Rice root aphid is a Palearctic species that are distributed worldwide, in every terrestrial habitat, except for Antarctica. From Japan, it has migrated throughout Asia and Oceania and is now established in over fifty countries as an occasional or severe pest of many important growing regions. It has been present in North America for over a hundred years and can be found throughout Canada and the United States. Within American borders, the pest is particularly advanced and has been identified in nearly half of the fifty-two states. The spread has extended to other areas, including seven African and South American countries and three European countries. Each of these nations has had difficulty with this pest, especially those with expansive agricultural or horticultural regions.

=== Plant hosts ===
R. rufiabdominale is a highly polyphagous species with a broad host range distributed across twenty-two plant families. The majority of hosts are found in the following plant families: Rosaceae, Poaceae, Cyperaceae, Solanaceae, Cannabaceae, Pinaceae, or Cucurbitaceae. In Europe, it was reported that rice root aphid will also colonize host plants belonging to Araceae, Asteraceae and Ranunculaceae. Research has shown that they can infest a large number of dicotyledonous plants, although their affinity lies predominantly within monocotyledon taxonomic groups. This preference is similar to the closely related R. maidis and R. padi and is especially true for plants that belong to the family Poaceae. The main plant hosts are categorized and listed below.

- Agriculture crops including cereals, grains, and grasses: **rice**, **barley**, **wheat**, oats, millet, sorghum, **cotton**, **sugarcane**, and tobacco
- Vegetable crops: **aubergine**, tomato, pepper, potato, corn, cauliflower, celery, and squash
- Ornamental plants and fruit trees: **Prunus spp.** (17 known stone fruit and ornamental trees and shrubs), **grasses**, Dieffenbachia spp., and irises
- Other: cannabis sativa, sedge, and forestry trees

*Primary hosts are denoted in bold

== Impact ==
While rice root aphid damage had been reasonably chronicled, the economic effects are far less documented. It may be due in part to the aphids subterranean habitat or unknown influence on overall plant fitness. In terms of economic importance, crops such as rice, barley, wheat, potato, tomato, plum, and apricot top the list. R. rufiabdominale is considered one of the most abundant aphids affecting wheat and grain crops in the United States. In both Europe and Canada, root aphid has been cataloged as a persistent or occasional pest in hydroponically grown plants with the first infestation in Ontario greenhouse tomatoes and peppers occurring in 2005. This presents implications for those commodities and cereal crops in the region that are highly susceptible to barley yellow dwarf virus, an economically important barley disease. In 2005, the first holocyclic colony outside of eastern Asia was reported in Italy. The aphid completed its life cycle on Prunus domestica, the common plum, and Prunus armeniaca, apricot, leading to concerns for Poaceae and stone fruit crops in the temperate region. More recently, rice root aphid has been frequently reported as a severe pest of indoor-grown cannabis in Canada and the United States. With no pause between crop cycles, limited research, or treatments available, it has become highly problematic to manage. The recent legalization of cannabis in eleven states in the United States and nationally in Canada has increased the dialogue and studies. Still, approval at a federal level is needed to elevate the research and funding to develop management strategies across stakeholders.

=== Damage ===
Adults and nymphs externally feed on the roots and occasionally the stem, passively consuming the phloem, causing vigor loss. The feeding sites' location can become discolored and leaves or stems, chlorotic or pale. Plant parts may also appear desiccated and distorted or display the formation of rosettes. High pest densities can cause wilting of the whole plant and result in death. In rice, it is well documented that injury causes leaf chlorosis and stunted growth with severe infestations exhibiting wilt followed by plant death. Aphids also produce honeydew; the deposits can promote mold or fungal growth known as sooty mold. Below the surface, this may resemble a light dusty halo, not dissimilar to powdery mildew spots. Even outside of typical host range, serious indirect consequences among plants can occur due to their stylet's investigative probe that transfers saliva resulting in serious plant disease transmission. This indirect injury can vector sugar cane yellow leaf virus and barley yellow dwarf virus. In India, it has been reported to transmit maize mosaic virus and sugarcane mosaic virus.

=== Losses ===
The most widely referenced literature is associated with upland rice crops in Japan. It is reported that yield declines of up to 50% due to light feeding on seedlings, followed by severe damage at tiller formation. In the summer of 1990, the aphid appeared as a major pest of a squash crop in Florida, causing the roots to darken and rot. However, there was no mention of economic loss. The pest was more recently identified, for the first time, as severely damaging an organic celery crop in California. While Hyadaphis foeniculi, honeysuckle aphid, was also detected and uncommon pest for celery, the combined infestation resulted in yield losses of up to 80% due to severe stunting. Periodic losses due to barley yellow dwarf virus have been described in North America and Europe, including Turkey, where barley cropping is commonplace.

== Management ==
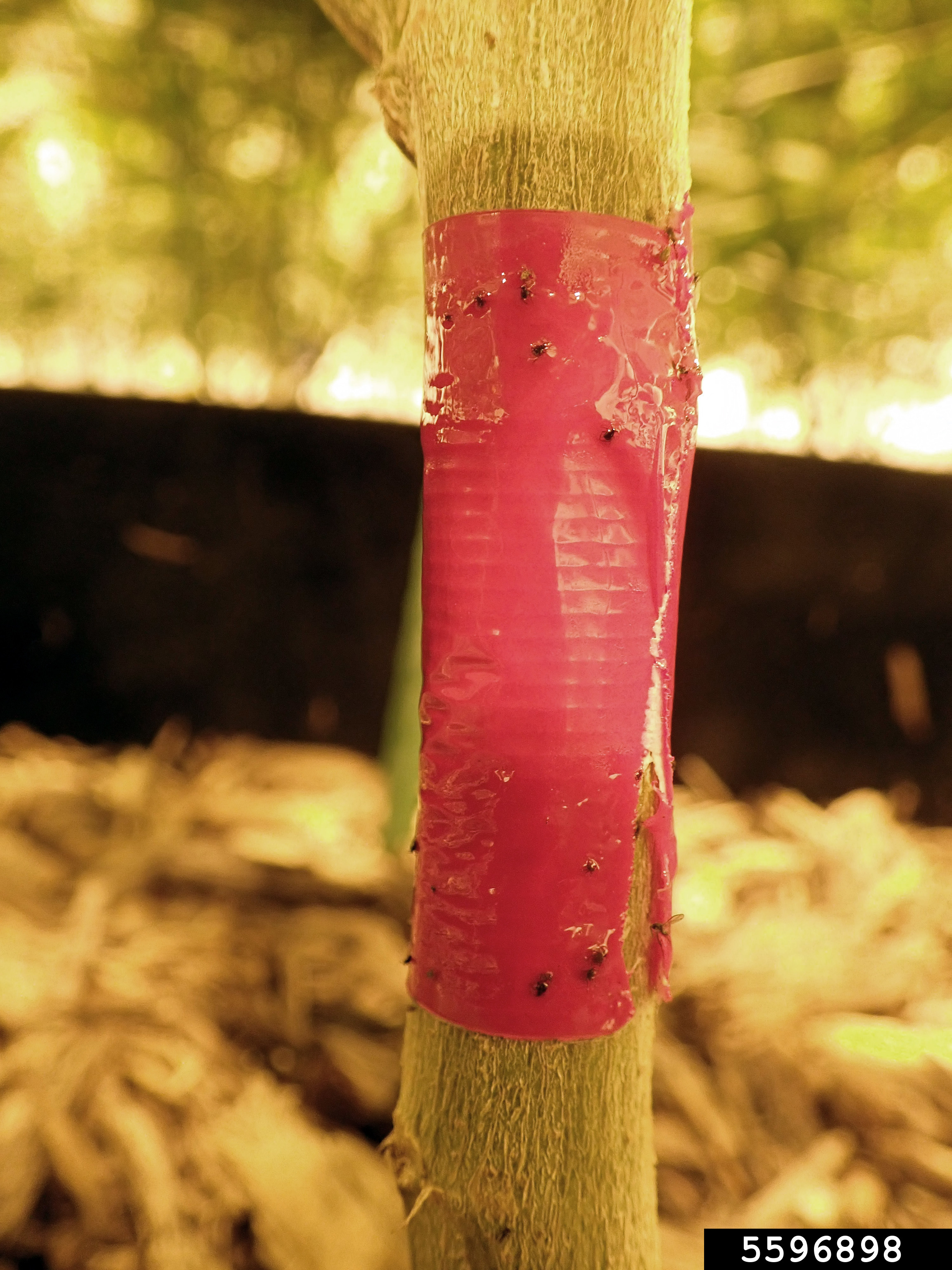
Sticky band on the stem of a plant to detect and limit dispersal of rice root aphid

The most effective approach farmers use when regulating rice root aphid is integrated pest management system. This is because of the aphid residing below the soil line, limiting biological control options and rendering foliar insecticides ineffective. It is very common for farmers to use preventative measures through cultural and physical controls in conjunction with carefully selected biological control organisms and judicious use of bio-pesticides, as it is thought to be the most effective way of removing rice root aphids.

=== Physical and cultural control ===
In late spring, winged adults are known to migrate to new hosts both in the field and greenhouses. Physical exclusion with netting or screens can prevent the colonization of the roots. For overwintering eggs that persist in soil or media, heat sterilization could be employed. However, this treatment has been shown to reduce microorganism diversity. Procuring certified substrates can reduce the risk of introduction in specialized media. It may also be important to use coarse or chipped media instead of fine-textured particles. Root aphids are known to appear in greater abundance when reared in sandy soil.

Disruption of requisites through crop rotation or fallowing to establish a host-free period can be useful as this species may display an affinity to particular cultivars. Reducing favorable conditions or locations that harbor root aphids can also suppress establishment. Removing other plant and weed hosts, especially herbaceous monocots, is another simple tactic to implement. Moving away from using mulched top dressing, preferred by this pest, may also reduce the chance of infestation.

=== Biological and biopesticide control ===
For winged adults, several natural enemies used for other aphid species may prove useful. These include Coccinellids, known as the ladybird beetles, Aphidoletes aphidimyza, or other syrphid fly larvae and Chrysoperla species, the green or brown lacewings. Several species of Aphelinus, a parasitic wasp, will also feed on winged adults but should not be relied upon for sufficient control. The only potential soil-dwelling biological control agent is Stratiolaelaps scimitus syn. Hypoaspis miles. It is a generalist predator commonly enlisted to target fungus gnat larvae. Still, it may offer some below ground suppression of rice root aphid.

In the early 1990s Lecanicillium lecanii, formerly Verticillium lecanii, was discovered by chance after a marked decline of rice root aphid levels among infested squash plants without deliberate intervention. Their death was a result of infection by the entomopathogenic fungus, which consumes the aphid internally. After subsequent inoculations on other crops, the assertion was made that suppression could be achieved, leading to its routine use on the pest. A 2014 study in organic cropping systems suggests that non-chemical control using microbials and botanicals can reduce sub-soil pest populations in organic vegetable crops. Soil treatments of Beauveria bassiana, in conjunction with azadirachtin, neem oil reduced aphid populations by 62% after two applications. Further, Chromobacterium subtsugae and Burkholderia spp. showed a reduction of 29% and 24%, respectively. Differences in efficacy between modes of action and treatment combinations indicate that additional research would enhance pest management decision making. Another application for these types of products includes using them as a cutting dip. Imported plant material can be treated with insecticidal soap or Beauveria bassiana before introduced to production facilities.

=== Chemical control ===
In the past, systemic insecticides have been used to control this pest. The availability and application frequency of these types of products has declined with more recent concerns surrounding pest resistance, persistence in soils and water, accumulation in the food chain, and reductions of natural enemy populations. Many of these pesticide formulations are now prohibited for use; this includes endosulfan, one of the few insecticides known to be effective against rice root aphids. Carbofuran, a chemical soil treatment, once touted as a useful tool, is now proven to be highly toxic with environmental and ecological implications that negatively affect multitrophic level interactions. With scant chemical products and further reassessments and de-registrations expected as research evolves, this control method remains an unviable option for rice root aphid.
