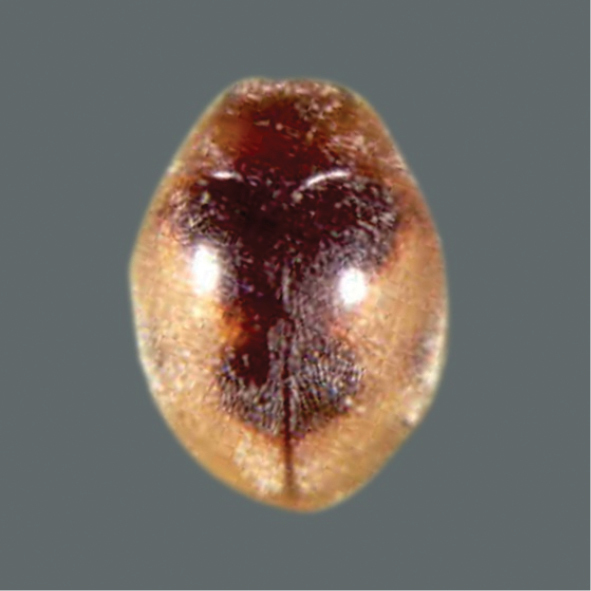

Scientific classification
- Kingdom: Animalia
- Phylum: Arthropoda
- Clade: Pancrustacea
- Class: Insecta
- Order: Coleoptera
- Suborder: Polyphaga
- Infraorder: Cucujiformia
- Family: Coccinellidae
- Genus: Scymnus
- Species: S. coccivora

Binomial name
- Scymnus coccivora Ayyar, 1925

Synonyms
- Pullus coccidivora (Chelliah 1965); Scymnus (Pullus) elegans (Sicard 1929); Scymnus (Pullus) elegans var. clathratus Sicard, 1929

= Scymnus coccivora =

Species of beetle

Scymnus (Pullus) coccivora, is a species of lady beetle found in India, Bangladesh, Sri Lanka, Malaysia, and Pakistan and probably in Thailand, Bermuda, British Virgin Islands, Grenada, Saint Kitts and Nevis, Trinidad and Tobago and Papua New Guinea.

== Description ==
Total length of adult is about 1.70 to 1.90 mm. It is a small ladybird with an elongate oval and moderately convex body. Dorsal surface clothed with dense pubescence. Body color ranges from pale golden yellow to yellowish brown. Eyes are small. Maculae on elytra is purple brown. Elytra has an hourglass shaped longitudinal marking which is found in the basal half. There are two small circular discal spots found on the posterior half of elytra. Antennae with 11 antennomeres. Abdominal postcoxal line is semi circular and complete.

== Biology ==
It is a predator of wide range of whiteflies, mealybugs and aphids including: Planococcus citri, Maconellicoccus hirsutus, Ferrisia virgata, Icerya aegyptiaca, Phenacoccus solenopsis, Pulvinaria psidii, Aphis craccivora, Brevicoryne brassicae, Lipaphis erysimi, Myzus persicae, Aphis gossypii, Hyadaphis coriandri, Hysteroneura setariae, Ropalosiphum maidis, Therioaphis trifolii, Macrosiphum granarium, Schizaphis graminum, Drosicha mangiferae, Tetranychus atlanticus and Rastrococcus iceryoides.

Adults can be controlled by applying the systemic insecticide thiamethoxam.
