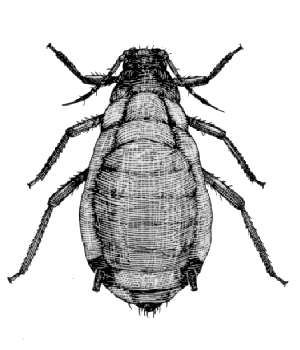

Scientific classification
- Kingdom: Animalia
- Phylum: Arthropoda
- Clade: Pancrustacea
- Class: Insecta
- Order: Hemiptera
- Suborder: Sternorrhyncha
- Family: Aphididae
- Genus: Rhopalosiphum
- Species: R. maidis

Binomial name
- Rhopalosiphum maidis (Fitch, 1856)

Synonyms
- Aphis maidis Fitch, 1856

= Rhopalosiphum maidis =

Species of true bug

Rhopalosiphum maidis, common names corn leaf aphid and corn aphid, is an insect, and a pest of maize and other crops. It has a nearly worldwide distribution and is typically found in agricultural fields, grasslands, and forest-grassland zones. Among aphids that feed on maize, it is the most commonly encountered and most economically damaging, particularly in tropical and warmer temperate areas. In addition to maize, R. maidis damages rice, sorghum, and other cultivated and wild monocots.

== Description ==
The bodies of wingless parthenogenetic females are green or whitish-green. The head, antennae, legs, cornicles, tail, and transverse bands on the abdomen are black-brown. The body has sparse short hairs. The length of the antennae is less than half the length of the body. Cornicles are not longer than the finger-like tail. In winged females, the head and thoracic section are black-brown and the cornicles are shorter than in the wingless females.

Most R. maidis populations are anholocyclic, i.e. reproduction occurs entirely by parthenogenesis. However, sexual reproduction has been reported in Pakistan and Korea, with Prunus ssp. as the primary host. In populations in Japan and Kenya, males but not sexually reproducing females have been found.

== Agricultural interactions ==
In winter, winged parthenogenetic females and larvae survive on wild-growing monocots, from which they move to agricultural fields in the spring. Fields populate gradually, starting from the edges to the center. Reproduction is rapid, with up to twelve generations per year. The aphid population reaches a maximum late in the summer.

Dense populations of R. maidis on maize (Zea mays) can cause direct damage through the removal of photosynthates. Large amounts of honeydew that is deposited by aphid feeding on maize tassels can prevent pollen shed and decrease yield by up to 90%. Several damaging maize viruses, including Maize yellow dwarf virus, Barley yellow dwarf virus, Sugarcane mosaic virus, and Cucumber mosaic virus, are transmitted by R. maidis.

In addition to feeding on maize, R. maidis infests a variety of cultivated grasses, including wheat, barley, oat, rye, sorghum, sugarcane, and rice. Barley is a particularly suitable host for R. maidis, though there also is considerable within-species variation in resistance.

== Chemical ecology ==
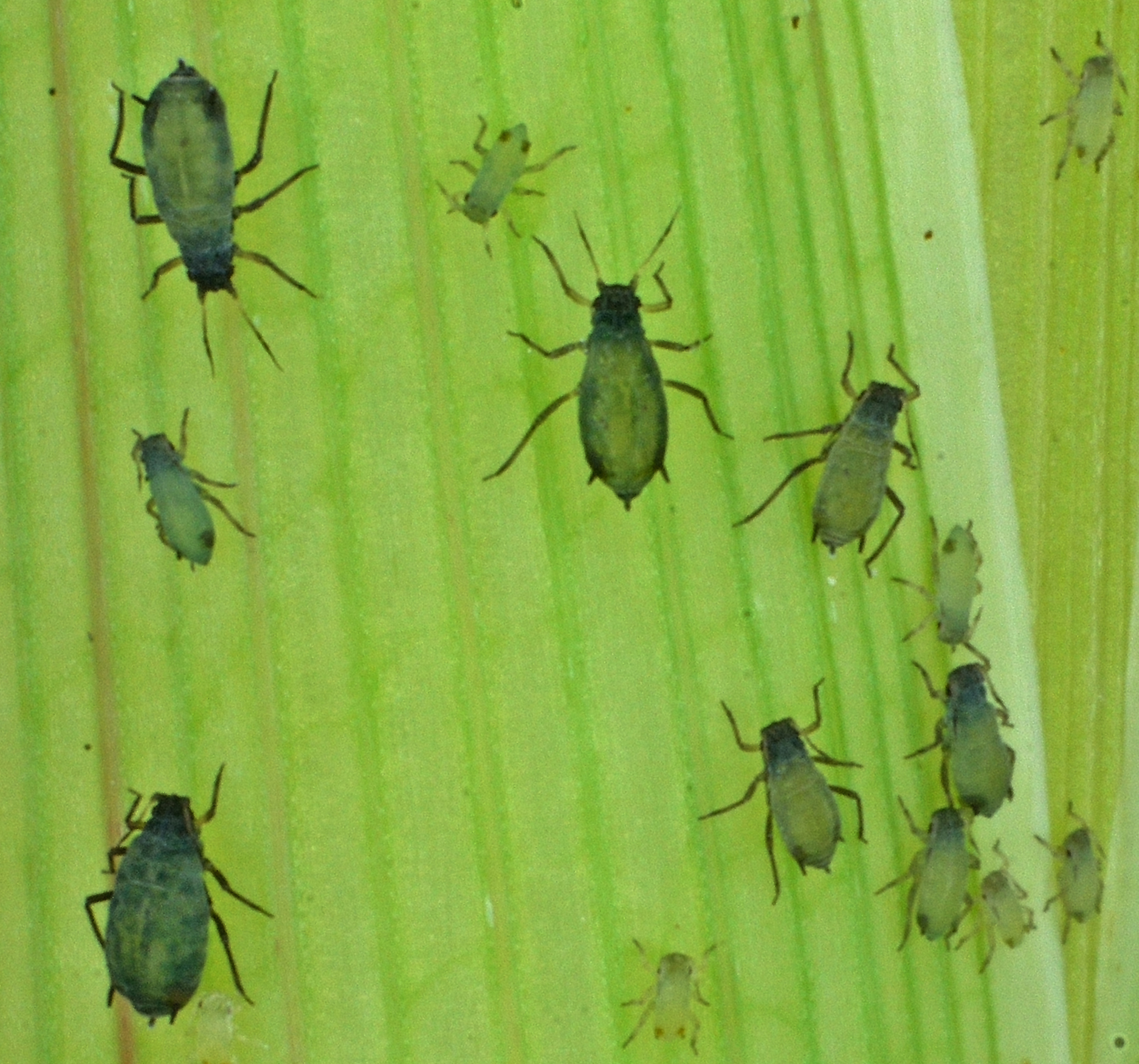
Rhopalosiphum maidis (corn leaf aphids) on Zea mays (maize)

Under enhanced CO_{2} conditions, the growth rate and reproduction of R. maidis on barley were significantly decreased. Volatiles of barley grown under enhanced CO_{2} were also less attractive than those from plants grown under atmospheric CO_{2}. Temperature and crowding have differential effects on wing formation in parthenogenetically reproducing R. maidis on barley.

Maize inbred lines vary in their resistance to R. maidis and other insect pests. Relative to other maize-feeding aphids (Rhopalosiphum padi, Schizaphis graminum, Sitobion avenae, and Metopolophium dirhodum), R. maidis exhibits a greater tolerance of benzoxazinoids, the most abundant class of maize defensive metabolites. Nevertheless, lineage-specific variation in maize resistance to R. maidis was associated with differences in the abundance of 2,4-dihydroxy-7-methoxy-l,4-benzoxazin-3-one glucoside (DIMBOA-Glc), an abundant maize benzoxazinoid. Both increased DIMBOA-Glc synthesis and reduced conversion to 2-hydroxy-4,7-dimethoxy-1,4-benzoxazin-3-one glucoside (HDMBOA -Glc) can enhance maize seedling resistance to R. maidis. Maize mutations that knock out benzoxazinoid biosynthesis increase R. maidis reproduction. In some instances, caterpillar feeding can enhance the conversion of DIMBOA-Glc to HDMBOA-Glc, thereby increasing maize resistance against R. maidis. The defense signaling molecules 2-oxo-phytodienoic acid (OPDA) and ethylene are involved in regulating maize resistance to R. maidis.

In olfactometer experiments, R. maidis were repelled by volatiles from damaged maize plants. One of the major volatiles emitted by damaged maize is the terpene (E)‐β‐farnesene, which also functions as an alarm pheromone for aphids and thus may be repellent. Mutations of a maize terpene synthase, TPS2, made the plants more attractive for R. maidis.

== Genome sequencing ==
There is within-species variation in the chromosome numbers of R. maidis, with karyotypes of 2n = 8, 9, and 10 having been reported. Whereas R. maidis strains on maize tend to have 2n = 8, those on barley generally have 2n = 10. To better enable research related to ecological interactions, virus transmission, pesticide resistance, and other aspects of the species biology, a high-quality genome was assembled from a parthenogenetic R. maidis lineage collected from maize. The assembled genome is 321 Mb in size and features a total of 17,629 protein-coding genes. Assembly of the genome was facilitated by the extremely low level of heterozygosity in the sequenced R. maidis isolate.

== Hosts ==
- Barley
- Millets
- Rice
- Several Gramineae species
- Sorghums
- Sugarcane
- Wheat
