= SCMV =

SCMV may refer to:

- Sugarcane mosaic virus
- Molina Viña San Pedro Airport
