= Schizaphis hypersiphonata =

Scientific classification
- Domain: Eukaryota
- Kingdom: Animalia
- Phylum: Arthropoda
- Class: Insecta
- Order: Hemiptera
- Suborder: Sternorrhyncha
- Family: Aphididae
- Subfamily: Aphidinae
- Tribe: Aphidini
- Subtribe: Rhopalosiphina
- Genus: Schizaphis
- Species: S. hypersiphonata

Binomial name
- Schizaphis hypersiphonata Basu, 1970

Species of true bug

Schizaphis hypersiphonata, or the Pangola Grass Aphid, is a species of aphid in the family Aphididae.
