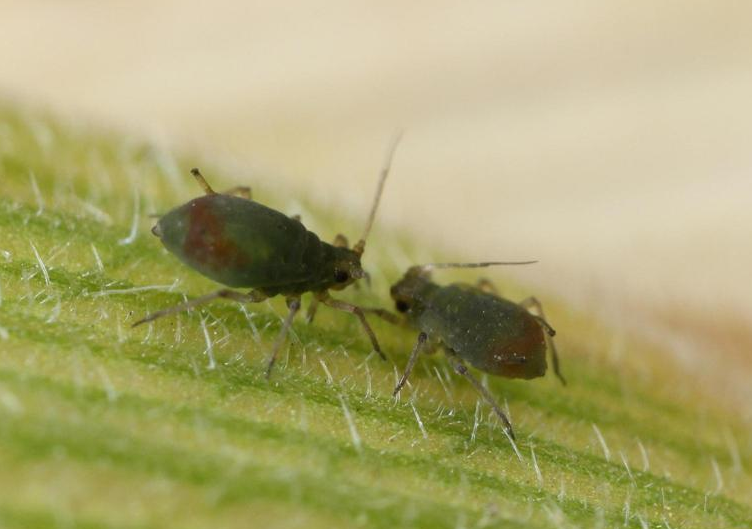
- Bird cherry-oat aphid on corn husk.

Scientific classification
- Kingdom: Animalia
- Phylum: Arthropoda
- Class: Insecta
- Order: Hemiptera
- Suborder: Sternorrhyncha
- Family: Aphididae
- Genus: Rhopalosiphum
- Species: R. padi

Binomial name
- Rhopalosiphum padi (Linnaeus, 1758)

Synonyms
- Aphis padi Linnaeus, 1758

= Rhopalosiphum padi =

Bird cherry-oat aphid

Species of true bug

Bird cherry-oat aphid (Rhopalosiphum padi) is an aphid in the superfamily Aphidoidea in the order Hemiptera. It is a true bug and sucks sap from plants. It is considered a major pest in cereal crops, especially in temperate regions, as well as other hosts in parts of Northern Europe. It is the principal vector of many viruses in economically important field crops.

== Host plants and distribution ==
R. padi has a worldwide distribution and according to research, they can colonize a number of dicotyledon host plants, although their preference is within monocotyledon plant groups much like the closely related R. maidis and R. rufiabdominale. The main plant hosts are categorized and listed below but as the name suggests, the primary host is Prunus padus, where it overwinters as eggs. In Northern America, it is found to overwinter on Prunus virginiana (common choke-cherry). In spring, it attacks all major cereals and pasture grasses; particularly barley, oats, wheat and other Gramineae plant species. It is also commonly found in maize growing regions.

== Virus vector ==
Bird cherry-oat aphid can vector a number of serious diseases including the barley yellow dwarf virus (BYDV), the cereal yellow dwarf virus–RPV, filaree red leaf virus, maize leaf fleck virus, and rice giallume virus. It is also known to cause oat yellow leaf disease and the onion yellow dwarf virus.

== Natural enemies ==
A number of aphidophagous arthropods feed on R. padi and can reduce their population density. Because of R. padi's distribution at the base of cereal stems, generalist predators such as carabids and spiders can reduce their population density. In addition, more specialist predators include adults and larvae of Coccinellids, hoverfly larvae and lacewing larvae, as well as adult parasitoid wasps in the subfamily Aphidiinae.
