= Sugarcane mosaic disease =

Viral plant infection

Sugarcane mosaic disease is an agriculturally/economically significant pathogenic plant infection caused by sugarcane mosaic virus (SCMV), sorghum mosaic virus (SrMV), sugarcane streak mosaic virus (SCSMV), or any combination of the three. The disease savaged the North American/Caribbean sugar industry in the 1920s. The introduction (circa 1927) and propagation of Indonesian strains of sugar cane called Profestation of Java 213 and POJ 36 saved the business of sugar culture in Louisiana.
