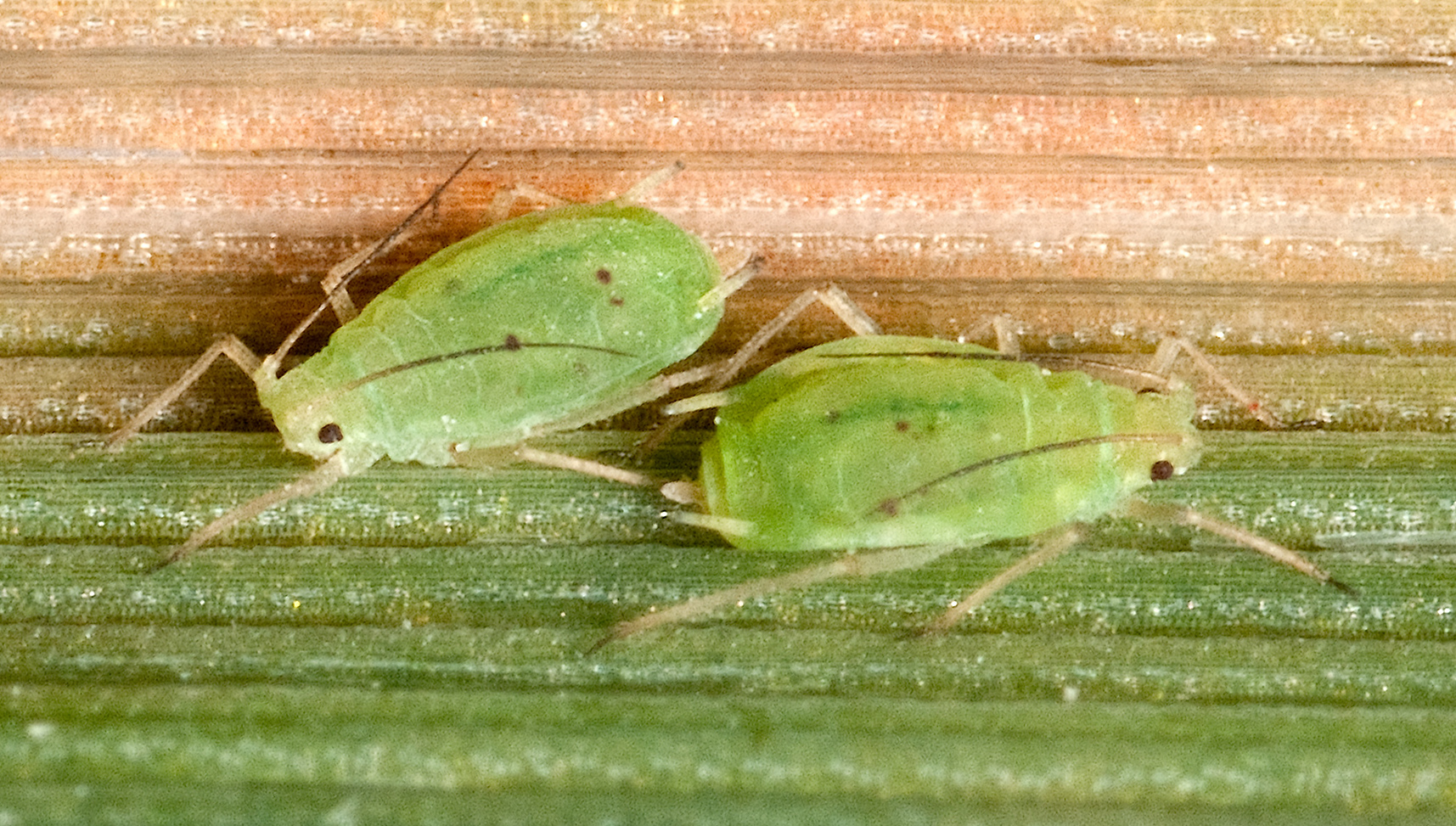

Scientific classification
- Kingdom: Animalia
- Phylum: Arthropoda
- Clade: Pancrustacea
- Class: Insecta
- Order: Hemiptera
- Suborder: Sternorrhyncha
- Family: Aphididae
- Tribe: Aphidini
- Subtribe: Rhopalosiphina
- Genus: Schizaphis
- Species: S. graminum

Binomial name
- Schizaphis graminum (Rondani, 1852)

Synonyms
- Aphis graminum Rondani, 1852; Toxoptera graminum

= Schizaphis graminum =

Species of true bug

The greenbug, or wheat aphid (Schizaphis graminum), is an aphid in the superfamily Aphidoidea in the order Hemiptera. It is a true bug and feeds on the leaves of Gramineae (grass) family members.

Its original distribution is the Palaearctic, but it has been introduced to other parts of the world. It is one of about 40 recognized Schizaphis species worldwide.

== Description ==
Adult greenbugs are 1.3 to 2.1 mm (0.05 to 0.08 in) long. The head and thorax are straw-colored to pale green and the abdomen is mid-green, with a dark green dorsal stripe in late-stage nymphs and adults. The antennae are dark and the cornicles are pale with dark tips. Early in the season the adults are wingless, but under conditions of over-crowding, winged forms appear and migrate to neighbouring plants.

== Host plants ==
This aphid feeds almost exclusively on a range of grasses in the family Poaceae; genera attacked include Agropyron, Avena, Bromus, Dactylis, Eleusine, Festuca, Hordeum, Lolium, Oryza, Panicum, Poa, Sorghum, Triticum and Zea. It has been reported as a pest of the pearl millet in Pakistan.

== Ecology ==
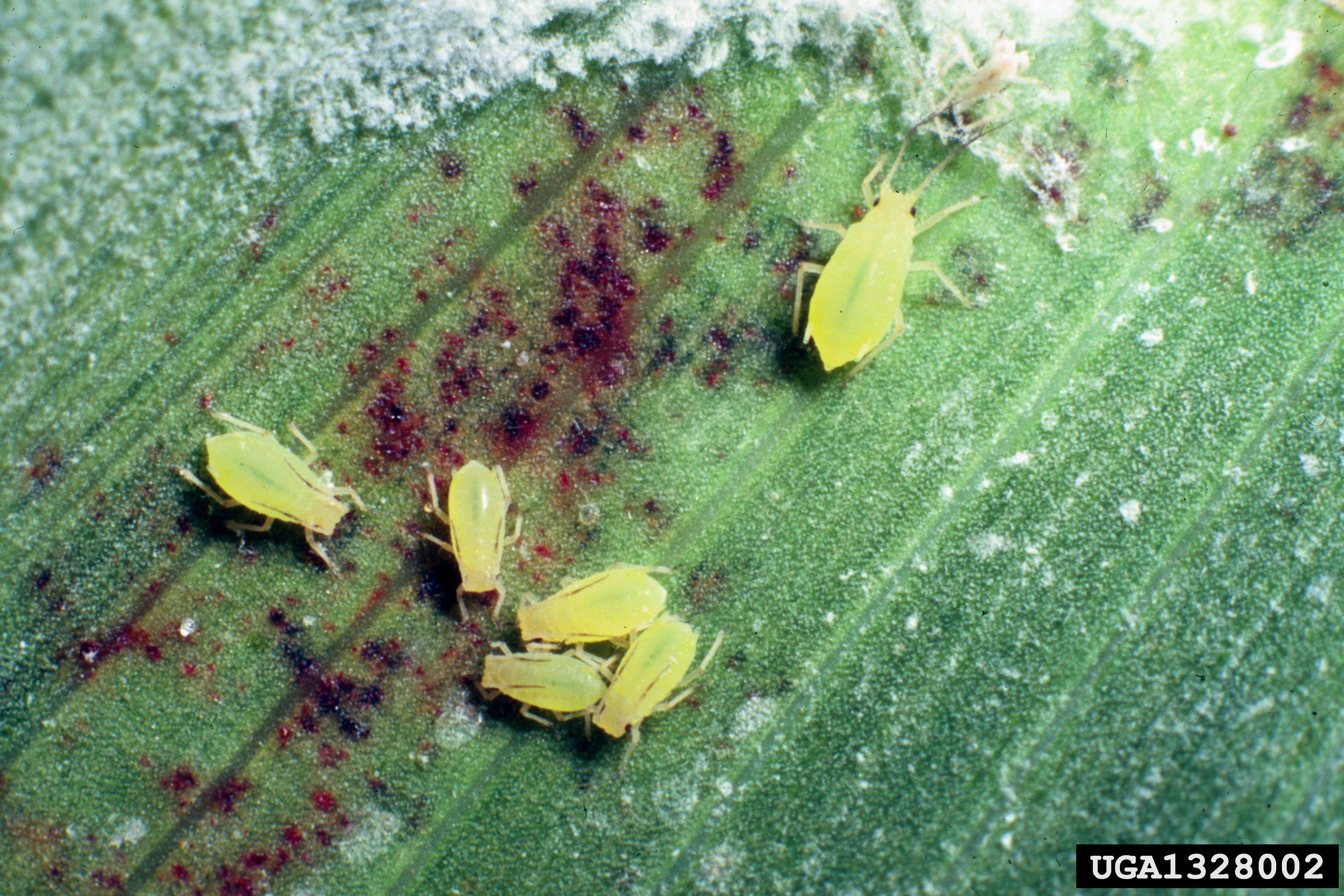
Adults infesting Sorghum bicolor

In warm or moderate climates, the greenbug reproduces by parthenogenesis, female insects producing nymphs at the rate of up to five per day on paspalum near the Florida coast. There are three instar stages and a generation length of seven to nine days at 60 to 80 °F (16 to 27 °C). In cooler climates, females mate in the autumn with winged males, and the eggs overwinter on such grasses as Poa pratensis. Within the Post-Soviet states there can be up to fifteen generations in the year and the most favourable temperature is around 20 °C (68 °F) for wingless forms, and 27 °C (81 °F) for winged ones.

When feeding on grasses, the aphids suck the sap and at first cause yellow or red spots on the leaves. As the greenbugs become more numerous, the plant progressively develop yellow and red hues, leaves die, roots die and in extreme cases, the whole plant succumbs. On susceptible cultivars of small grain crops, the plant size and yield are affected. In turf grass, the tips and blades of the leaves turn yellow with brown tips, which contrasts strongly with healthy leaves. As the leaves die back, the aphids move on to fresh foliage.

The greenbug is the vector of several plant viruses including barley yellow dwarf virus, sugarcane mosaic virus, maize dwarf mosaic virus and millet red leaf virus.
