= Schizaphis rotundiventris =

Scientific classification
- Domain: Eukaryota
- Kingdom: Animalia
- Phylum: Arthropoda
- Class: Insecta
- Order: Hemiptera
- Suborder: Sternorrhyncha
- Family: Aphididae
- Subfamily: Aphidinae
- Tribe: Aphidini
- Subtribe: Rhopalosiphina
- Genus: Schizaphis
- Species: S. rotundiventris

Binomial name
- Schizaphis rotundiventris (Signoret, 1860)

Synonyms
- Acaudus calami Theobald, 1923; Aphis acori Theobald, 1923; Rhopalosiphon punjabipyri (Das, 1918); Schizaphis cyperi (van der Goot, 1917); Schizaphis punjabipyri (Das & B.C., 1918); Schizoneura rotundiventris Signoret, 1860; Toxoptera cyperi van der Goot, 1917; Toxoptera punjabipyri Das, 1918; Toxoptera rotundiventris

Species of true bug

Schizaphis rotundiventris, the Oil palm aphid, is a species of aphid in the family Aphididae. It is native to the Northern India, Nepal, and Pakistan, and adventive to southern Europe, Asia, Oceania, Africa, and the Americas. The host plants for this aphid include pear trees (Pyrus), sedges (Cyperaceae), and, as its common name suggests, Oil Palms (Elaeis guineensis).

This aphid, as with other aphids, is not a member of the order Heteroptera so is not considered a "true bug". It feeds on green leaves and stems of its host plants.
