= 4-Hydroxy-7-methoxy-3-oxo-3,4-dihydro-2H-1,4-benzoxazin-2-yl glucoside beta-D-glucosidase =

Class of enzymes

Identifiers
- EC no.: 3.2.1.182

Databases
- BRENDA: enzyme data
- ExPASy: NiceZyme view
- KEGG: enzyme entry
- MetaCyc: metabolic pathway
- Rhea: reactions
- PDB structures: RCSB PDB PDBe PDBsum
Search
- PMC: articles
- PubMed: articles
- NCBI: proteins

4-Hydroxy-7-methoxy-3-oxo-3,4-dihydro-2H-1,4-benzoxazin-2-yl glucoside beta-D-glucosidase (EC 3.2.1.182, DIMBOAGlc hydrolase, DIMBOA glucosidase) is an enzyme with systematic name (2R)-4-hydroxy-7-methoxy-3-oxo-3,4-dihydro-2H-1,4-benzoxazin-2-yl beta-D-glucopyranoside beta-D-glucosidase. It catalyses two related chemical reactions which remove a glucoside unit from the hydroxamic acids, DIBOA glucoside and DIMBOA glucoside to give DIBOA (2,4-dihydroxy-1,4-benzoxazinone) and its methoxy derivative DIMBOA:

DIBOA glucoside
H_{2}O
DIBOA
+
D-glucose
DIMBOA glucoside
H_{2}O
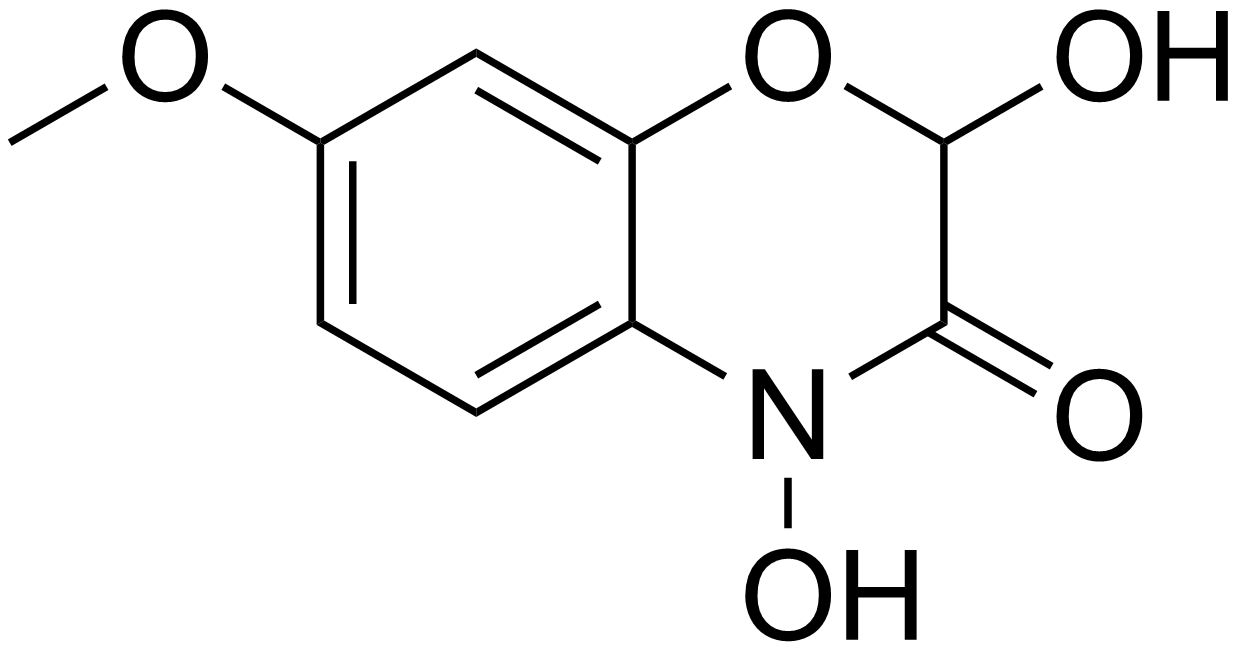
DIMBOA
+ D-glucose

DIBOA and DIMBOA are natural plant defense compounds found in cereals including wheat, rye, and maize. They are stored in the plant as these inactive glucosides until released in response, for example, to attack by insects. The enzyme from Triticum aestivum has a higher affinity for DIMBOA glucoside than DIBOA glucoside but Secale cereale shows the reverse selectivity.
