= 2-Hydroxy-1,4-benzoxazin-3-one monooxygenase =

Class of enzymes

Identifiers
- EC no.: 1.14.14.110

Databases
- IntEnz: IntEnz view
- BRENDA: BRENDA entry
- ExPASy: NiceZyme view
- KEGG: KEGG entry
- MetaCyc: metabolic pathway
- PRIAM: profile
- PDB structures: RCSB PDB PDBe PDBsum
Search
- PMC: articles
- PubMed: articles
- NCBI: proteins

2-Hydroxy-1,4-benzoxazin-3-one monooxygenase (EC 1.14.14.110, BX5 (gene), CYP71C3 (gene)) is an enzyme with systematic name 2-hydroxy-2H-1,4-benzoxazin-3(4H)-one,NAD(P)H:oxygen oxidoreductase (N-hydroxylating). This enzyme catalyses the following chemical reaction

HBOA
O_{2}
H_{2}O
2,4-dihydroxy-1,4-benzoxazinone

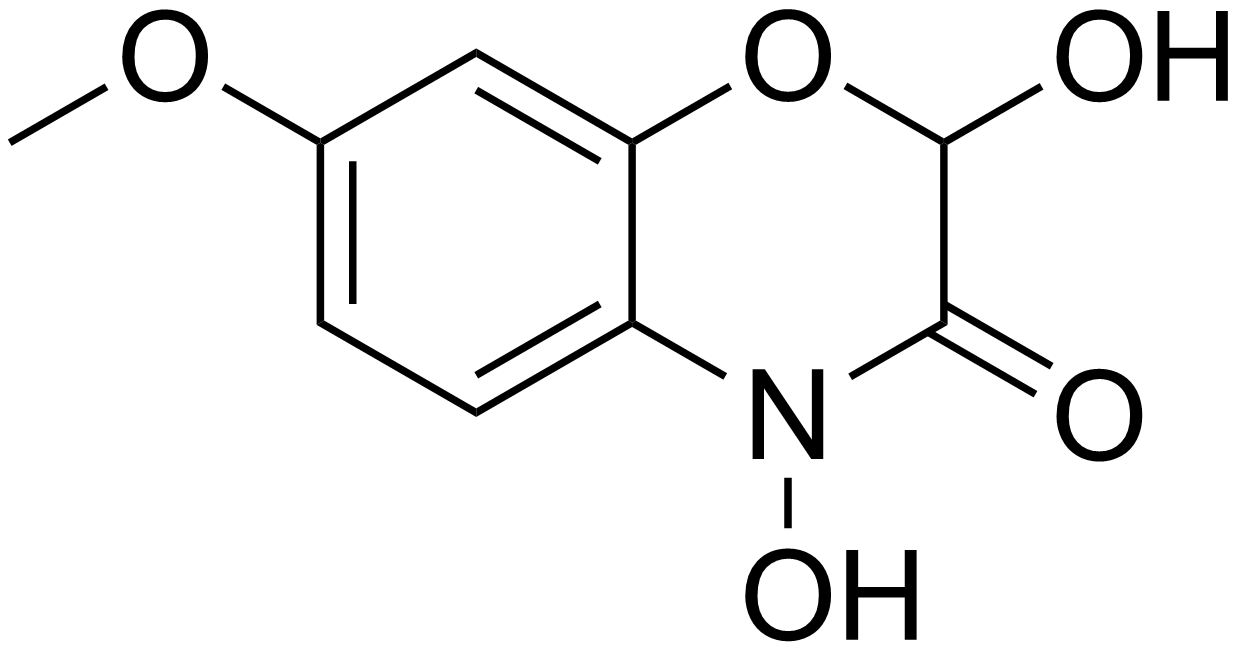
DIMBOA

The enzyme is a cytochrome P450 protein containing heme, isolated from maize and other grasses. It requires a partner cytochrome P450 reductase for functional expression. This uses nicotinamide adenine dinucleotide phosphate. It is involved in the biosynthesis of protective and allelopathic compounds such as DIMBOA in some plants.
