= 2,4,7-trihydroxy-1,4-benzoxazin-3-one-glucoside 7-O-methyltransferase =

Class of enzymes

Identifiers
- EC no.: 2.1.1.241

Databases
- IntEnz: IntEnz view
- BRENDA: BRENDA entry
- ExPASy: NiceZyme view
- KEGG: KEGG entry
- MetaCyc: metabolic pathway
- PRIAM: profile
- PDB structures: RCSB PDB PDBe PDBsum
Search
- PMC: articles
- PubMed: articles
- NCBI: proteins

2,4,7-trihydroxy-1,4-benzoxazin-3-one-glucoside 7-O-methyltransferase (EC 2.1.1.241, BX7 (gene), OMT BX7) is an enzyme with systematic name S-adenosyl-L-methionine:(2R)-4,7-dihydroxy-3-oxo-3,4-dihydro-2H-1,4-benzoxazin-2-yl β-D-glucopyranoside 7-O-methyltransferase. This enzyme catalyses the following chemical reaction

S-adenosyl-L-methionine + (2R)-4,7-dihydroxy-3-oxo-3,4-dihydro-2H-1,4-benzoxazin-2-yl β-D-glucopyranoside $\rightleftharpoons$ S-adenosyl-L-homocysteine + (2R)-4-hydroxy-7-methoxy-3-oxo-3,4-dihydro-2H-1,4-benzoxazin-2-yl β-D-glucopyranoside

The enzyme is involved in the biosynthesis of the protective and allelopathic glucoside of the benzoxazinoid, DIMBOA, e.g. from the family Poaceae (grasses).
