= IGL =

IGL may refer to:

- IGL@, a region on the q arm of human chromosome 22
- Indole-3-glycerol-phosphate lyase, an enzyme
- The IATA code for Çiğli Air Base, a military airport
- Indoor Gridiron League, American football league
- Igala language (ISO 639-3 code)
- India's Got Latent, an Indian stand-up comedy show
- Islamic Group of Lebanon
