= Schizaphis minuta =

Scientific classification
- Kingdom: Animalia
- Phylum: Arthropoda
- Class: Insecta
- Order: Hemiptera
- Suborder: Sternorrhyncha
- Family: Aphididae
- Tribe: Aphidini
- Subtribe: Rhopalosiphina
- Genus: Schizaphis
- Species: S. minuta

Binomial name
- Schizaphis minuta (van der Goot, 1917)

Synonyms
- Toxoptera minuta van der Goot, 1917

Species of true bug

Schizaphis minuta, also known as Schizaphis (Schizaphis) minuta, is an aphid in the superfamily Aphidoidea in the order Hemiptera. It was originally found from tropical Asian countries, but discovered from United States recently.
