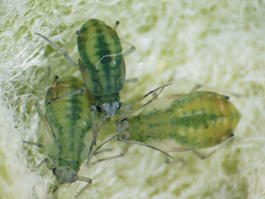

Scientific classification
- Kingdom: Animalia
- Phylum: Arthropoda
- Clade: Pancrustacea
- Class: Insecta
- Order: Hemiptera
- Suborder: Sternorrhyncha
- Family: Aphididae
- Genus: Rhopalosiphum
- Species: R. oxyacanthae

Binomial name
- Rhopalosiphum oxyacanthae (Schrank, 1801)

Synonyms
- List: Aphis bivincta Fitch, 1855; Aphis crataegella; Aphis crataegi (Monell, 1879); Aphis edentula Buckton, 1879; Aphis fitchii Sanderson, 1902; Aphis fulviventris Fitch, 1855; Aphis immaculata Fitch, 1855; Aphis inserta Walker, 1849; Aphis macatata (Walker, 1849); Aphis mactata Walker, 1849; Aphis mali subsp. bivincta Fitch, 1855; Aphis mali subsp. fulviventris Fitch, 1855; Aphis mali subsp. immaculata Fitch, 1855; Aphis mali subsp. nigricollis Fitch, 1855; Aphis mali subsp. nigriventris Fitch, 1855; Aphis mali subsp. obsoleta Fitch, 1855; Aphis mali subsp. pallidicornis Fitch, 1855; Aphis mali subsp. tergata Fitch, 1855; Aphis mali subsp. thoracica Fitch, 1855; Aphis mali subsp. triseriata Fitch, 1855; Aphis nigricollis Fitch, 1855; Aphis nigriventris Fitch, 1855; Aphis obsoleta Fitch, 1855; Aphis oxyacanthae Schrank, 1801; Aphis pallidicornis Fitch, 1855; Aphis tergata Fitch, 1855; Aphis thoracica Fitch, 1855; Aphis triseriata Fitch, 1855; Doralis crataegaria (Buckton, 1879); Doralis pomi (De Geer, 1773); Myzus oxyacanthae (Schrank, 1801); Oxyacanthaphis oxyacanthae (Schrank, 1801); Rhopalosiphon crataegellus; Rhopalosiphon inserta (Walker, 1849); Rhopalosiphon oxyacanthae (Schrank, 1801); Rhopalosiphum crataegella; Rhopalosiphum viridis Richards, 1960; Siphonaphis fitchii (Sanderson, 1902)

= Rhopalosiphum oxyacanthae =

Species of aphid

Rhopalosiphum oxyacanthae, commonly known as the apple-grass aphid (and sometimes referred to as the apple-grain aphid) is a species of aphid in the phylum Arthropoda. This species is considered a pest in agriculture and has a wide distribution around the world. These aphids can be commonly found on the fruits of apples and other such species. They can be found in a wide range around the world including England and New Zealand.

== Description ==
Young R. oxyacanthae can be distinguished from other aphids by the dark green stripe along their body and their rear cornicles. As they age, aphids will become a lighter green while maintaining the dark green stripe. Adults can have wings or remain wingless. R. oxyacanthae range in size from 1.0 to 1.6 mm in length

== Life cycle ==
These aphids follow the general life cycle of most other aphid species. First generation females can lay around 100 eggs. Eggs of R. oxyacanthae will appear small, oval and shiny. The eggs are green but are difficult to differentiate between other species of aphid eggs. Eggs are laid on branches and will typically hatch before other aphid species.

As a nymph, R. oxyacanthae appears dark green with short cornicles at the end of its abdomen. The nymphs will feed on the leaves of the host, and on the flower buds. Aphids will alternate hosts as they develop. Nymphs can be sensitive to colder spring temperatures.

Adults experience several different generations, one wingless and one winged. As wingless females mature, they can produce offspring without fertilization. Adults that develop wings, the second generation, will migrate to other hosts such as grasses in mid-May. The second generation of aphids that do not develop wings will produce a third generation. Third generation aphids will all have wings and will migrate from the apple trees around late spring. In autumn, winged females return to the fruit trees and mate with winged males from the grasses. These females will lay overwintering eggs on twigs. R. oxyacanthae has a short adult life but a high reproductive rate.

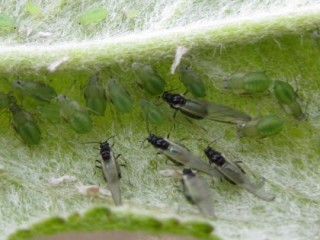
Male R. insertum with non-winged individuals.

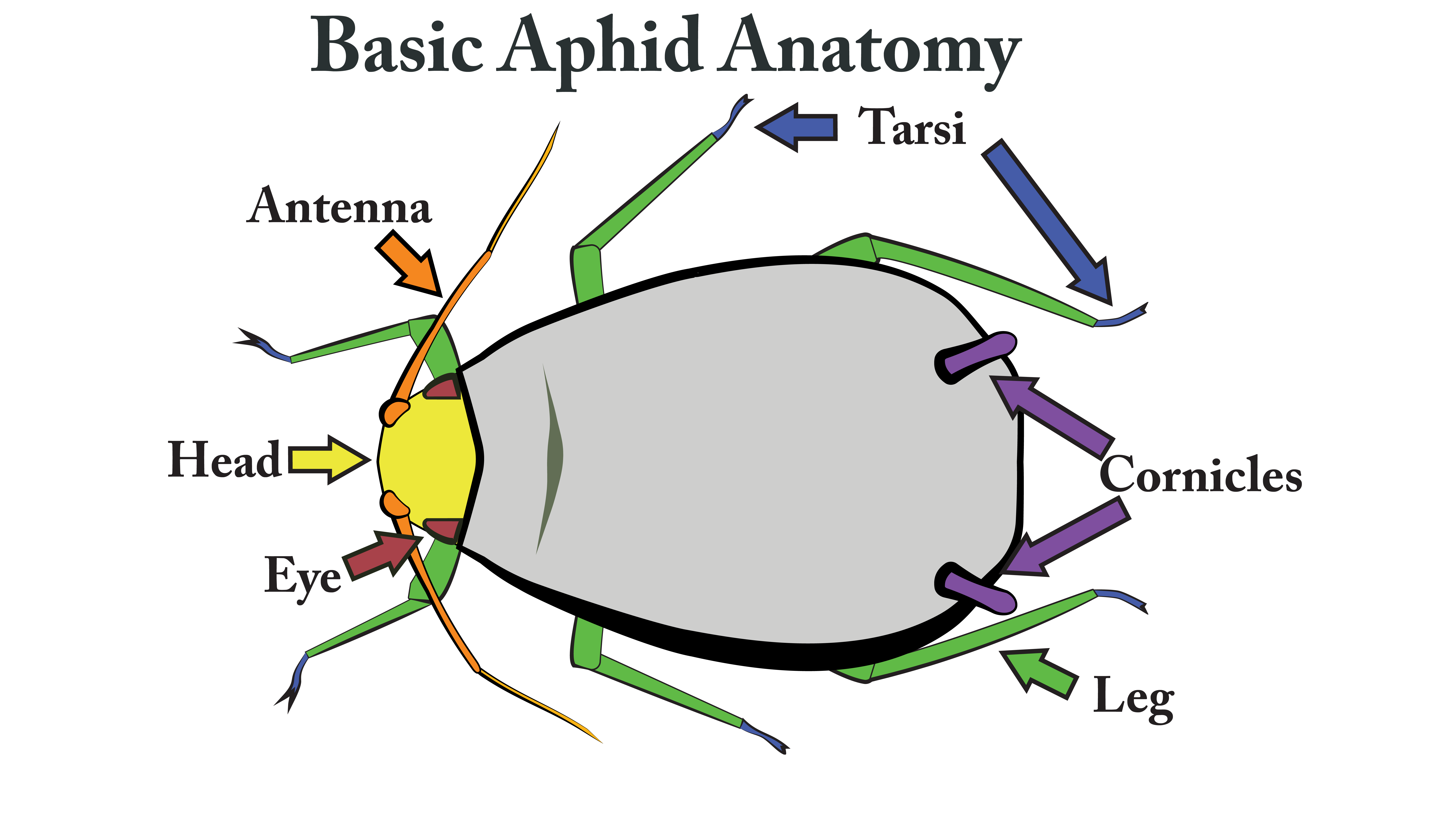
Basic anatomy of an aphid.

== Ecology ==
=== Evolution ===
Today, R. insertum has been reported widely in North America, the United Kingdom, New Zealand, and parts of Ireland. These aphids have adapted to have develop multiple morphs, a term called polyphenism, to deal with competition for plant resources. Humans have also pressured R. oxyacanthae into adaptations against pesticides and other methods to cease their infestations.

=== Hosts ===
Rhopalosiphum oxyacanthae feeds on many different types of plants: grains, grasses, apples, pears, quince, and other similar plants. They can affect plants in the Poaceae and Rosaceae families. The effects of an infestation can be visible on leaves in early spring. Leaves will typically curl. Damage is typically minimal, unless there is a large population. Winged males will typically feed on the roots of grasses, while nymphs stay on leaves.

=== Predators ===
Large amounts of R. oxyacanthae will attract many predators to them. They are predated on by organisms such as Anystis baccarum (a predatory mite). This mite predates on R. oxyacanthae at all stages of life. These aphid are preyed upon by other insects. Aphids are also affected by parasites and can be used to suppress aphid numbers.

== Management ==
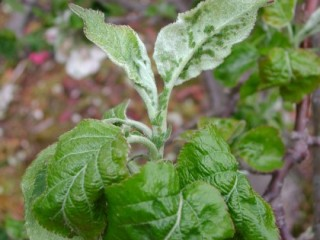
Example of R. oxyacanthae infestation and leaf curl on a young plant

While the damage can be very minimal in low populations, an infestation of R. oxyacanthae can affect crop production and lead to economic losses for humans. There are various ways humans have dealt with aphids such as using sticky traps and suction traps. Most forms of population control come in the form of pesticides and other chemicals. Due to the minimal effect these aphids have they usually are not in need of control. Some researchers argue that R. oxyacanthae can be even beneficial.
