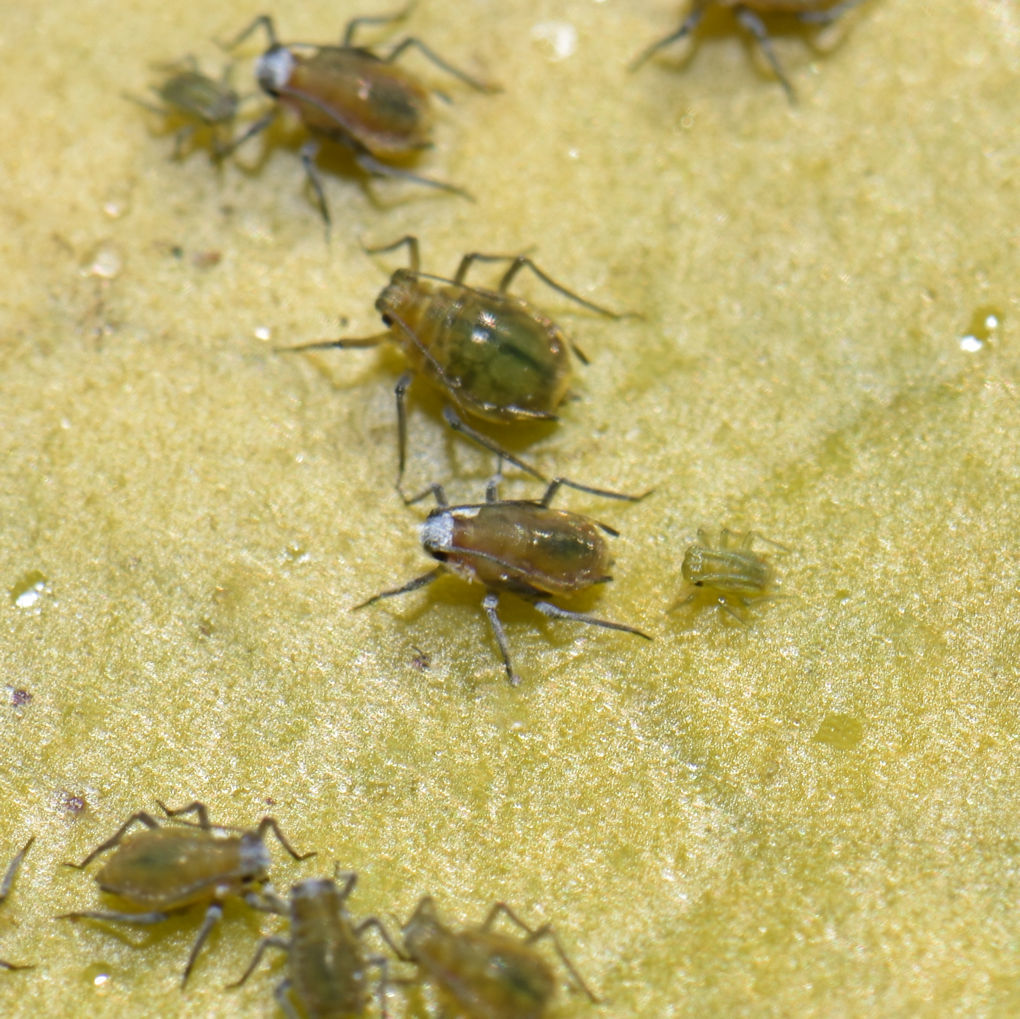

Scientific classification
- Kingdom: Animalia
- Phylum: Arthropoda
- Clade: Pancrustacea
- Class: Insecta
- Order: Hemiptera
- Suborder: Sternorrhyncha
- Family: Aphididae
- Genus: Rhopalosiphum
- Species: R. nymphaeae

Binomial name
- Rhopalosiphum nymphaeae (Linnaeus, 1761)

Synonyms
- Aphid nymphaeae Linnaeus, 1761

= Rhopalosiphum nymphaeae =

Species of true bug

Rhopalosiphum nymphaeae, the waterlily aphid, is a species of aphid in the family Aphididae. It is found in Europe.

== Appearance ==
Typical for an aphid.

== Life cycle ==
Six to eight generations a year with the eggs overwintering on shrubby plants.

== Pest ==
Water lily damage at high populations results in the leaves winding themselves up as emerging out of the water, and they become withered and faded.

=== Pest Control ===
Can be mechanical by removing the surface damaged water lilies to a nearby hard surface and heating under black plastic in the sun. Pesticides can be problematical.
