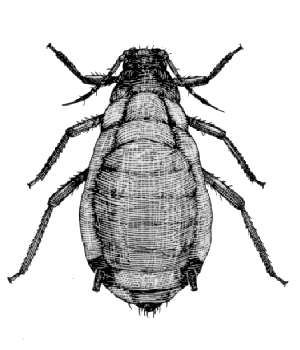
- R. maidis

Scientific classification
- Domain: Eukaryota
- Kingdom: Animalia
- Phylum: Arthropoda
- Class: Insecta
- Order: Hemiptera
- Suborder: Sternorrhyncha
- Family: Aphididae
- Subfamily: Aphidinae
- Tribe: Aphidini
- Genus: Rhopalosiphum; Koch, 1854

= Rhopalosiphum =

Genus of true bugs

Rhopalosiphum is a genus of aphid of the family Aphididae that includes 17 species worldwide. Apart from sucking the phloem of host plants and thereby being treated in agriculture as pests, some species are vectors for viral plant pathogens.

== Selected species ==
Species include:

- Rhopalosiphum cerasifoliae (Fitch, 1855)
- Rhopalosiphum chusqueae Pérez Hidalgo & Villalobos Muller, 2012
- Rhopalosiphum enigmae F. C. Hottes and T. H. Frison, 1931
- Rhopalosiphum maidis (Fitch, 1856) - corn leaf aphid
- Rhopalosiphum musae (Schouteden, 1906)
- Rhopalosiphum nigrum Richards, 1960
- Rhopalosiphum nymphaeae (Linnaeus, 1761) - water lily or plum aphid
- Rhopalosiphum oxyacanthae (Schrank, 1801) - apple-grass aphid
- Rhopalosiphum padi (Linnaeus, 1758) - bird cherry-oat aphid
- Rhopalosiphum padiformis Richards, 1962
- Rhopalosiphum parvae Hottes and Frison, 1931
- Rhopalosiphum rufiabdominale (Sasaki, 1899) - rice root aphid
- Rhopalosiphum rufulum Richards, 1960
