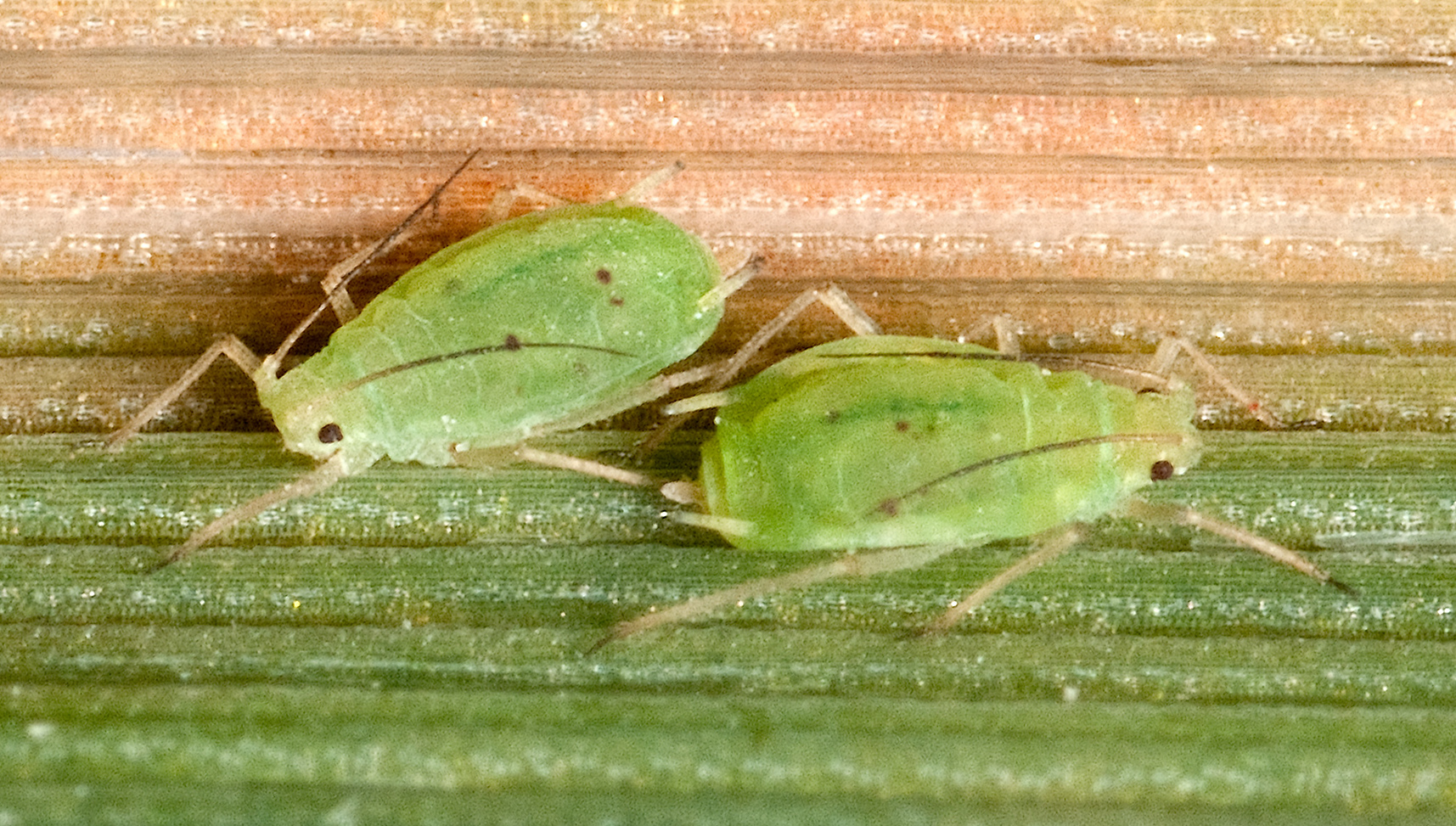
- Schizaphis graminum

Scientific classification
- Kingdom: Animalia
- Phylum: Arthropoda
- Clade: Pancrustacea
- Class: Insecta
- Order: Hemiptera
- Suborder: Sternorrhyncha
- Family: Aphididae
- Tribe: Aphidini
- Subtribe: Rhopalosiphina
- Genus: Schizaphis (Rondani, 1852)

= Schizaphis =

Genus of insects

Schizaphis is a genus of aphid in the family Aphididae superfamily Aphidoidea, order Hemiptera. Its original distribution is the Palaearctic, but some species have been introduced to other parts of the world. There more than 40 recognized Schizaphis species worldwide.

== Species ==
These 46 species belong to the genus Schizaphis:

- Schizaphis acori (Shinji, 1922)
- Schizaphis agrostis Hille Ris Lambers, 1947
- Schizaphis aurea Miyazaki, 1988
- Schizaphis borealis Tambs-Lyche, 1959
- Schizaphis brachytarsus (Takahashi, 1961)
- Schizaphis caricicola Pashtshenko, 1988
- Schizaphis caricis (Schouteden, 1906)
- Schizaphis chaenometicola Zhang, 1998
- Schizaphis cuprea Miyazaki, 1988
- Schizaphis dubia Huculak, 1968
- Schizaphis eastopi van Harten & Ilharco, 1971
- Schizaphis eriophori (F.P.Muller, 1974)
- Schizaphis glabra (Ilharco, 2002)
- Schizaphis gracilis Richards, 1963
- Schizaphis graminum (Rondani, 1852)
- Schizaphis hierochlophaga Zhang & Chen, 1998
- Schizaphis holci Hille Ris Lambers, 1947
- Schizaphis hypersiphonata Basu, 1970
- Schizaphis jaroslavi (Mordvilko, 1921)
- Schizaphis longicaudata Hille Ris Lambers, 1939
- Schizaphis longicornis (Richards, 1961)
- Schizaphis longisetosa (Higuchi, 1970)
- Schizaphis longituberclata Zhang & Qiao, 1998
- Schizaphis mali
- Schizaphis mehijiwae (Uye, 1924)
- Schizaphis minuta (van der Goot, 1917)
- Schizaphis muhlenbergiae (Phillips & Davis, 1912)
- Schizaphis nigerrima (Hille Ris Lambers, 1931)
- Schizaphis nigra (Baker, 1918)
- Schizaphis palustris (Theobald, 1929)
- Schizaphis pashtshenkoae (Ilharco, 2002)
- Schizaphis phlei Orlob, 1961
- Schizaphis pilipes (Ossiannilsson, 1959)
- Schizaphis piricola (Matsumura, 1917)
- Schizaphis priori Stroyan, 1960
- Schizaphis pyri Shaposhnikov, 1952
- Schizaphis rosazevedoi (Ilharco, 1961)
- Schizaphis rotundiventris (Signoret, 1860)
- Schizaphis rufula (Walker, 1849)
- Schizaphis scirpi (Passerini, 1874)
- Schizaphis scirpicola (Hille Ris Lambers, 1960)
- Schizaphis thunebergi Heie, 1986
- Schizaphis variegata Ossiannilsson, 1959
- Schizaphis wahlgreni (Ossiannilsson, 1959)
- Schizaphis weingaertneriae Hille Ris Lambers, 1947
- Schizaphis werderi Börner, 1950
