= 2,4-Dihydroxy-7-methoxy-2H-1,4-benzoxazin-3(4H)-one 2 -D-glucosyltransferase =

Class of enzymes

2,4-Dihydroxy-7-methoxy-2H-1,4-benzoxazin-3(4H)-one 2-D-glucosyltransferase

Identifiers
- EC no.: 2.4.1.202
- CAS no.: 122544-56-3

Databases
- IntEnz: IntEnz view
- BRENDA: BRENDA entry
- ExPASy: NiceZyme view
- KEGG: KEGG entry
- MetaCyc: metabolic pathway
- PRIAM: profile
- PDB structures: RCSB PDB PDBe PDBsum
Search
- PMC: articles
- PubMed: articles
- NCBI: proteins

2,4-Dihydroxy-7-methoxy-2H-1,4-benzoxazin-3(4H)-one 2-D-glucosyltransferase (EC 2.4.1.202, uridine diphosphoglucose-2,4-dihydroxy-7-methoxy-2H-1,4-benzoxazin-3(4H)-one 2-glucosyltransferase, BX8, BX9, benzoxazinoid glucosyltransferase, DIMBOA glucosyltransferase) is an enzyme with systematic name UDP-alpha-D-glucose:2,4-dihydroxy-7-methoxy-2H-1,4-benzoxazin-3(4H)-one 2-beta-D-glucosyltransferase. It catalyses two chemical reactions which allow plants such as maize to store toxic metabolites, DIBOA and DIMBOA as non-toxic glucosides.

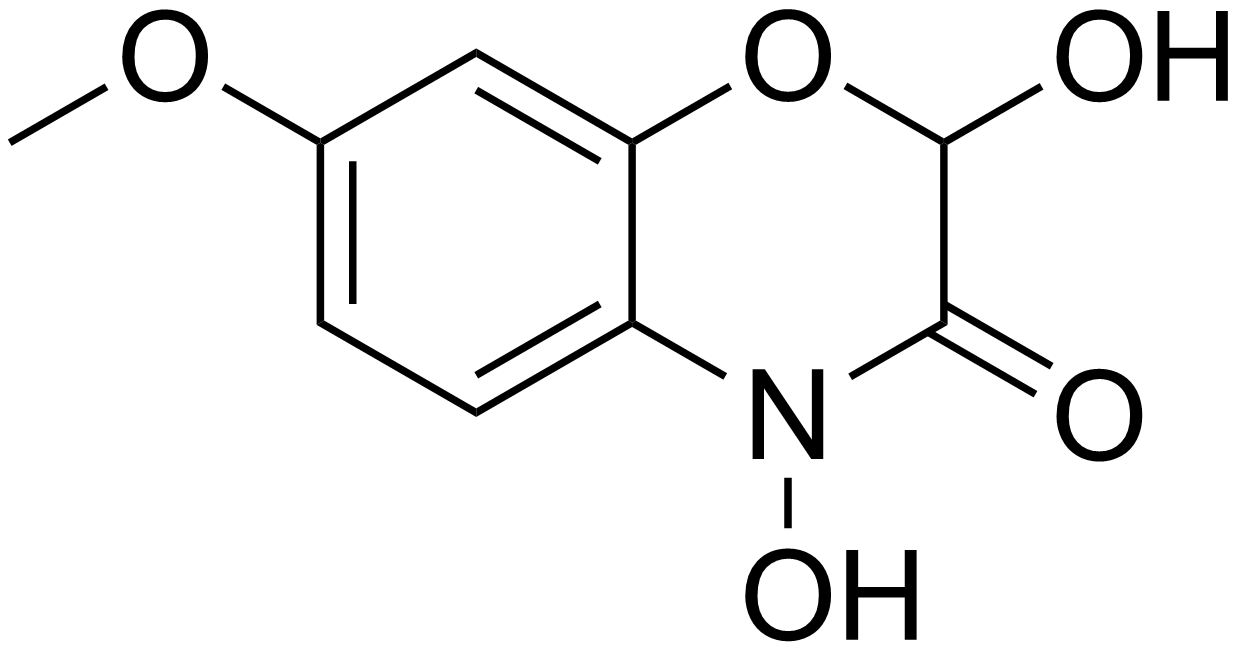
DIMBOA
+ UDP-glucose
UDP
UDP
DIMBOA glucoside

For example, the enzyme interconverts DIMBOA and the (2R) stereoisomer of its glucoside, using UDP-glucose to transfer the added sugar unit. In a similar way, the glucoside of DIBOA (a compound lacking the methoxy group of DIMBOA) is an alternative substrate:

DIBOA + UDP-glucose
UDP
UDP
DIBOA glucoside

The hydroxamic acids, DIMBOA and DIBOA are used to defend the plants in which they occur from pathogens.
