= Barley yellow dwarf virus 5'UTR =

Barley yellow dwarf virus 5' UTR
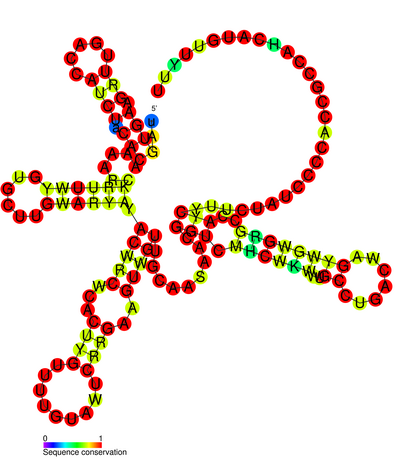
- Conserved secondary structure of BYDV 5' UTR.

Identifiers
- Symbol: BYDV 5'UTR
- Rfam: RF01508

Other data
- RNA type: cis-regulatory element
- Domain(s): barley yellow dwarf
- PDB structures: PDBe

Barley yellow dwarf virus 5' UTR is a non-coding RNA element containing structural elements required for translation of the genome of the plant disease pathogen Barley yellow dwarf virus.

Unlike eukaryotic mRNA, this virus lacks a 5' cap and a poly(A) tail but still circularises its mRNA through base pairing between two stem loops, one located in the 5' untranslated region (UTR) and the other within the 3' UTR. The structure within the 3' UTR has been previously characterised as the 3' cap-independent translation element (3' TE element) and the 5' UTR of barley yellow dwarf virus has been predicted to contain 4 stem loop structures. Mutagenesis showed that stem loop 4 is essential for base pairing with 3'TE and only 5 bases are needed to base pair for mRNA circularization to occur.
