= Viña San Pedro Airport =

Airport near Molina, Maule, Chile

- IATA: none; ICAO: SCMV

Summary
- Airport type: Private
- Serves: Molina, Chile
- Elevation AMSL: 738 ft / 225 m
- Coordinates: 35°06′25″S 71°19′45″W

Map
- Location of Viña San Pedro Airport in Chile

Runways
| Direction | Length | | Surface |
| Direction | m | ft | Surface |
|---|---|---|---|
| 03/21 | 700 | 2,297 | Grass |
- Source: Landings.com Google Maps GCM

Viña San Pedro Airport (Spanish: Aeropuerto Viña San Pedro), (ICAO: SCMV) is an airport 4 kilometres (2.5 mi) west of Molina, a city in the Maule Region of Chile.

The airport lies alongside the Pan-American Highway. There is distant high terrain to the west.

The Curico VOR-DME (Ident: ICO) is located 9.9 nautical miles (18.3 km) north-northeast of the airport.

== See also ==
- Transport in Chile
- List of airports in Chile
