= Toxopterina =

Scientific classification
- Domain: Eukaryota
- Kingdom: Animalia
- Phylum: Arthropoda
- Class: Insecta
- Order: Hemiptera
- Suborder: Sternorrhyncha
- Family: Aphididae
- Genus: Toxopterina; Börner, 1940

Genus of true bugs

Toxopterina is a genus of true bugs belonging to the family Aphididae.

The species of this genus are found in Europe.

Species:

- Toxopterina vandergooti (Börner, 1933)
