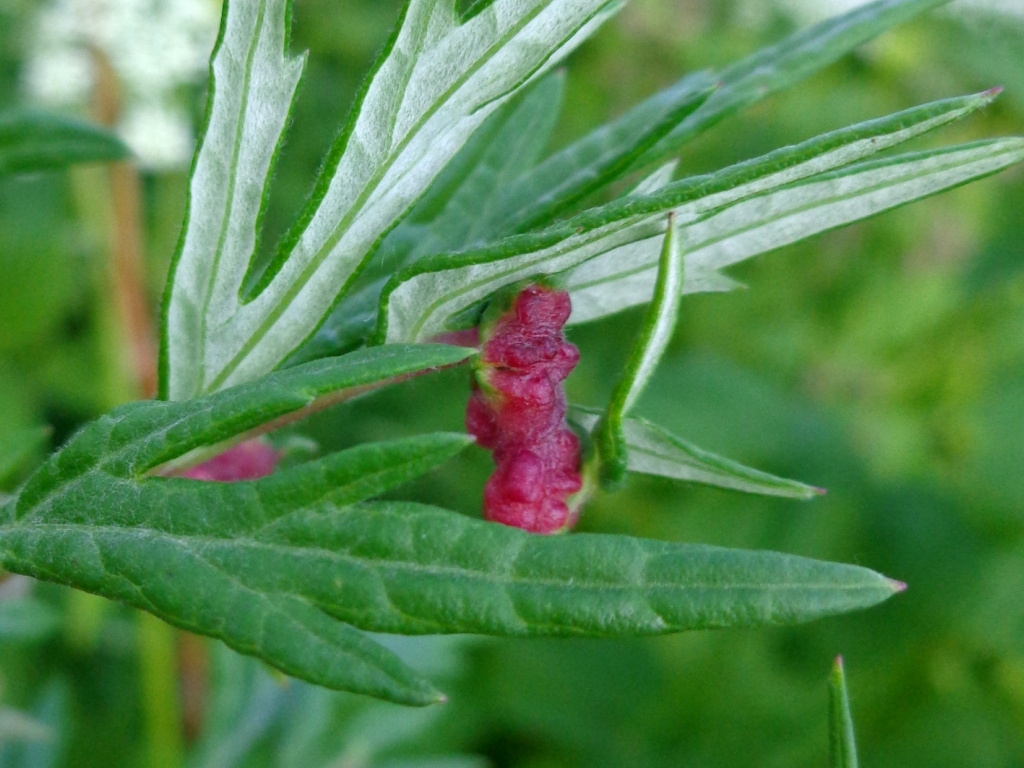
- Leaf galls caused by Cryptosiphum artemisiae

Scientific classification
- Domain: Eukaryota
- Kingdom: Animalia
- Phylum: Arthropoda
- Class: Insecta
- Order: Hemiptera
- Suborder: Sternorrhyncha
- Family: Aphididae
- Genus: Cryptosiphum; Buckton, 1879

Synonyms
- Cryptosiphon Börner, 1952; Cryptoziphum Buckton, 1879; Cryptoziphum Nevsky, 1929; Pseudolachnus Shinji, 1922

= Cryptosiphum =

Genus of true bugs

Cryptosiphum is a genus of true bugs belonging to the family Aphididae.

The species of this genus are found in Europe.

== Species ==
The following species are recognised in the genus Cryptosiphum:

- Cryptosiphum artemisiae Buckton, 1879
- Cryptosiphum astrachanicae Ivanovskaya, 1960
- Cryptosiphum atriplicivorum Zhang, Chen, Zhong & Li, 1999
- Cryptosiphum brevipilosum Börner, 1931
- Cryptosiphum dracunculum Kadyrbekov, 2002
- Cryptosiphum eurotiae Mamontova, 1968
- Cryptosiphum innokentyi Ivanovskaya, 1971
- Cryptosiphum linanense Zhang, 1980
- Cryptosiphum mordvilkoi Ivanovskaya, 1960
- Cryptosiphum sieversianae Ivanovskaya, 1958
- BOLD:AAV9082 (Cryptosiphum sp.)
