= Ac/Ds transposable controlling elements =

Transposable element system in maize

Ac/Ds transposable controlling elements was the first transposable element system recognized in maize. The Ac Activator element is autonomous, whereas the Ds Dissociation element requires an Activator element to transpose. Ac was initially discovered as enabling a Ds element to break chromosomes. Both Ac and Ds can also insert into genes, causing mutants that may revert to normal on excision of the element. The phenotypic consequence of Ac/Ds transposable element includes mosaic colors in kernels and leaves in maize.

== Discovery ==
Its discovery was based on studying its genetic behavior, i.e., "jumping genes" in maize and published by Barbara McClintock, leading to her 1983 Nobel Prize in Medicine. The Ac/Ds transposable elements were first isolated and sequenced By Fedoroff et al. 1983 using insertions of Ac and Ds into the well-studied Waxy(Wx1) gene. The elements have been shown to function in other plants, including tobacco, Arabidopsis,) and rice.

Genomic analysis of maize show that these elements, which share terminal 11 bp imperfect inverted repeat sequences, have much sequence heterogeneity, both in length and content. They also include a class of DNA elements that do not transpose in the presence of the Ac element (Du et al. 2011). The chromosome breaking property has been shown to come from pairs of closely positioned elements.

== Toolkits ==
Researchers use mutant phenotypes to discover gene functions. Ac/Ds prefer to transpose to nearby genes, affording a way to mutagenize those regions of the genome, and by subsequent genetic crosses, remove the Ac that causes new mutants and instability of a Ds mutant. Collections of Ac/Ds elements that cover the genome and are useful for generating mutants. Application of Ac/Ds toolkits has also been applied to other species like arabidopsis, yeast, and even zebrafish.

== In corn ==
Activator (Ac)/ Dissociation (Ds) transposable elements were discovered by Barbara McClintock when she was studying the maize genomic composition of the short arm of chromosome 9. She noticed that when chromosome 9 had been exposed to drastic structural modifications, the progeny had changes such as multiple copies of the short arm or lacking one or more of its parts, as well as other changes. She believed that these changes were due to transposition of “mutable loci” into the genome and that these spontaneous translocations were not random due to where the breaks occurred and where they fused.

Ac/Ds elements have been observed to insert into gene rich regions of the maize genome, they alter the regulation of gene expression and may create unstable insertion alleles, stable derivatives, or excision alleles due to insertion of a transposable element into a gene. Transposable elements residing at or near a gene prevent gene expression and can also result in a mutation that causes exhibition of the recessive phenotype. Removal of transposable element locus results in restoration of the gene organization and activity. Ac is 4565 base pairs long and codes for a 3.5 kb open reading frame that synthesizes an 807 amino acid long transposase enzyme. Ac elements are autonomous and their movement results in a 4.3 kb insertion. Ds elements are not autonomous because they cannot produce the transposase needed for transposition, and can only transpose when it is provided by the Ac element. Ds elements have shown to cause a 4.1kB and 2.0 kB insertions. The transposable elements were seen in progeny of plants that had undergone stress, and mutations caused by the insertion are like those caused by x-rays, UV light, or chemicals causing events like chromosome breakage and fusion.

There are distinct families of transposon controlling elements that are made up of a combination of elements some that can, and some that cannot, transpose. The families differ in their developmental timing and transposition frequency, as well other types of genetic rearrangements. Ac or Ds element insertion near a locus causes unstable mutations. Ds elements are considered non-autonomous because they cannot transpose without the presence of the Ac element, since they themselves cannot produce the enzyme transposase needed for transposition. However, since Ds elements can utilize the transposase enzyme produced by the Ac elements, it shows that they have the structural information needed for transposition and only lack the information needed to produce the enzyme. Ds elements were identified at the site of a chromosome breakage. Ac and Ds elements are structurally related because insertion of either element brings about similar mutations. They are also similar because their restriction endonuclease cleavage site maps are indistinguishable from each other.

Different mutants display different levels of gene expression, which largely depends on the presence or absence of the transposable element somewhere else in the genome. The different function of the elements are detected as altered temporal or spatial patterns of somatic reversions or reversible inactivation of the entire element. Some excision events of these elements restore gene function and can be detected as somatic reversions. If Ac or Ds insertions in an exon, and the transposable elements are excised leaving some of the duplicated base pairs behind, it alters the protein structure either by causing mutations such as frame shift mutations or the addition of amino acids. In some cases, unstable Ds or Ac induced mutant can give rise to a stable recessive mutant. Ac determines the mutation process and the mutable loci as well as their timing. Ac transposase does not influence transcription initiation site selection, and large numbers of Ac elements may inhibit the expression of Ds by reducing the rate of transcription initiation instead of affecting the transcription site selection. Ac transposase is also capable of suppressing gene expression when Ac or Ds inserts in 5’ untranslated region using target sites. Ac or Ds element insertion sites have been characterized by the presence of different direct duplications of 6-10 base pairs prior to insertions, indicating that Ac transposase may have preference for short duplication as insertion sites. Transposition of both Ac and Ds occurs during development of a tissue and is under precise control which is determined by the number of Ac loci present, their organization, and their position in the chromosome complement. The transposable elements not only entirely remove or alter the gene function via insertion, but can also exert a mutator activity when they leave the position where they had visited the chromosome. Induced disturbances in quantity and organization of the heterochromatic elements of the chromosome could give rise to a series of alterations in its structure, behavior, and in genic reactions that can alter phenotypic expression.

The Ac and Ds elements share two properties that are common for transposable elements. One is that at the site of their insertion, a short DNA sequence is 8 base pairs long, and is duplicated and borders exactly at the Ac or Ds sequence. Second, the sequences of several Ds elements terminate in an inverted repeat of the nucleotide sequence TAGGATGAAA. The Ds elements shows quite some degree of similarity with the Ac elements, such as the Ds9 element which is a complemental mutant of Ac and only differs in the open reading frame 1. Other Ds elements differ from the Ac element by internal deletions.

As Ac copy number increases, the expression of genes flanking the Ds promoter insertion are negatively regulated, which is called the negative dosage effect. Ds flanking gene expression is inhibited in the presence of the autonomous Ac element. As the Ac element copy number increases, transposition events that require Ac occur at a later time during endosperm development. Ac causes no or few chromosome breaks. In the absence of Ac, Ds caused mutations are stable. By identifying alleles that suppress the Ac element they could be used for functional genomics studies. The properties of transposable elements can also be altered in a clonally heritable fashion. Ds elements can be used as building blocks for complicated structures like the double Ds or the 30kb transposon-like insertion which is terminated by Ds elements. Ds elements can generate long direct inverted duplicates of a chromosome segment, indicating that Ds elements are able to mobilize DNA sequences unrelated to themselves, this can provide a mechanism for rearrangement of genetic information. Since small duplication of host DNA created by the insertion of the elements are left over in a slightly altered form after excision of the transposable element, they may indicate that plant transposable elements play a role in the evolution of genes.
