= Indole-3-glycerol-phosphate lyase =

Class of enzymes

Identifiers
- EC no.: 4.1.2.8

Databases
- IntEnz: IntEnz view
- BRENDA: BRENDA entry
- ExPASy: NiceZyme view
- KEGG: KEGG entry
- MetaCyc: metabolic pathway
- PRIAM: profile
- PDB structures: RCSB PDB PDBe PDBsum
Search
- PMC: articles
- PubMed: articles
- NCBI: proteins

The enzyme indole-3-glycerol-phosphate lyase (EC 4.1.2.8) catalyzes the chemical reaction

(1S,2R)-1-C-(indol-3-yl)glycerol 3-phosphate $\rightleftharpoons$ indole + D-glyceraldehyde 3-phosphate

This enzyme belongs to the family of lyases, specifically the aldehyde-lyases, which cleave carbon-carbon bonds. The systematic name of this enzyme class is (1S,2R)-1-C-(indol-3-yl)glycerol-3-phosphate D-glyceraldehyde-3-phosphate-lyase (indole-forming). Other names in common use include tryptophan synthase alpha, TSA, indoleglycerolphosphate aldolase, indole glycerol phosphate hydrolase, indole synthase, indole-3-glycerolphosphate D-glyceraldehyde-3-phosphate-lyase, indole-3-glycerol phosphate lyase, IGL, BX1, (1S,2R)-1-C-(indol-3-yl)glycerol 3-phosphate, and D-glyceraldehyde-3-phosphate-lyase. This enzyme participates in benzoxazinone biosynthesis.
