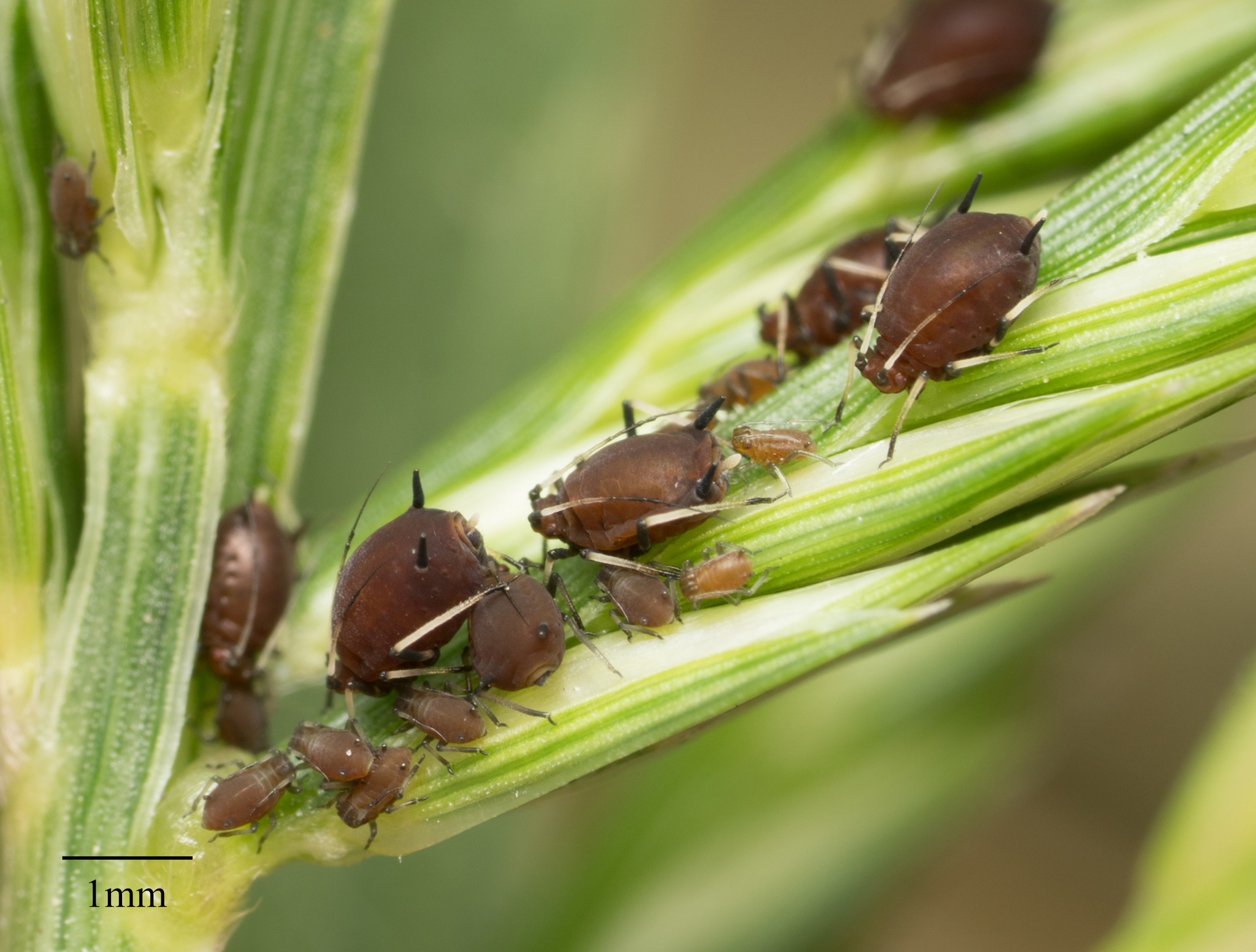
- Colony

Scientific classification
- Domain: Eukaryota
- Kingdom: Animalia
- Phylum: Arthropoda
- Class: Insecta
- Order: Hemiptera
- Suborder: Sternorrhyncha
- Family: Aphididae
- Subfamily: Aphidinae
- Tribe: Aphidini
- Subtribe: Rhopalosiphina
- Genus: Hysteroneura; Davis, 1919
- Species: H. setariae

Binomial name
- Hysteroneura setariae (Thomas, 1878)

= Hysteroneura =

Species of true bug

Hysteroneura setariae, the rusty plum aphid, is an aphid in the family Aphididae in the order Hemiptera. It is the only species in the genus Hysteroneura. It is a true bug and sucks sap from plants.

It is known from Yemen, and has also been recorded feeding on sorghum, other millets and rice in the United States.
