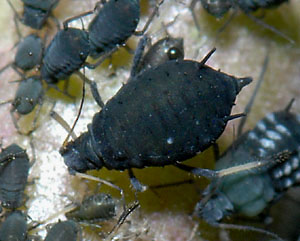
- Aphis armata

Scientific classification
- Domain: Eukaryota
- Kingdom: Animalia
- Phylum: Arthropoda
- Class: Insecta
- Order: Hemiptera
- Suborder: Sternorrhyncha
- Infraorder: Aphidomorpha
- Superfamily: Aphidoidea
- Family: Aphididae
- Subfamily: Aphidinae
- Tribe: Aphidini; Latreille, 1802

Genera
- See text

= Aphidini =

Tribe of true bugs

Aphidini is a tribe of true bugs in the subfamily Aphidinae.

== Genera ==
=== Subtribe: Aphidina ===
Aleurosiphon - Andinaphis - Anthemidaphis - Aphis - Brachyunguis - Braggia - Casimira - Chomaphis - Cryptosiphum - Eastopiella - Ephedraphis - Misturaphis - Nevadaphis - Paradoxaphis - Pehuenchaphis - Protaphis - Ryoichitakahashia - Sanbornia - Seneciobium - Siphonatrophia - Szelegiewicziella - Toxopterina - Xerobion -

=== Subtribe: Rhopalosiphina ===
Asiphonaphis - Hallaphis - Hyalopterus - Hysteroneura - Melanaphis - Mordvilkoiella - Pseudasiphonaphis - Pseudotoxoptera - Rhopalosiphum - Schizaphis - Swirskiaphis -
