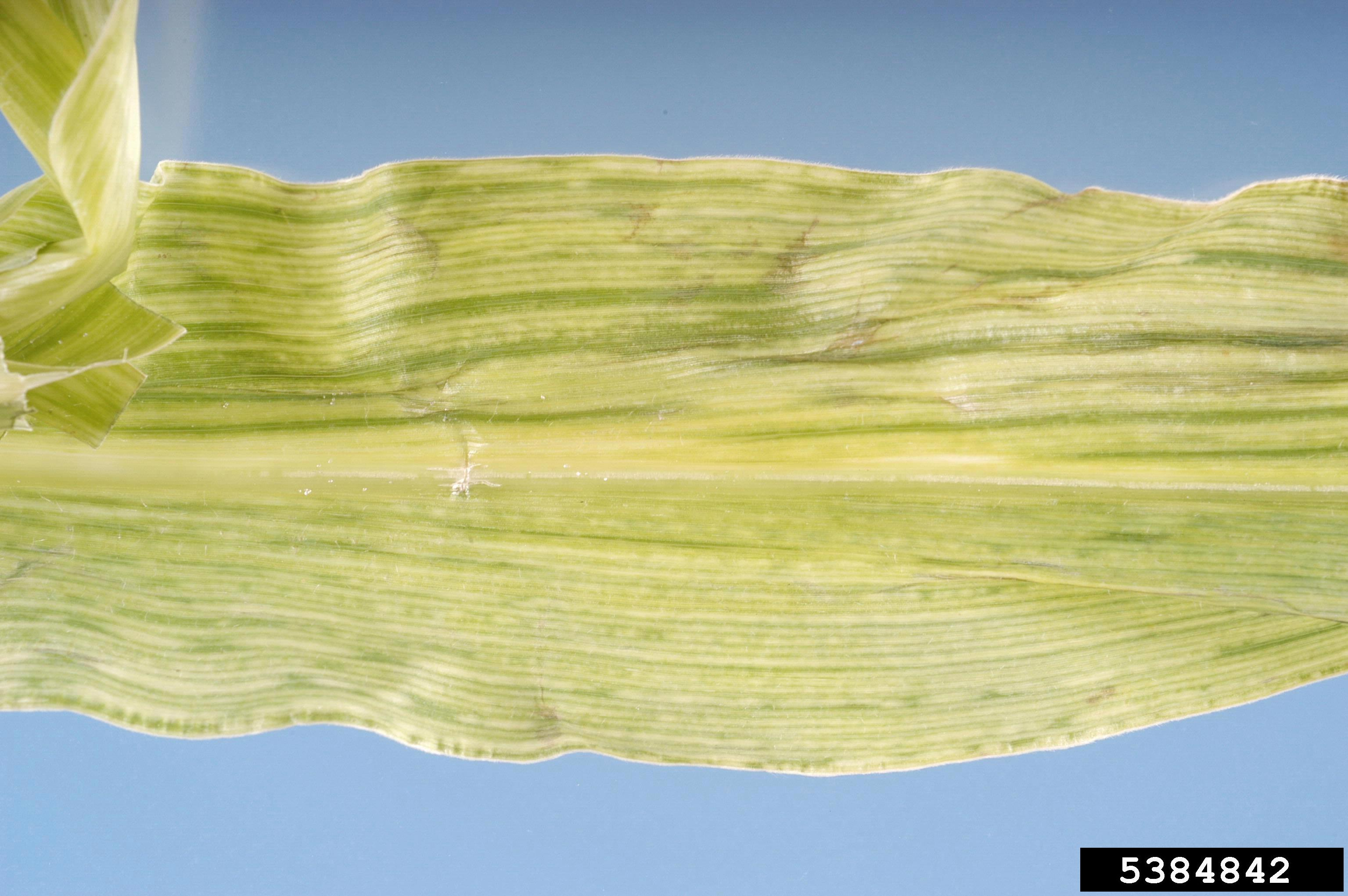
- Symptoms of Sugarcane mosaic virus

Virus classification
- (unranked): Virus
- Realm: Riboviria
- Kingdom: Orthornavirae
- Phylum: Pisuviricota
- Class: Stelpaviricetes
- Order: Patatavirales
- Family: Potyviridae
- Genus: Potyvirus
- Species: Potyvirus sacchari

Strains
- Abaca mosaic virus

Synonyms
- Grass mosaic virus; Maize dwarf mosaic virus strain B; Sorghum red stripe virus

= Sugarcane mosaic virus =

Species of virus

Sugarcane mosaic virus (SCMV) is a plant virus of the family Potyviridae. The virus was first noticed in Puerto Rico in 1916 and spread rapidly throughout the southern United States in the early 1920s. SCMV causes sugarcane mosaic disease, which is of great concern because of the high economic impact it has on sugarcane and maize.

== Hosts ==
Sugarcane mosaic virus causes mosaic symptoms in sugarcane, maize, sorghum, and other poaceous plants. In sugarcane, this is the most widespread virus and 21 strains of it have been found in the United States. The SCMV complex has been shown to consist of four distinct potyviruses and includes strains of Johnsongrass mosaic virus (JGMV), Maize dwarf mosaic virus (MDMV), Sorghum mosaic virus (SrMV), and SCMV.

== Vectors ==
The aphid Myzus persicae was first found to vector SCMV from sorghum to sorghum by Anzalone 1962.

== Symptoms ==
Symptoms of sugarcane mosaic virus include intense mottling throughout the laminar region of the plant, characterized by discoloration of the plants leaves, and growth stunting. In maize, the infection occurs first in the youngest leaves with symptoms such as irregular, light or dark green mosaic coloring developing along the veins. The virus can result in severe yield loss of the infected host and the disease eventually leads to necrosis. Diagnosis of sugarcane mosaic virus is achieved first through recognizing the typical light green mosaic pattern of the infection, electron microscopy of leaf dips, as well as virus isolation and purification methods. One diagnosis technique being studied is the next-generation sequencing method (NGS) or sap inoculation, which was found to have a 90% success rate in a 2011 study. NGS could allow quick assessment of disease and be used for routine diagnosis against potential disease-causing agents.

== Management ==
The disease is spread through sap containing the virus and can be transferred to other areas mostly by mechanical means such as lawn mowers and other equipment. To minimize spread of sugarcane mosaic virus all equipment used should be sanitized. Fungicides and other pesticides have been shown to be ineffective when dealing with viral disease. The best way to deal with a viral disease is through plant host resistance. The leading management tool has been to transform viral genes into maize plants, but transgenic plants have increasingly raised concerns for their potential negative ecological effects, such as reversal of silencing by viral suppressors, complementation, synergy, and gene flow among closely related organisms. Resistant strains have been utilized to control the virus in southern United States and tropical regions; however, these strains have not been able to be adapted in cooler conditions present in central and north-west Europe.

== Importance ==
The family Potyviridae causes significant losses in agricultural, pasture, horticultural and ornamental crops. Sugarcane mosaic virus is one of the largest and most economically important plant viruses due to its wide host range. In the mid-1920s, epidemics of the disease nearly collapsed the sugarcane industry in Argentina, Brazil, Cuba, and southern United States. In Australia, losses have been reported between SCMV causes major problems in most of the sugarcane growing countries and many varieties have gone out of cultivation due to yield losses of up to 50%. SCMV has also had a high incidence rate on maize being grown in China, the second largest maize producing country in the world. The virus, particularly maize dwarf mosaic disease caused by SCMV, has been among the most damaging diseases affecting maize production in China due to the large affect it has on yield. The high incidence of co-infection and the occurrence of new strains or genome variations indicate that SCMV will continue to be a threat to industry.
