= Barley yellow dwarf =

Barley yellow dwarf viruses

Scientific classification
- (unranked): Virus
- Realm: Riboviria
- Kingdom: Orthornavirae

Groups included
- Barley yellow dwarf virus GPV; Barley yellow dwarf virus kerII; Barley yellow dwarf virus kerIII; Barley yellow dwarf virus MAV; Barley yellow dwarf virus PAS; Barley yellow dwarf virus PAV; Barley yellow dwarf virus SGV

Viral disease of cereals

Barley yellow dwarf (BYD) is a plant disease caused by the barley yellow dwarf virus (BYDV), and is the most widely distributed viral disease of cereals. It affects the economically important crop species barley, oats, wheat, maize, triticale and rice.

== Virus ==
Barley yellow dwarf is caused by barley yellow dwarf viruses. They contain genomes made of ribonucleic acid (RNA). Seven species of barley yellow dwarf virus are recognized, classified as follows:

- Kingdom: Orthornavirae
  - Phylum: Kitrinoviricota
    - Class: Tolucaviricetes
      - Order: Tolivirales
        - Family: Tombusviridae
          - Genus: Luteovirus
            - Barley yellow dwarf virus kerII
            - Barley yellow dwarf virus kerIII
            - Barley yellow dwarf virus MAV
            - Barley yellow dwarf virus PAS
            - Barley yellow dwarf virus SGV
  - Phylum: Pisuviricota
    - Class: Pisoniviricetes
      - Order: Sobelivirales
        - Family: Solemoviridae
          - Genus: incertae sedis
            - Barley yellow dwarf virus GPV
            - Barley yellow dwarf virus SGV

== Pathology ==
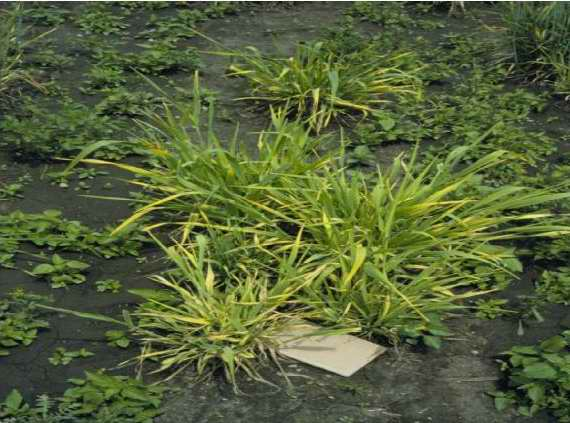
Wheat plants dwarfed after infection with BYDV.

When aphids feed on the phloem of the leaf, the virus is transmitted to the phloem cells. Once inside the plant, the virus begins to replicate and assemble new virions. This process requires significant metabolic input from the plant, and causes the symptoms of barley yellow dwarf disease.

The symptoms of barley yellow dwarf vary with the affected crop cultivar, the age of the plant at the time of infection, the strain of the virus, and environmental conditions, and can be confused with other disease or physiological disorders. Symptoms appear approximately 14 days after infection. Affected plants show a yellowing or reddening of leaves (on oats and some wheats), early maturity, stunting, partial sterility, an upright posture of thickened stiff leaves, reduced root growth, delayed (or no) heading, and a reduction in yield. The heads of affected plants tend to remain erect and become black and discoloured during ripening due to colonization by saprotrophic fungi. Young plants are the most susceptible.

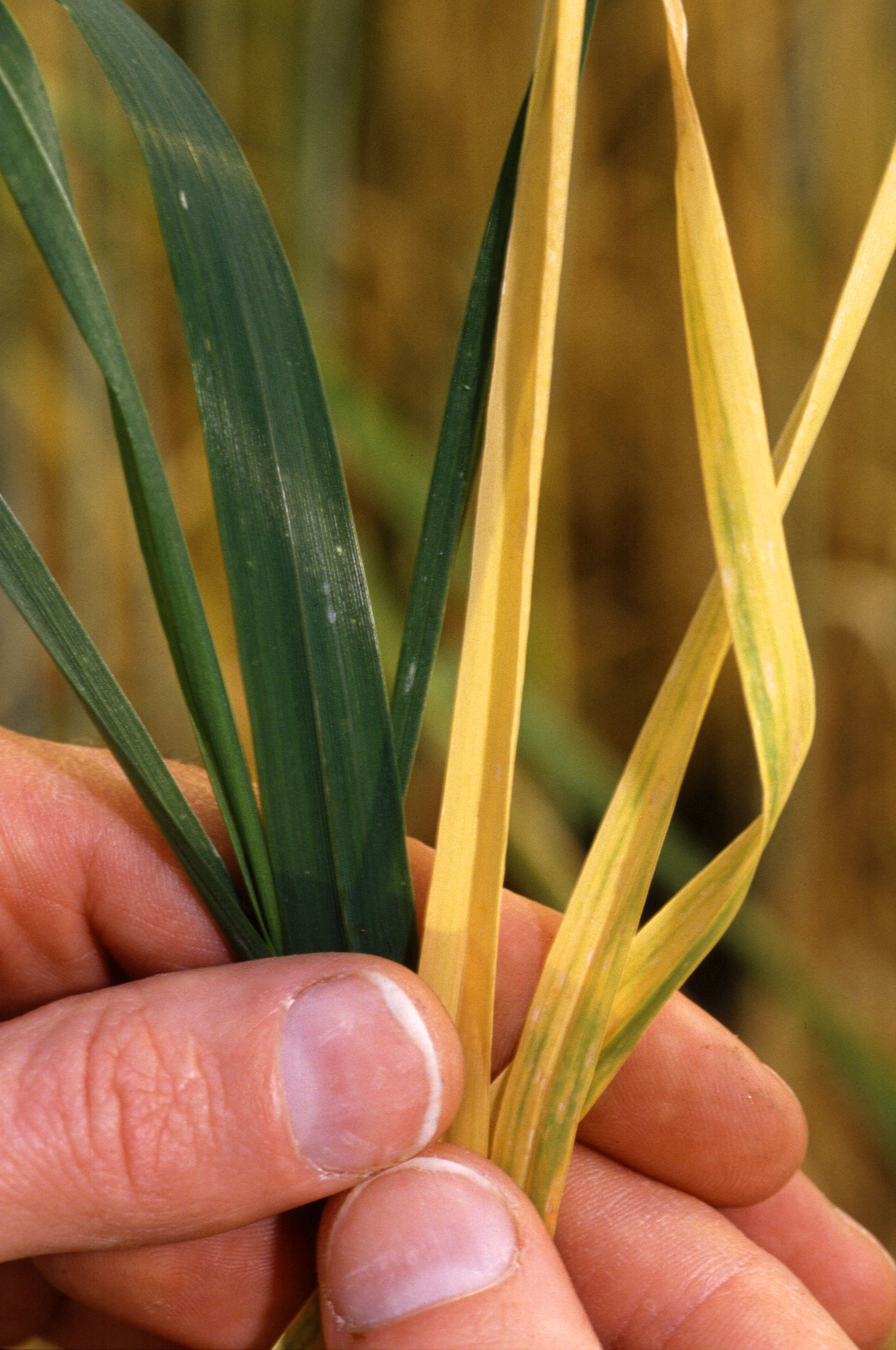
Infected wheat leaves have a reduced ability to photosynthesise.

The virus is transmitted from the phloem when the aphid feeds. When the aphid feeds, virions go to the aphid's hind gut, the coat protein of the virus is recognised by the hindgut epithelium, and the virion is allowed to pass into the insect's hemolymph, where it can remain indefinitely, but the virus cannot reproduce inside the aphid. The virus is actively transported into the accessory salivary gland to be released into salivary canals and ducts. The virus is then excreted in the aphid saliva during its next feeding.

The host range of BYDVs consists of more than 150 species in the Poaceae; a large number of grasses both annual and perennial are alternate hosts to BYVD and can serve as reservoirs of the virus.

== Sources and spread ==
There are two main sources by which a cereal crop might be infected

1. By non-migrant wingless aphids already present in the field and which colonise newly emerging crops. This is known as "green-bridge transfer".

2. By winged aphids migrating into crops from elsewhere. These then reproduce and the offspring spread to neighbouring plants.

One aphid species in particular, Rhopalosiphum rufiabdominale, known as the rice root aphid, is commonly known to vector the virus to a range of cereal crops.

== Effect on yield ==
This is variable since it depends on viral strain, time of infection and rate of spread. It can often cause losses equivalent to rusts. Most severe losses are from early infections and can be as high as 50%.

== Control ==
"Green bridge" sources must be ploughed in as early as possible. Alternatively, a desiccant herbicide should be applied 10 days prior to cultivation. Insecticide sprays may be used at crop emergence. However, aphid control is often not worthwhile. Genetically resistant varieties, even if moderate, are often sufficient.

Drilling dates prior to mid-October favors attacks from winged migrant aphids. However, yield penalties may be experienced from late drilling. Insecticide sprays in this instance are therefore aimed at killing the aphids before significant spread can occur.

== Products used ==
Synthetic pyrethroid insecticides
