= DIMBOA =

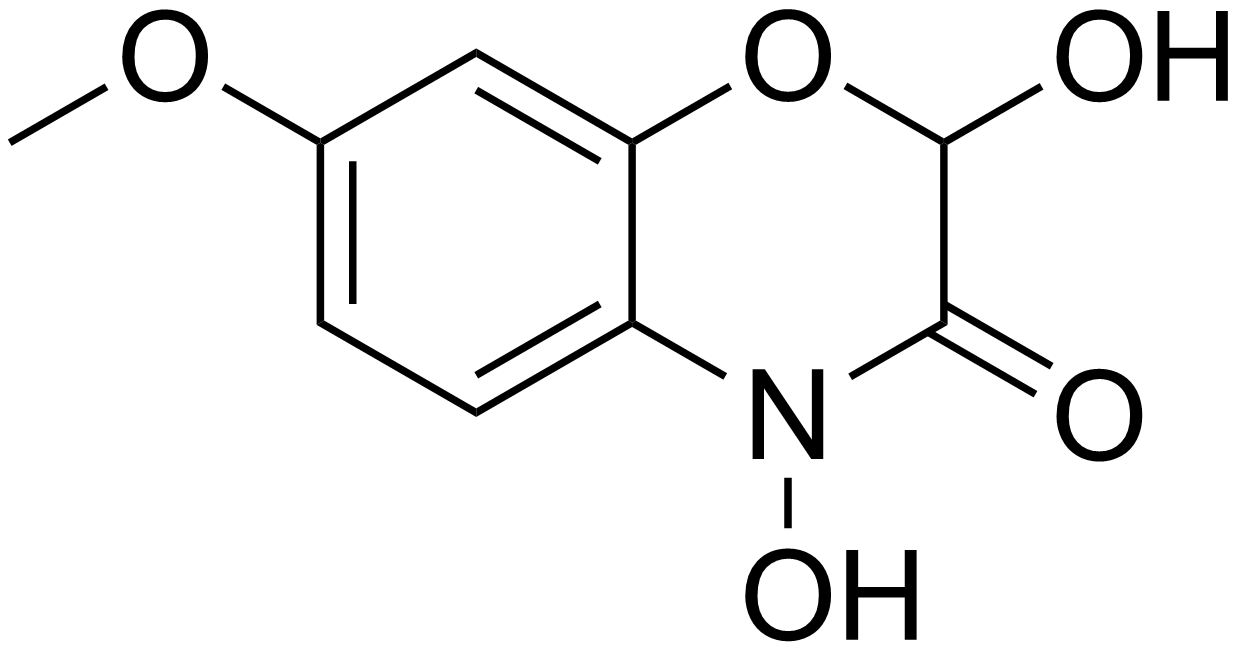

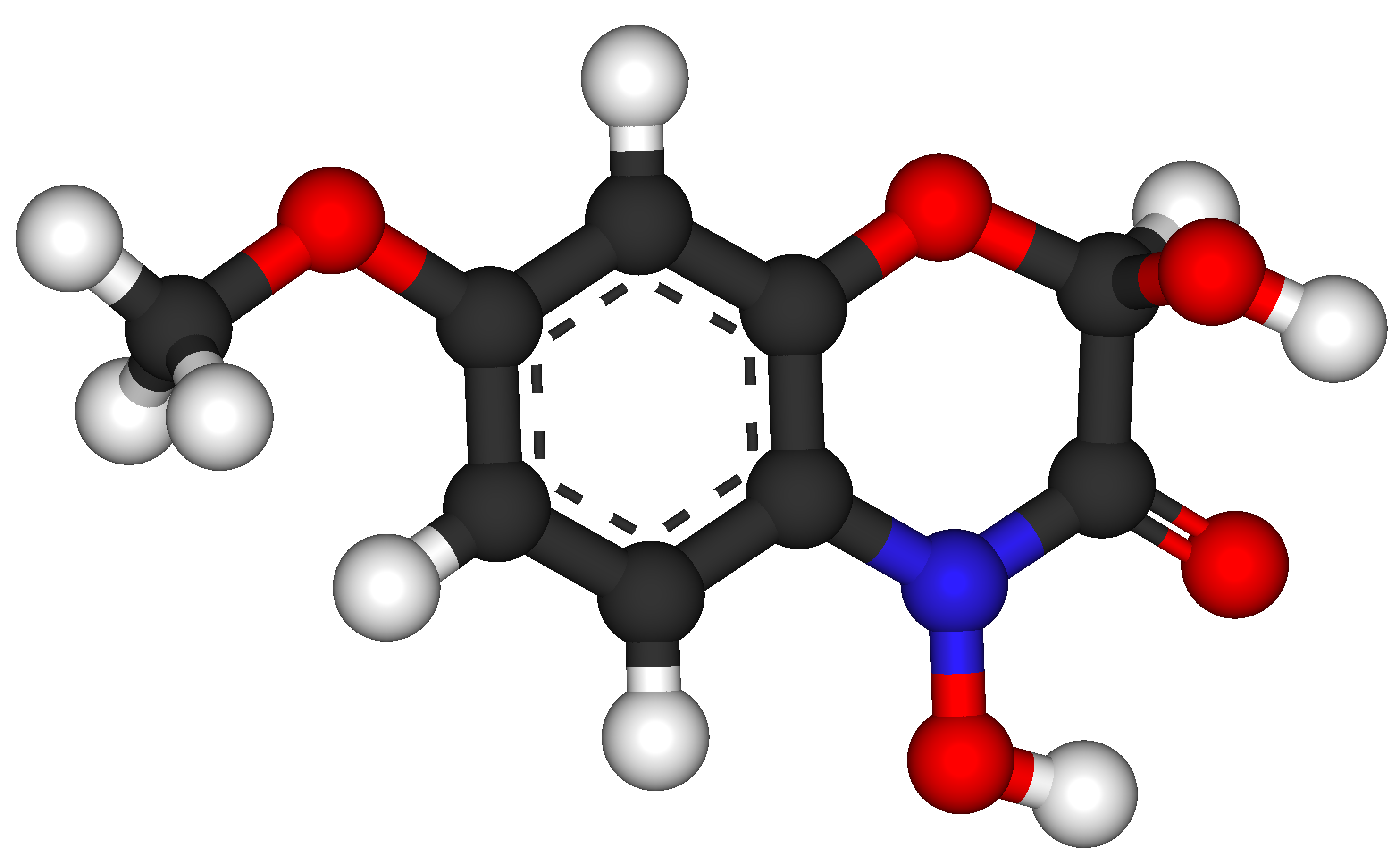

Names
- Preferred IUPAC name 2,4-Dihydroxy-7-methoxy-2H-1,4-benzoxazin-3(4H)-one

Identifiers
CAS Number	15893-52-4
3D model (JSmol)	Interactive image
ChemSpider	2268
PubChem CID	2358
UNII	TI783RU0DR
CompTox Dashboard (EPA)	DTXSID90936021
- InChI: InChI=1S/C9H9NO5/c1-14-5-2-3-6-7(4-5)15-9(12)8(11)10(6)13/h2-4,9,12-13H,1H3 Key: GDNZNIJPBQATCZ-UHFFFAOYSA-N
- SMILES: ON(C1=CC=C(OC)C=C1OC2O)C2=O

Properties
Chemical formula	C_{9}H_{9}NO_{5}
Molar mass	211.173 g·mol^{−1}
- Except where otherwise noted, data are given for materials in their standard state (at 25 °C [77 °F], 100 kPa). verify (what is ?) Infobox references

DIMBOA (2,4-dihydroxy-7-methoxy-1,4-benzoxazin-3-one) is a naturally occurring hydroxamic acid, a benzoxazinoid. DIMBOA is a powerful antibiotic, fungicide, and insecticide present in maize, wheat, rye, and related true grasses (Poaceae).

DIMBOA was first identified in maize in 1962 as the "corn sweet substance". Etiolated maize seedlings have a very sweet, almost saccharin-like taste due to their high DIMBOA content.

== Biosynthesis ==
The biosynthesis pathway leading from maize primary metabolism to the production of DIMBOA has been fully identified. DIMBOA is stored as an inactive precursor, DIMBOA-glucoside, which is activated by glucosidases in response to insect feeding,

The exact level of DIMBOA varies between individual plants, but higher concentrations are typically found in young seedlings and the concentration decreases as the plant ages. Natural variation in the Bx1 gene influences the DIMBOA content of maize seedlings. In adult maize plants, the DIMBOA concentration is low, but it is induced rapidly in response to insect feeding.

In wheat, DIMBOA levels are quickly increased in response to imazethapyr (a herbicide) stress. Weed grasses likely possess a similar response.

=== Downstream compounds ===
The maize methyltransferases Bx10, Bx11, and Bx12 convert DIMBOA into HDMBOA (2-hydroxy-4,7-dimethoxy-1,4-benzoxazin-3-one), which can be more toxic for insect herbivores.

HDMBOA is a precursor to MBOA (6-methoxy-2(3H)-benzoxazolone), a biological nitrification inhibitor (BNI) producted by grass (maize, wheat) roots. By preventing nitrification, more nitrogen ends up retained in the soil and remains available to the plant.

== Natural function ==
In maize, DIMBOA functions as natural defense against European corn borer (Ostrinia nubilalis) larvae, beet armyworms (Spodoptera exigua), corn leaf aphids (Rhopalosiphum maidis), other damaging insect pests, and pathogens, including fungi and bacteria.

In addition to serving as a direct defensive compound due to its toxicity, DIMBOA can also function as a signaling molecule, leading to the accumulation of callose in response to treatment with chitosan (a fungal elicitor) and aphid feeding in maize.

DIMBOA can also form complexes with iron in the rhizosphere and thereby enhance maize iron supply.

In wheat, DIMBOA helps the plant resist imazethapyr by reducing reactive oxygen species accumulation (via iron chelation) and reinforcing structural defenses (similar process to callose formation).

=== Use by pests ===
Specialized insect pests such as the western corn rootworm (Diabrotica virgifera virgifera) can detect complexes between DIMBOA and iron and use these complexes for host identification and foraging.

== Mechanism of action ==
It is unclear why DIMBOA is toxic to so many types of natural enemies of plants. In a chemical study, DIMBOA is found to react with thiols such as 2-mercaptoethanol and produce spriocyte conjugates. The authors speculate that DIMBOA may have a similar inactivating effect on the natural antioxidant glutathione and cystinyl groups in key enzymes.
