= List of pearl millet diseases =

This article is a list of diseases of pearl millet (Pennisetum glaucum).

== Bacterial diseases ==
Bacterial diseases
Bacterial spot	Pseudomonas syringae
Bacterial leaf streak	Xanthomonas campestris pv. pennamericanum
Bacterial leaf stripe	Acidovorax avenae
Stem rot of Pearl Millet	Klebsiella aerogenes

== Fungal diseases ==
Fungal diseases
Bipolaris leaf spot	Bipolaris setariae
Cercospora leaf spot	Cercospora penniseti
Curvularia leaf spot	Curvularia penniseti
Dactuliophora leaf spot	Dactuliophora elongata
Downy mildew	Sclerospora graminicola
Downy mildew	Plasmopara penniseti
Drechslera leaf spot	Drechslera dematioidea
Ergot	Claviceps fusiformis
Exserohilum leaf blight	Exserohilum rostratum
False mildew	Beniowskia sphaeroidea
Head mold	Various fungi
Myrothecium leaf spot	Myrothecium roridum
Phyllosticta leaf blight	Phyllosticta penicillariae
Pyricularia leaf spot	Pyricularia grisea
Rhizoctonia blight	Rhizoctonia solani Rhizoctonia zeae
Rust	Puccinia substriata var. indica
Seedling blight	Various fungi
Smut	Moesziomyces penicillariae
Southern blight	Sclerotium rolfsii
Top rot	Fusarium moniliforme
Zonate leaf spot	Gloeocercospora sorghi

== Viral diseases ==
Viral diseases

Black streaked dwarf virus
Guinea grass mosaic virus
Maize dwarf mosaic virus
Maize streak virus
Panicum mosaic virus
Satellite panicum mosaic virus
Wheat streak mosaic virus

== Nematodes, parasitic ==
Nematodes, parasitic
Burrowing nematode	Radopholus similis
Cyst nematode	Heterodera gambiensis
Dagger nematode	Xiphinema americanum
Lance nematode	Hoplolaimus indicus
Panagrolaimus nematode	Panagrolaimus spp.
Ring nematode	Criconemella ornata
Root knot nematode	Meloidogyne incognita Meloidogyne javanica Meloidogyne arenaria
Root lesion nematode	Pratylenchus mulchandi Pratylenchus brachyurus Pratylenchus zeae
Sting nematode	Belonolaimus longicaudatus
Stubby-root nematode	Paratrichodorus minor
Stunt nematode	Tylenchorhynchus vulgaris Tylenchorhynchus phaseoli Tylenchorhynchus zeae

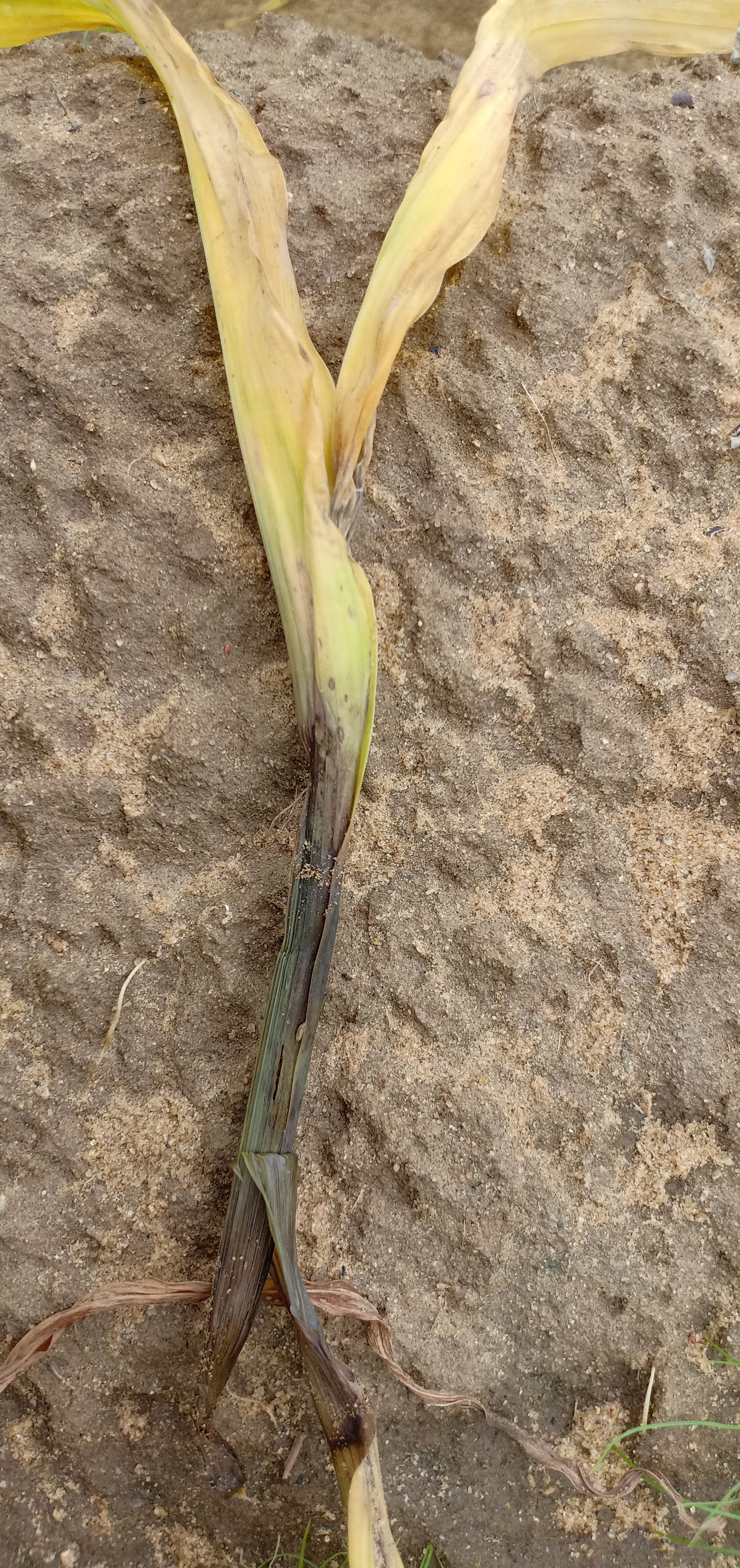
dead heart of bajra seedling infested by shoot fly

== Insects ==
Insect pests include:

Seedling pests

- shoot fly Atherigona approximata (major seedling pest)
- Atherigona soccata, Atherigona oryzae, Atherigona punctata, Atherigona ponti, and Atherigona yorki
- anthomyiid flies Delia arambourgi and Delia flavibasis (Ethiopia)

Stem borers

- lepidopteran borers: Chilo partellus, Chilo infuscatellus, Sesamia calamistis, Sesamia cretica, Sesamia inferens, Diatraea grandiosella, Coniesta ignefusalis, Busseola fusca, Eldana saccharina, Ostrinia furnacalis, and Ostrinia nubilalis

Leaf feeders

- lepidopteran caterpillars: Amsacta moorei, Mythimna loreyi, Mythimna separata, Cnaphalocrocis medinalis, Cnaphalocrocis patnalis, Spodoptera exigua, Spodoptera frugiperda, Spodoptera mauritia, Autoba silicula
- grasshoppers: Diabolocatantops axillaris, Hieroglyphus banian, Hieroglyphus daganensis, Oedaleus senegalensis, and Schistocerca gregaria

Sucking pests

- bugs: Blissus leucopterus, Nysius niger
- hoppers: Cicadulina mbila, Cicadulina storeyi, and Pyrilla perpusilla
- aphids: Rhopalosiphum maidis, Sitobion miscanthi, and Hyalopterus pruni

Other pests

- beetle Chiloloba acuta
- millet midge Geromyia penniseti
- Euproctis spp., Orvasca subnotata, and Helicoverpa armigera
- Spodoptera exempta, Spilarctia obliqua, Pachnoda interrupta, Phyllophaga spp., Thrips hawaiiensis, Myllocerus spp., and Peregrinus maidis
- Holotrichia consanguinea and Holotrichia serrata
- Tribolium castaneum

=== Africa ===
The larvae of several insect species, primarily belonging to the orders Coleoptera, Lepidoptera, Diptera, and Hemiptera, as well as Orthoptera adults, are persistent pearl millet pests in the Sahel. The following pest species are reported for northern Mali.

- Coniesta ignefusalis (pearl millet stem-borer; Lepidoptera, Crambidae) attacks pearl millet, and also sorghum and maize, especially in the Sahel. It is the main pearl millet pest in Senegal.
- Heliocheilus albipunctella (pearl millet head-miner; Lepidoptera, Noctuidae) attacks pearl millet. The larvae bore in a spiral path, destroying florets or grain.
- Geromyia penniseti (millet grain midge): The larvae eat the developing grain and form white pupal cases attached to the tips of spikelets. Reported losses in Senegal are as high as 90 percent.
- Pachnoda interrupta (millet beetle)
- Psalydolytta fusca and Psalydolytta vestita (pearl millet blister beetle; Coleoptera, Meloidae) attack pearl millet. They are major millet pests in Mali.
- Rhinyptia infuscata (Scarabaeidae, Rutelinae, Anomalini) is a nocturnal beetle, recorded as a locally important pest on millet flowers in Niger. Farmers in Niger often fight the species using fires set at night. It is also reported as sorghum pest in Senegal, and as a pest on maize, where the larvae attack the roots.
- Sesamia calamistis (pink stem borer), especially in lowland forests. This species and the sugarcane borer (Eldana saccharina) are the primary pests of the pearl millet in Ivory Coast.
- gall midges (Diptera, Cecidomyiidae): millet grain midge (Geromyia penniseti), sorghum midge (Contarinia sorghicola), and African rice gall midge (Orseolia oryzivora).
- Dysdercus volkeri (cotton-stainer; Hemiptera, Pyrrhocoridae) attacks flowers.

Grasshoppers that frequently attack millets in the Dogon country of Mali are Oedaleus senegalensis, Kraussaria angulifera, Cataloipus cymbiferus, and Diabolocatantops axillaris.

In northern Ghana, Poophilus costalis (spittle bug) is reported as a millet pest, as well as Dysdercus volkeri, Heliocheilus albipunctella, Coniesta ignefusalis, and caterpillars of Amsacta moloneyi and Helicoverpa armigera.

In northern Nigeria, heavy infestations of Hycleus species, including Hycleus terminatus (syn. Mylabris afzelli), Hycleus fimbriatus (syn. Mylabris fimbriatus), Hycleus hermanniae (syn. Coryna hermanniae), and Hycleus chevrolati (syn. Coryna chevrolati), have affected early plantings of pearl millet crops.

=== Other regions ===
In South India, pests include the shoot fly Atherigona approximata.

In North America, regular pests include the chinch bug Blissus leucopterus.

== See also ==
- List of insect pests of millets
- List of sorghum diseases
