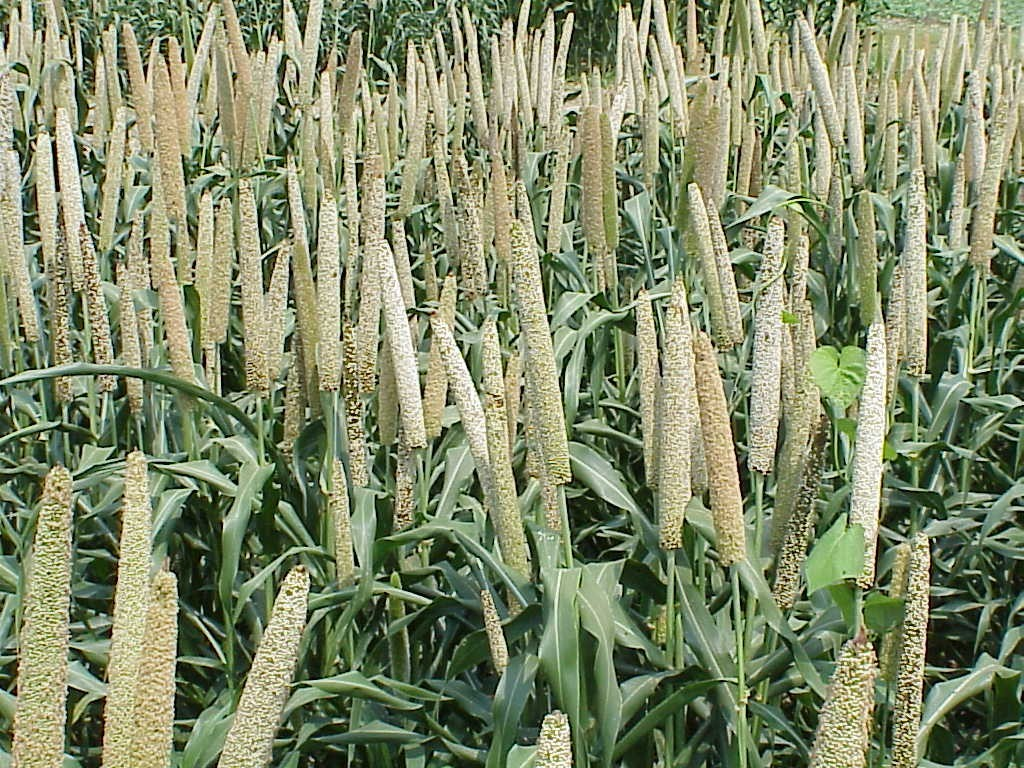
- Pearl millet hybrid for grain

Scientific classification
- Kingdom: Plantae
- Clade: Tracheophytes
- Clade: Angiosperms
- Clade: Monocots
- Clade: Commelinids
- Order: Poales
- Family: Poaceae
- Subfamily: Panicoideae
- Genus: Cenchrus
- Species: C. americanus

Binomial name
- Cenchrus americanus (L.) Morrone

Synonyms
- List: Alopecurus typhoides Burm.f.; Andropogon racemosus (Forssk.) Poir. ex Steud.; Cenchrus paniceus B.Heyne ex Wall.; Cenchrus pycnostachyus Steud.; Cenchrus spicatus (L.) Cav.; Chaetochloa glauca (L.) Scribn.; Chaetochloa lutescens Stuntz; Chamaeraphis glauca (L.) Kuntze; Holcus paniciformis Roxb. ex Hook.f.; Holcus racemosus Forssk.; Holcus spicatus L.; Ixophorus glaucus (L.) Nash; Panicum alopecuroides J.Koenig ex Trin.; Panicum americanum L.; Panicum coeruleum Mill.; Panicum compressum Balb. ex Steud.; Panicum glaucum L.; Panicum holcoides Trin.; Panicum indicum Mill.; Panicum involucratum Roxb.; Panicum spicatum (L.) Roxb.; Penicillaria arabica A.Braun; Penicillaria deflexa Andersson ex A.Braun; Penicillaria elongata Schrad. ex Schltdl.; Penicillaria involucrata (Roxb.) Schult.; Penicillaria nigritarum Schltdl.; Penicillaria plukenetii Link; Penicillaria roxburghii A.Braun; Penicillaria solitaria Stokes; Penicillaria spicata (L.) Willd.; Pennisetum albicauda Stapf & C.E.Hubb.; Pennisetum americanum convar. spicatum (L.) Tzvelev; Pennisetum americanum convar. typhoides Tzvelev; Pennisetum ancylochaete Stapf & C.E.Hubb.; Pennisetum aureum Link; Pennisetum cereale Trin.; Pennisetum cinereum Stapf & C.E.Hubb.; Pennisetum echinurus (K.Schum.) Stapf & C.E.Hubb.; Pennisetum gambiense Stapf & C.E.Hubb.; Pennisetum gibbosum Stapf & C.E.Hubb.; Pennisetum giganteum Ten. ex Steud.; Pennisetum glaucum (L.) R.Br.; Pennisetum leonis Stapf & C.E.Hubb.; Pennisetum maiwa Stapf & C.E.Hubb.; Pennisetum malacochaete Stapf & C.E.Hubb.; Pennisetum megastachyum Steud.; Pennisetum nigritarum (Schltdl.) T.Durand & Schinz; Pennisetum plukenetii (Link) T.Durand & Schinz; Pennisetum pycnostachyum Stapf & C.E.Hubb.; Pennisetum spicatum (L.) Körn.; Phleum africanum Lour.; Setaria glauca (L.) P.Beauv.; Setaria rufa Chevall.; Setaria sericea (Aiton) P.Beauv.; Setariopsis glauca (L.) Samp.

= Pearl millet =

Species of cultivated grass

Pearl millet (Cenchrus americanus, commonly known as the synonym Pennisetum glaucum) is the most widely grown type of millet. It has been grown in Africa and the Indian subcontinent since prehistoric times. The center of diversity and suggested area of domestication for the crop is in the Sahel zone of West Africa.

== Description ==
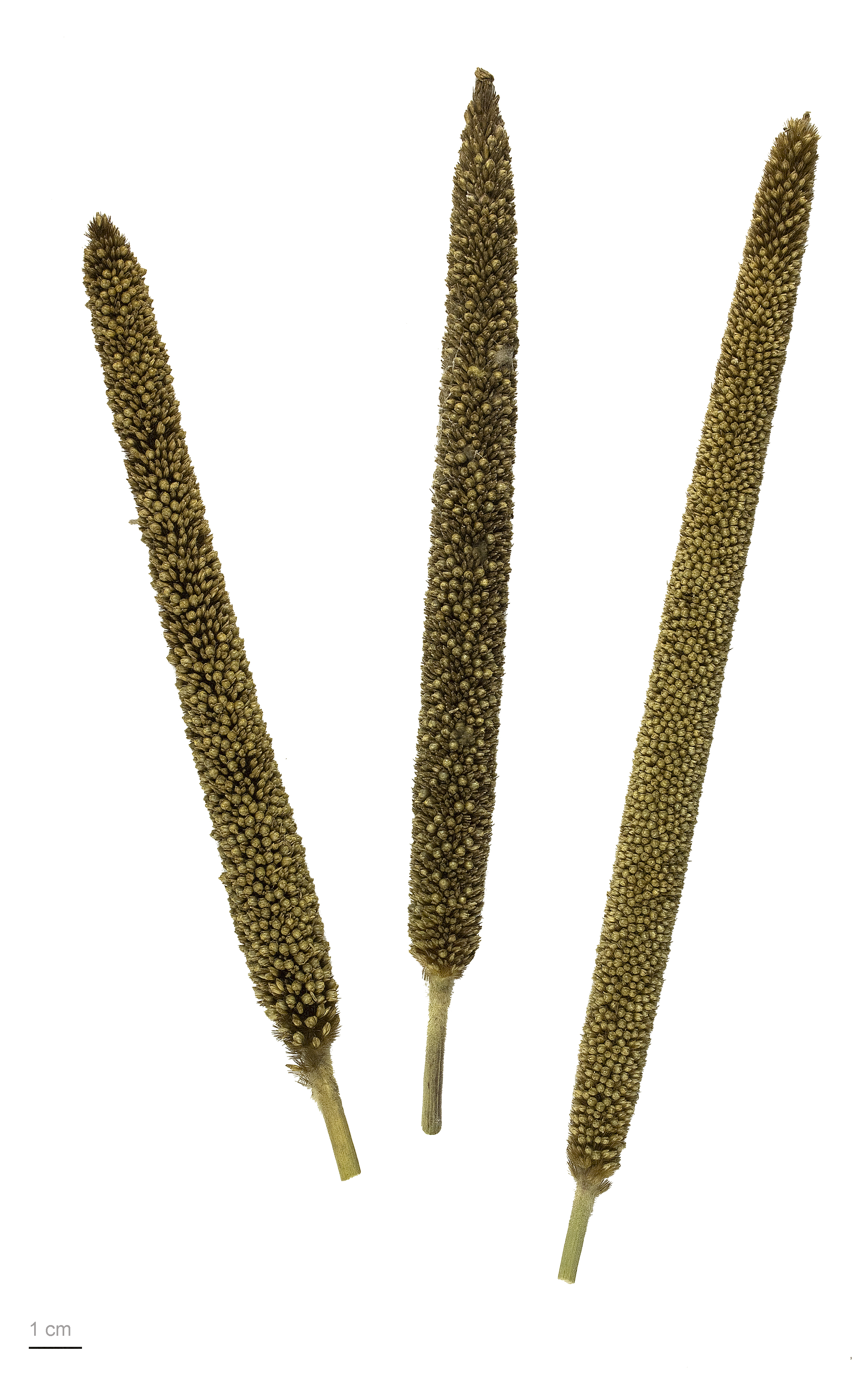
Seed heads

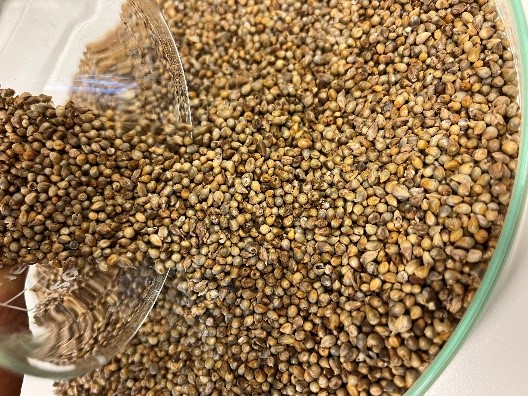
Pearl millet grains

Pearl millet has ovoid grains of 3–4 millimetres (1/8–5/32 in) length, the largest kernels of all varieties of millet (not including sorghum). These can be nearly white, pale yellow, brown, grey, slate blue or purple. The 1,000-seed weight can be anything from 2.5 to 14 g with a mean of 8 g.

The height of the plant ranges from 0.5–4 metres (1 ft 8 in – 13 ft 1 in).

Pearl millet varieties from the world collection probably have more variation in physical characteristics than any other millet. Kernel shape has different classifications: obovate, hexagonal, lanceolate, globular and elliptical. In Africa, pearl millet is classified as either globular or lanceolate and hexagonal. Most of the millets are very similar to each other in basic structures, although there are some very specific differences.

== Cultivation ==
Recent archaeobotanical research has confirmed the presence of domesticated pearl millet on the Sahel zone of northern Mali between 2500 and 2000 BCE. The Sahel zone is the species' center of diversity and suggested area of domestication.

Pearl millet is well adapted to growing areas characterized by drought, low soil fertility, low moisture, and high temperature. It performs well in soils with high salinity or low pH. Because of its tolerance to difficult growing conditions, it can be grown in areas where other cereal crops, such as maize or wheat, would not survive. Pearl millet is a summer annual crop well-suited for double cropping and rotations. The grain and forage are valuable as food and feed resources in Africa, Russia, India and China.

Today, pearl millet is grown on over 260,000 square kilometres (100,000 sq mi) of land worldwide. It accounts for about 50% of the total world production of millets.

World production of millets has been stable during the 1980s. According to FAO, 39.4 million hectares (97 million acres) of millet were planted in 1987 with an average production of only 704 kilograms per hectare (628 lb/acre).

=== Pests ===
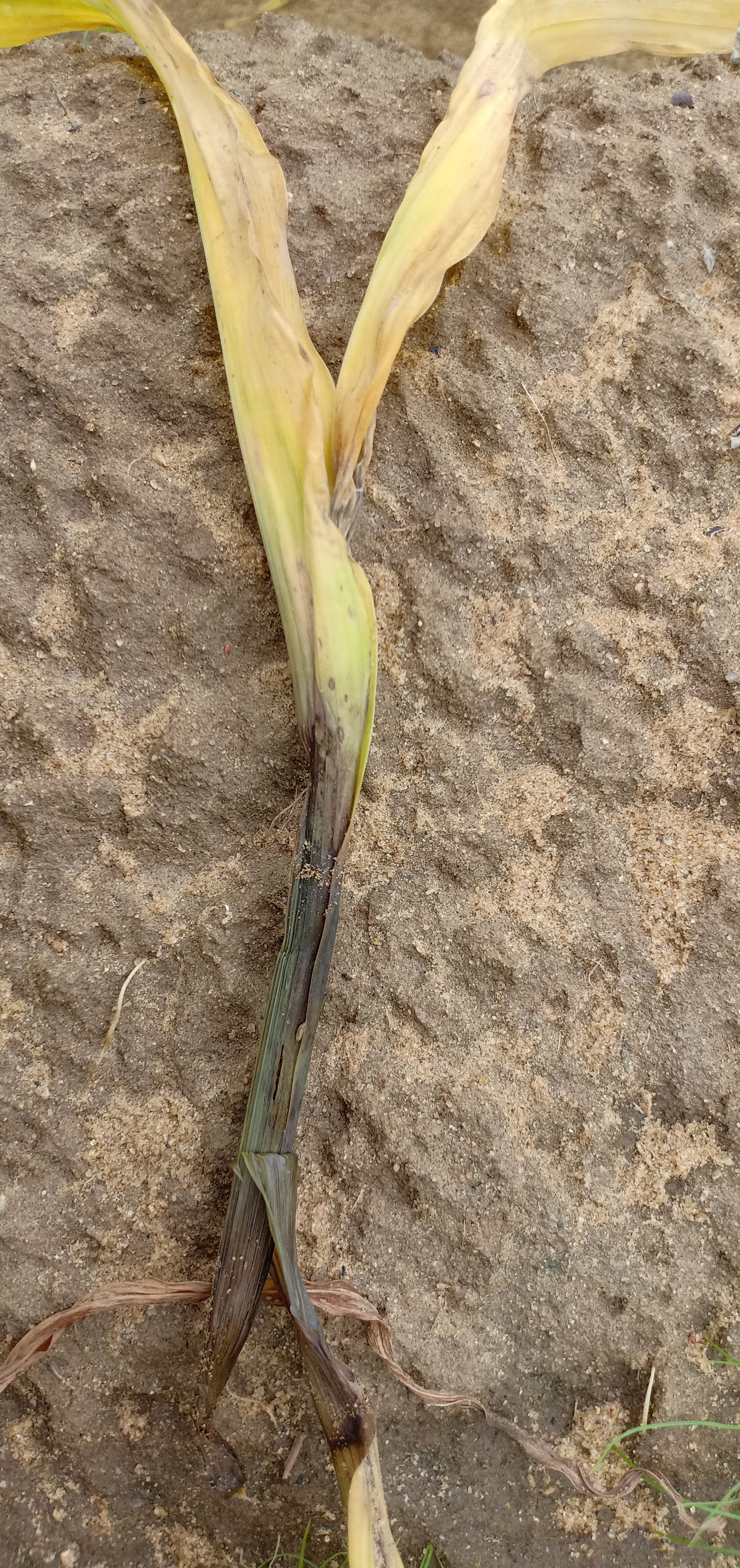
Shoot fly infested plant

Insect pests include Anoecia corni, An. cornicola, Anoecia fulviabdominalis, An. vagans, Aphis gossypii, Forda hirsuta, F. orientalis, Geoica utricularia, Hysteroneura setariae, Melanaphis sacchari, Protaphis middletonii, Rhopalosiphum maidis, R. rufiabdominale, Schizaphis graminum, Sipha elegans, Sipha maydis, Sitobion avenae, Sit. leelamaniae, Sit. pauliani, Tetraneura africana, Tetraneura basui, Tetraneura fusiformis, and T. yezoensis.

==== Africa ====
The larvae of several insect species, primarily belonging to the orders Coleoptera, Lepidoptera, Diptera, and Hemiptera, as well as Orthoptera adults, are persistent pearl millet pests in the Sahel. The following pest species are reported for northern Mali.

- Coniesta ignefusalis (pearl millet stem-borer; Lepidoptera, Crambidae) attacks pearl millet, and also sorghum and maize, especially in the Sahel. It is the main pearl millet pest in Senegal.
- Heliocheilus albipunctella (pearl millet head-miner; Lepidoptera, Noctuidae) attacks pearl millet. The larvae bore in a spiral path, destroying florets or grain.
- Geromyia penniseti (millet grain midge): The larvae eat the developing grain and form white pupal cases attached to the tips of spikelets. Reported losses in Senegal are as high as 90 percent.
- Pachnoda interrupta (millet beetle)
- Psalydolytta fusca and Ps. vestita (pearl millet blister beetle; Coleoptera, Meloidae) attack pearl millet. They are major millet pests in Mali.
- Rhinyptia infuscata (Scarabaeidae, Rutelinae, Anomalini) is a nocturnal beetle, recorded as a locally important pest on millet flowers in Niger. Farmers in Niger often fight the species using fires set at night. It is also reported as sorghum pest in Senegal, and as a pest on maize, where the larvae attack the roots.
- Sesamia calamistis (pink stem borer), especially in lowland forests. This species and the sugarcane borer (Eldana saccharina) are the primary pests of the pearl millet in Ivory Coast.
- gall midges (Diptera, Cecidomyiidae): millet grain midge (Geromyia penniseti), sorghum midge (Contarinia sorghicola), and African rice gall midge (Orseolia oryzivora).
- Dysdercus volkeri (cotton-stainer; Hemiptera, Pyrrhocoridae) attacks flowers.

Grasshoppers that frequently attack millets in the Dogon country of Mali are Oedaleus senegalensis, Kraussaria angulifera, Cataloipus cymbiferus, and Diabolocatantops axillaris.

In northern Ghana, Poophilus costalis (spittle bug) is reported as a millet pest, as well as Dysdercus volkeri, Heliocheilus albipunctella, Coniesta ignefusalis, and caterpillars of Amsacta moloneyi and Helicoverpa armigera.

In northern Nigeria, heavy infestations of Hycleus species, including Hycleus terminatus (syn. Mylabris afzelli), Hycleus fimbriatus (syn. Mylabris fimbriatus), Hycleus hermanniae (syn. Coryna hermanniae), and Hycleus chevrolati (syn. Coryna chevrolati), have affected early plantings of pearl millet crops.

==== Other regions ====
In South India, pests include the shoot fly Atherigona approximata.

In North America, regular pests include the chinch bug Blissus leucopterus.

== Culinary use ==
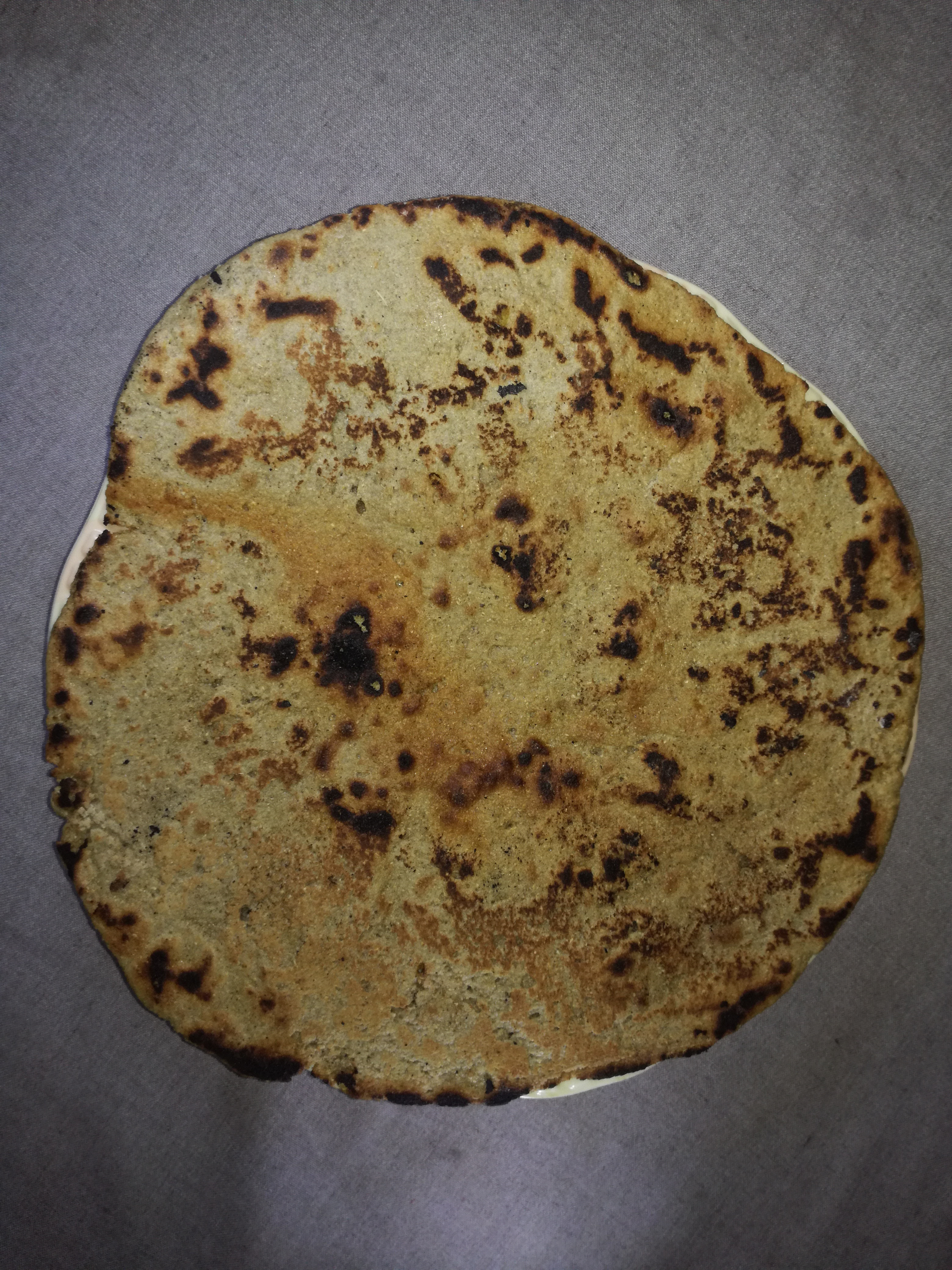
Roti

Pearl millet is commonly used to make bhakri. It is also boiled to make a Tamil porridge called kamban choru or kamban koozh. In Rajasthani cuisine bajre ki khatti rabdi is a traditional dish made with pearl millet flour and yogurt. Flatbreads made of pearl millet flour are served with various types of kadhi and bhaaji in meals. In Namibia, pearl millet flour is used to make oshifima, a staple food in the northern part of Namibia. In Africa especially Nigeria and some areas, they use millet for making traditional foods like Gruel/porridge and even local beer. The local alcoholic (Burukutu) beverage is often produced in Tropical African countries such as Nigeria, Togo, Kenya, Ethiopia, and Burundi as one of the major traditional and local alcoholic drinks.

=== Around the world ===
==== India ====
India is the largest producer of pearl millet. India began growing pearl millet between 1500 and 1100 BCE. It is currently unknown how it made its way to India, but it likely arrived originally from across Africa, and via the Red Sea during Indus Valley Trade networks. Rajasthan is the highest-producing state in India. The first hybrid of pearl millet developed in India in 1965 is called the HB1.

Sajje is the local name of the pearl millet in Karnataka and is mostly grown in the semiarid districts of North Karnataka. Sajje is milled and used for making flatbread called 'sajje rotti' and is eaten with yennegai (stuffed brinjal) and yogurt.

Kambu is the Tamil name of pearl millet and is a common food across the Indian state of Tamil Nadu. It is the second important food for Tamil people consumed predominantly in the hot humid summer months from February through May every year. It is made into a gruel and consumed along with buttermilk or consumed as dosa or idly.

Pearl millet is called bajra in Northern Indian states. There was a time when pearl millets along with finger millets and sorghum were the staple food crops in these states but it reduced to a mere cattle fodder crop after the Green Revolution in the 1960s.

==== Africa ====
The second largest producer of pearl millet and the first to start cultivation, Africa has been successful in bringing back this lost crop.

===== Sahel =====
Pearl millet is an important food across the Sahel region of Africa. It is a main staple (along with sorghum) in a large region of northern Nigeria, Niger, Mali and Burkina Faso. In Nigeria it is usually grown as an intercrop with sorghum and cowpea, the different growth habits, growth period and drought vulnerability of the three crops maximising total productivity and minimising the risk of total crop failure. It is often ground into a flour, rolled into large balls, parboiled, liquefied into a watery paste using fermented milk, and then consumed as a beverage. This beverage, called "fura" in Hausa, is a popular drink in northern Nigeria and southern Niger. Pearl millet is a food widely used in Borno state and its surrounding states, it is the most widely grown and harvested crop. There are many products that are obtained from the processing of the crop.

===== Namibia =====
In Namibia, pearl millet is locally known as "mahangu" and is grown mainly in the north of that country, where it is the staple food. In the dry, unpredictable climate of this area it grows better than alternatives such as maize. The regions in which this crop is produced are: Zambezi, Kavango East, Kavango West, Ohangwena, Omusati, Oshana, Oshikoto, and; in parts of the Otjozondjupa region, in the Tsumkwe area.

Mahangu is usually made into a porridge called "oshifima" (or "oshithima"), or fermented to make a drink called "ontaku" or "oshikundu".

Traditionally, the mahangu is pounded with heavy pieces of wood in a 'pounding area'. The floor of the pounding area is covered with a concrete-like coating made from the material of termite mounds. After pounding, winnowing may be used to remove the chaff.

Some industrial grain processing facilities now exist, such as those operated by Namib Mills. Efforts are also being made to develop smaller scale processing using food extrusion and other methods. In a food extruder, the mahangu is milled into a paste before being forced through metal die. Products made this way include breakfast cereals, including puffed grains and porridge, pasta shapes, and "rice". Pearl millet is also a vital feedstock for cattle, goats and chickens which can also be explored as an enterprise.

== Research and development ==
Recently more productive varieties of pearl millet have been introduced, enabling farmers to increase production considerably.

To combat the problem of micronutrient malnutrition in Africa and Asia, a study of serving iron-biofortified pearl millets which is bred conventionally without genetic modification to a control group is proved to have higher level of iron absorbance by the group.

Around 1000 pearl millet genotypes (including 31 wild genotypes) have been sequenced, identifying the genetic diversity of this staple crop and aiding breeding to select for particular characteristics. A reference genotype of pearl millet (Tift 23D2B1-P1-P5) has been fully sequenced, which holds around 38,579 genes. Some of these genes are for wax biosynthesis, which is known to be involved in tolerance to abiotic stresses in pearl millet. The International Crops Research Institute for the Semi-Arid Tropics is evaluating crop wild relatives and will introgress abiotic tolerant traits into cultivated genotypes and make them available for pearl millet improvement.

A 2015 study provided a genetic map.

== In culture ==
2023 was the International Year of Millets, declared by the United Nations General Assembly in 2021.

== Gallery ==
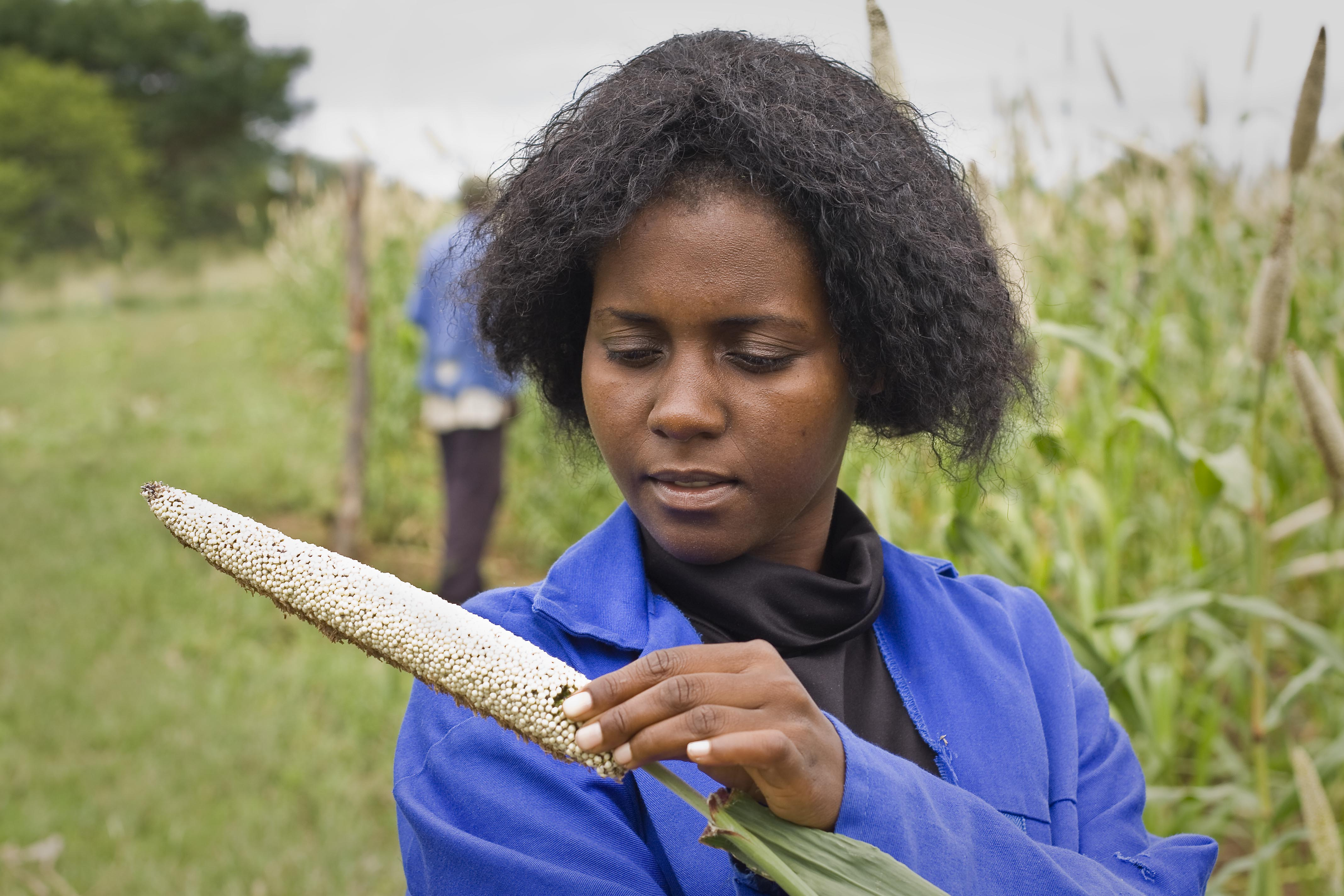
Agronomist, Zimbabwe

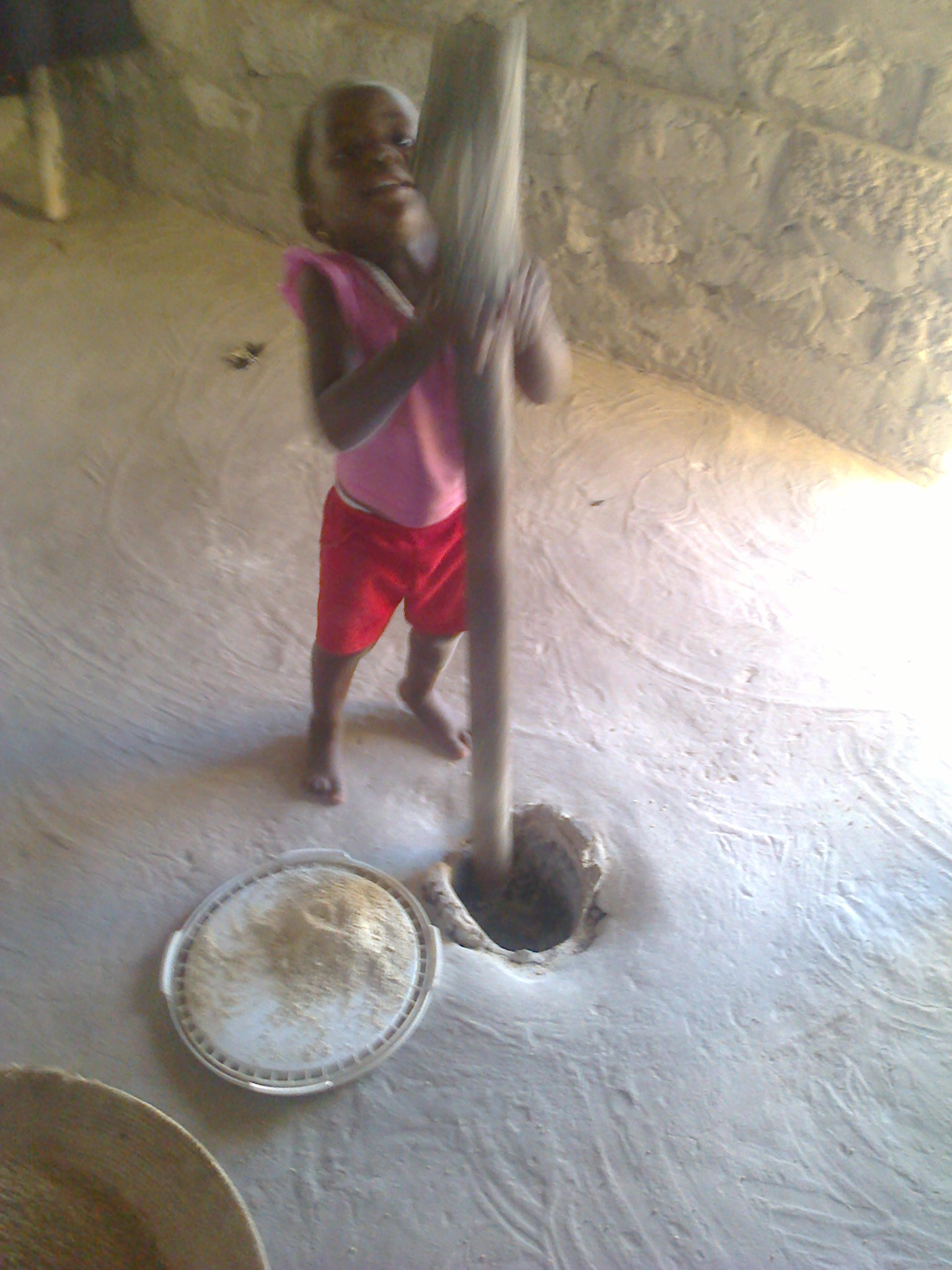
Mahangu pounding in Namibia

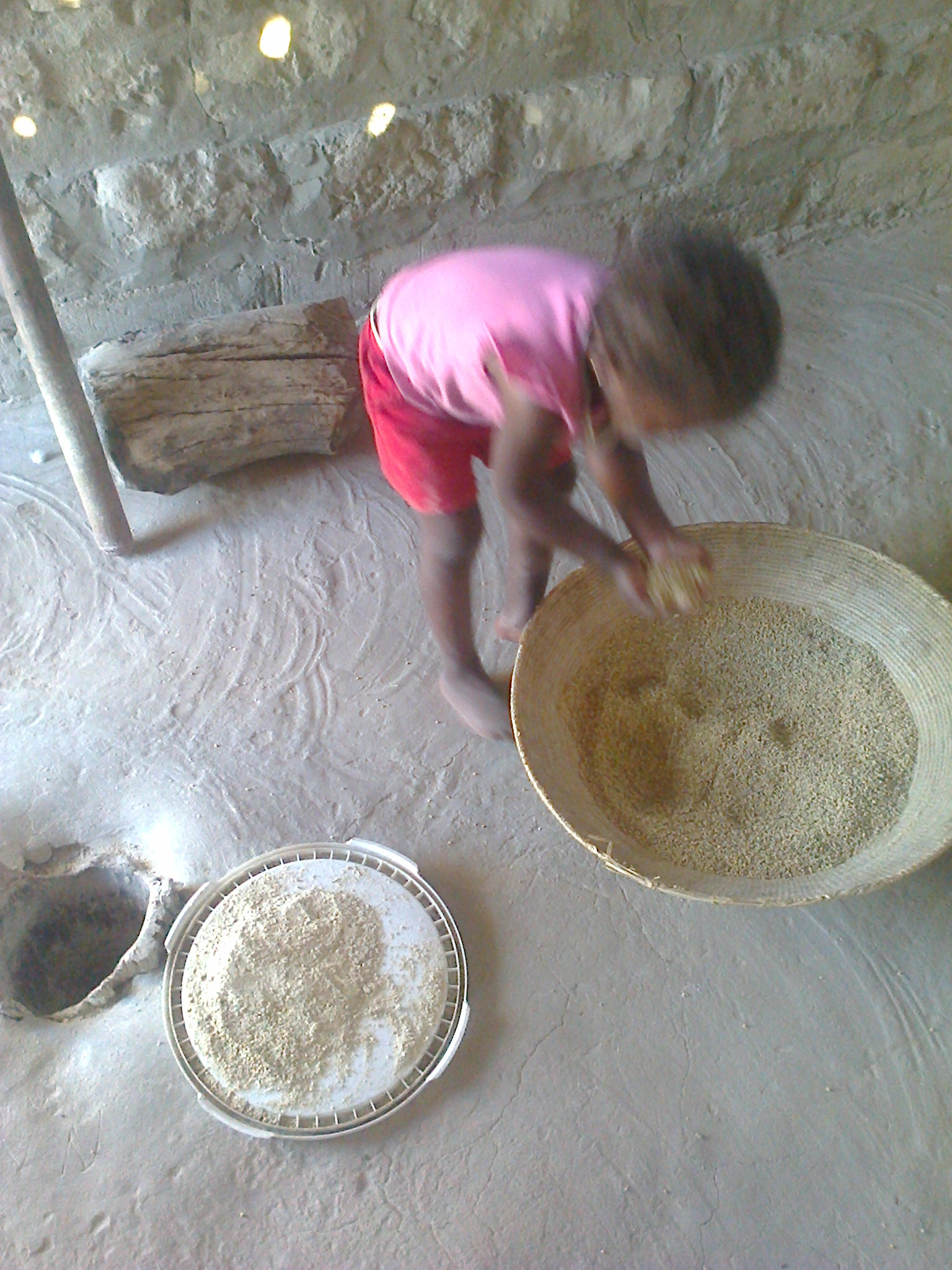
Mahangu pounding in Namibia

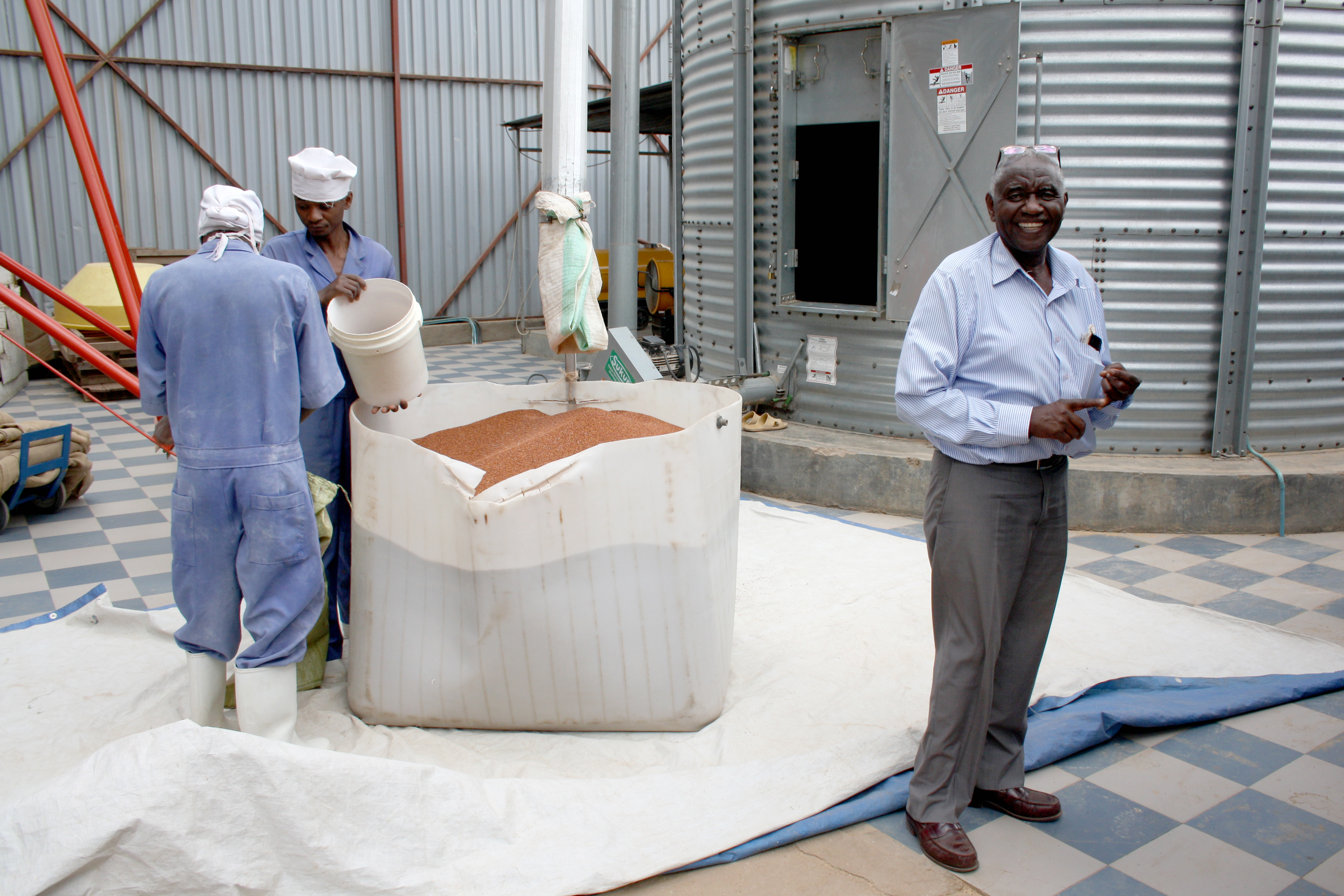
Flour mill, Tanzania

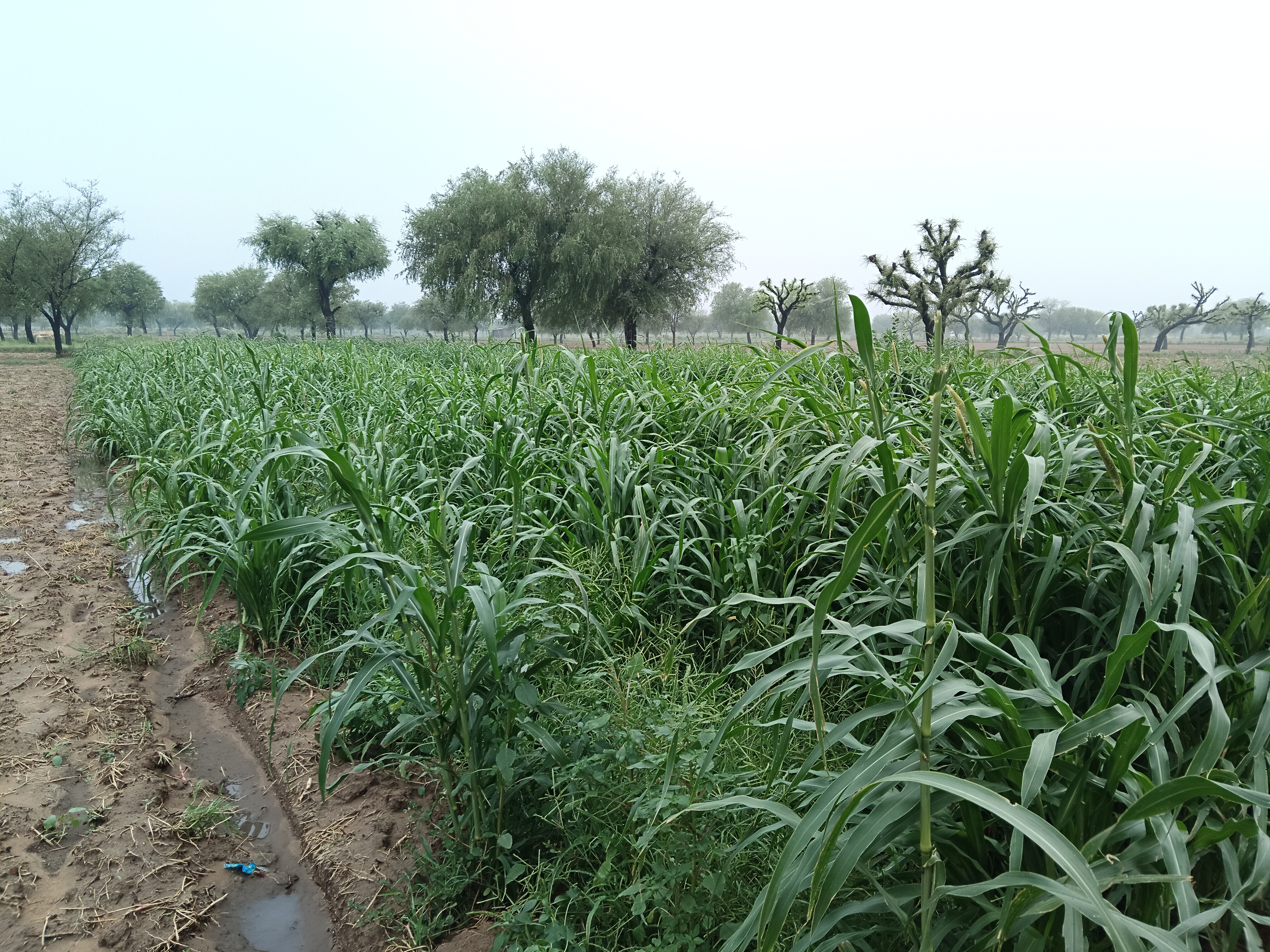
Pearl millet in fields, India.
