= Anoecia krizusi =

Scientific classification
- Kingdom: Animalia
- Phylum: Arthropoda
- Class: Insecta
- Order: Hemiptera
- Suborder: Sternorrhyncha
- Family: Aphididae
- Genus: Anoecia
- Species: A. krizusi

Binomial name
- Anoecia krizusi (Börner, 1950)

Species of aphid

Anoecia krizusi is a species of aphid in the subfamily Anoeciinae. It has been recorded as a millet pest.
