= Anoecia cornicola =

Scientific classification
- Kingdom: Animalia
- Phylum: Arthropoda
- Class: Insecta
- Order: Hemiptera
- Suborder: Sternorrhyncha
- Family: Aphididae
- Genus: Anoecia
- Species: A. cornicola

Binomial name
- Anoecia cornicola (Walsh, 1863)

Synonyms
- Eriosoma cornicola

Species of aphid

Anoecia cornicola is a species of aphid in the subfamily Anoeciinae. It has been recorded as a pest of Sorghum bicolor, Setaria glauca, Setaria viridis, Echinochloa crus-galli, Zea mays, Eragrostis major, Digitaria sanguinalis, and Panicum capillare in the United States.
