= Rhinyptia glabriceps =

Scientific classification
- Kingdom: Animalia
- Phylum: Arthropoda
- Clade: Pancrustacea
- Class: Insecta
- Order: Coleoptera
- Suborder: Polyphaga
- Infraorder: Scarabaeiformia
- Family: Scarabaeidae
- Genus: Rhinyptia
- Species: R. glabriceps

Binomial name
- Rhinyptia glabriceps Frey, 1976

Species of beetle

Rhinyptia glabriceps is a species of beetle of the family Scarabaeidae. It is found in Ethiopia.

== Description ==
Adults reach a length of about 10–12 mm (0.39–0.47 in). The upper and lower surfaces are glossy and yellowish-brown, with the head darker reddish-brown. The upper side is glabrous, but the tip of the pygidium is finely covered with light brown hairs. The underside has fine hairs on the thorax and apical segment, and scattered hairs on the ventral segments.
