= Pratylenchus mulchandi =

Scientific classification
- Domain: Eukaryota
- Kingdom: Animalia
- Phylum: Nematoda
- Class: Secernentea
- Order: Tylenchida
- Family: Pratylenchidae
- Genus: Pratylenchus
- Species: P. mulchandi

Binomial name
- Pratylenchus mulchandi Nandakumar & Khera, 1970

Species of roundworm

Pratylenchus mulchandi, or the Root lesion nematode, is a plant pathogenic nematode infecting pearl millet. The nematode was first identified in Rajasthan, India.

== See also ==
- Pearl millet diseases
