= Anoecia vagans =

Scientific classification
- Kingdom: Animalia
- Phylum: Arthropoda
- Class: Insecta
- Order: Hemiptera
- Suborder: Sternorrhyncha
- Family: Aphididae
- Genus: Anoecia
- Species: A. vagans

Binomial name
- Anoecia vagans (Koch, C.L., 1856)

Species of aphid

Anoecia vagans is a species of aphid in the subfamily Anoeciinae. It has been recorded as a millet pest.
