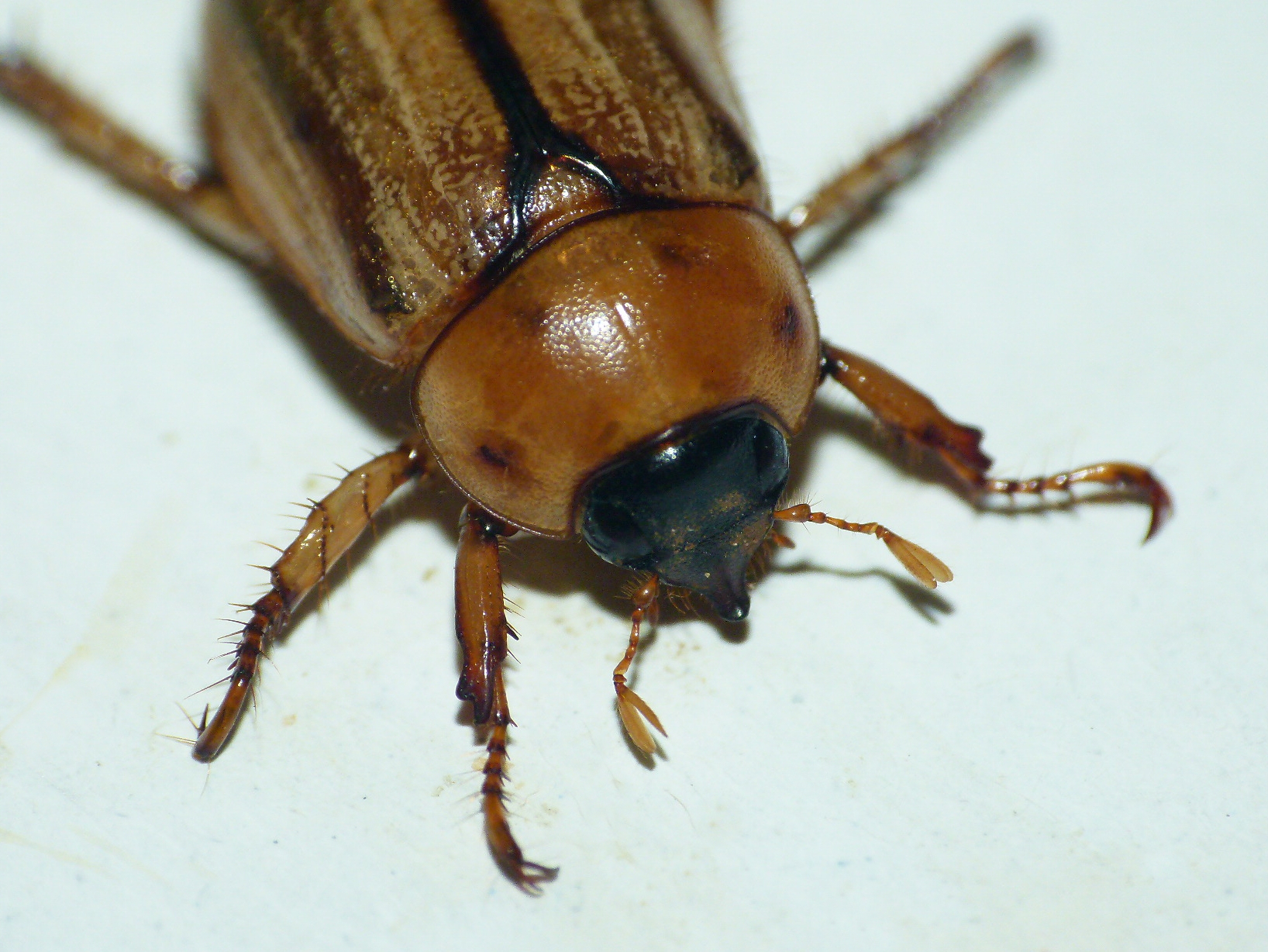
- Rhinyptia indica showing clypeal "snout"

Scientific classification
- Kingdom: Animalia
- Phylum: Arthropoda
- Class: Insecta
- Order: Coleoptera
- Suborder: Polyphaga
- Infraorder: Scarabaeiformia
- Family: Scarabaeidae
- Tribe: Anomalini
- Genus: Rhinyptia; Burmeister, 1844

= Rhinyptia =

Genus of beetles

Rhinyptia is a genus of scarab beetles. The genus is characterised by the clypeus narrowing into a long and pointed tip (a "snout"). The male has the outer claw of the mid leg unforked. There are about 20 species in the genus and are found in Asia and Africa.

The African forms are placed in the subgenus Pararhinyptia. The larvae are white and curled (also known as whitegrubs) as in other scarabs living under the ground and feeding on roots of various plants. Adults feed on flowers and their emergence is associated with the flowering of various grasses including cultivated millet and cereal crops. Adults are attracted to lights.

Rhinyptia infuscata has been recorded as a locally important pest on pearl millet flowers in Niger. As it is a nocturnal beetle, farmers in Niger often fight the species using fires set at night. It is also reported as sorghum pest in Senegal, and as a pest on maize, where the larvae attack the roots.
