= Hoplolaimus indicus =

Scientific classification
- Kingdom: Animalia
- Phylum: Nematoda
- Class: Secernentea
- Order: Tylenchida
- Family: Hoplolaimidae
- Genus: Hoplolaimus
- Species: H. indicus

Binomial name
- Hoplolaimus indicus Sher, (1963)

Species of flowering plant

Hoplolaimus indicus is a plant pathogenic nematode affecting pearl millet.

== See also ==
- List of pearl millet diseases
