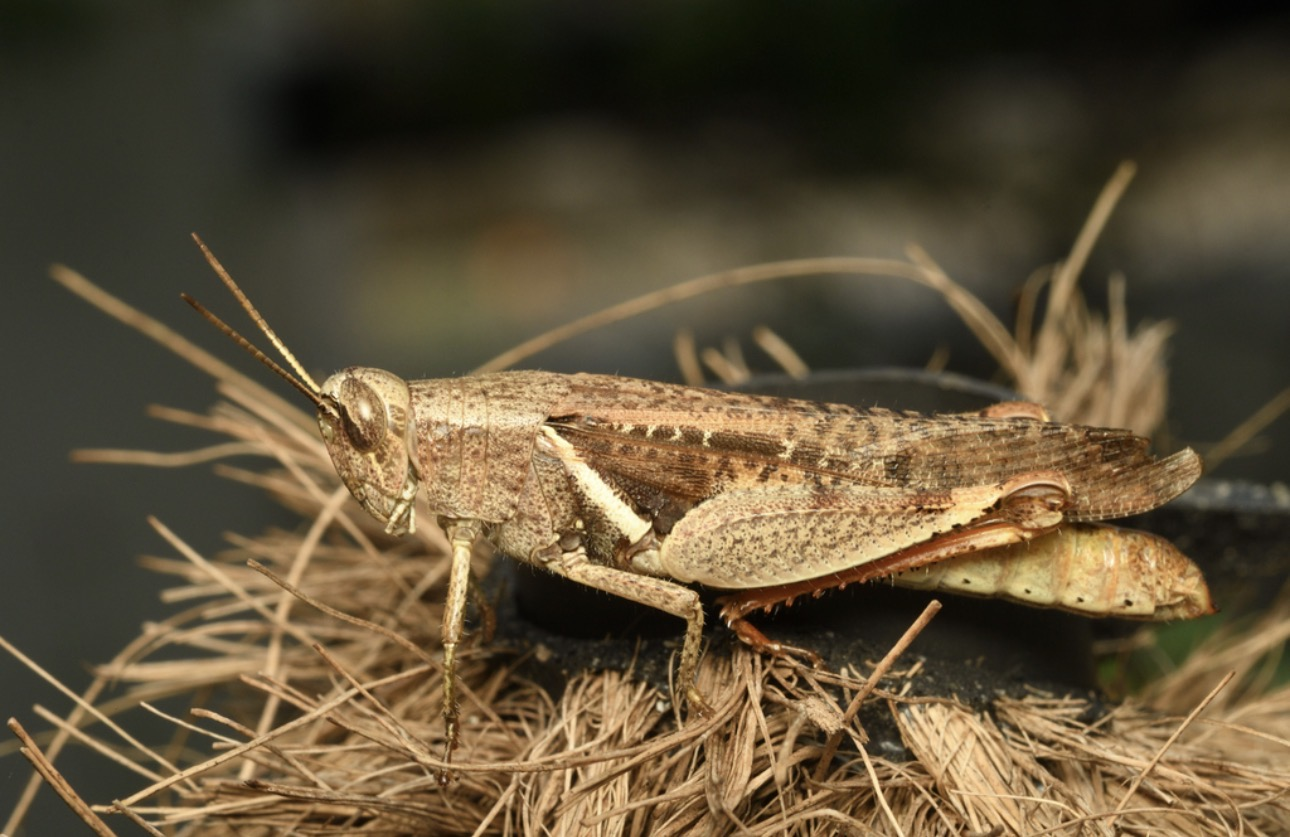
- Diabolocatantops innotabilis in Kerala, India

Scientific classification
- Kingdom: Animalia
- Phylum: Arthropoda
- Clade: Pancrustacea
- Class: Insecta
- Order: Orthoptera
- Suborder: Caelifera
- Family: Acrididae
- Tribe: Catantopini
- Genus: Diabolocatantops; Jago, 1984

= Diabolocatantops =

Genus of grasshoppers

Diabolocatantops is a genus of grasshoppers (Caelifera: Acrididae), in the subfamily Catantopinae and tribe Catantopini, erected by Nick Jago in 1984. Species can be found in Africa, India, China and Indo-China.

== Species ==
The Orthoptera Species File lists the following:

1. Diabolocatantops axillaris (Thunberg, 1815) - type species (as Gryllus axillaris Thunberg = D. axillaris axillaris)
2. Diabolocatantops consobrinus (Karny, 1907)
3. Diabolocatantops innotabilis (Walker, 1870)
4. Diabolocatantops pinguis (Stål, 1861)
5. Diabolocatantops pulchellus (Walker, 1870)
6. Diabolocatantops rufipennis Li & Jin, 1984
7. Diabolocatantops signatipes (Walker, 1870)
8. Diabolocatantops sukhadae Bhowmik, 1986

== Gallery ==
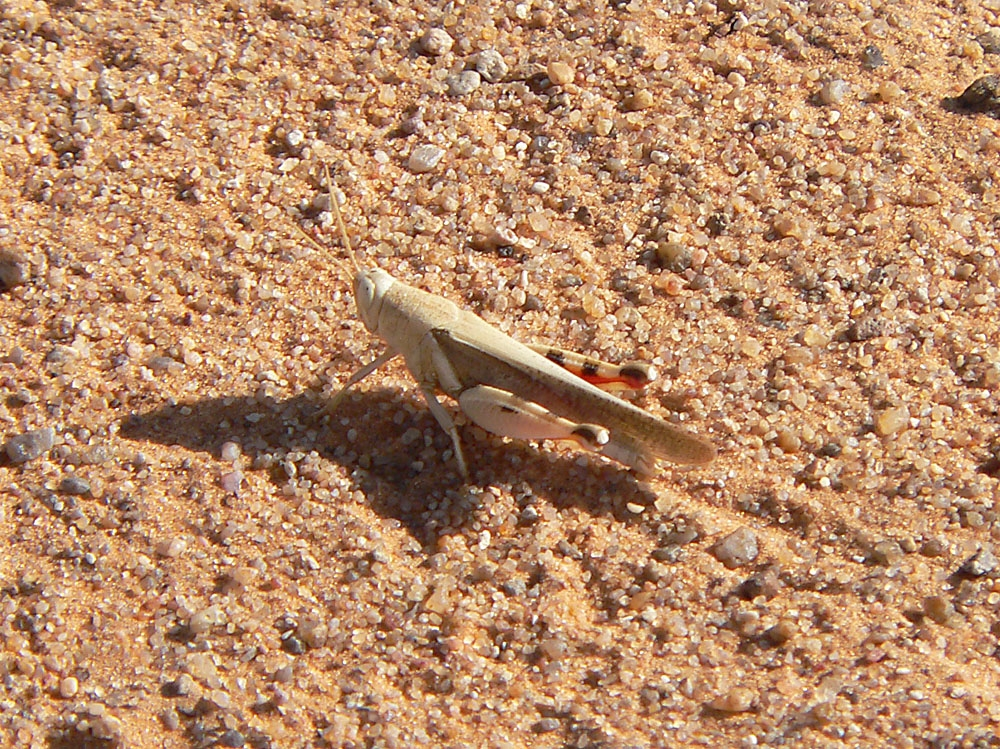
D. axillaris

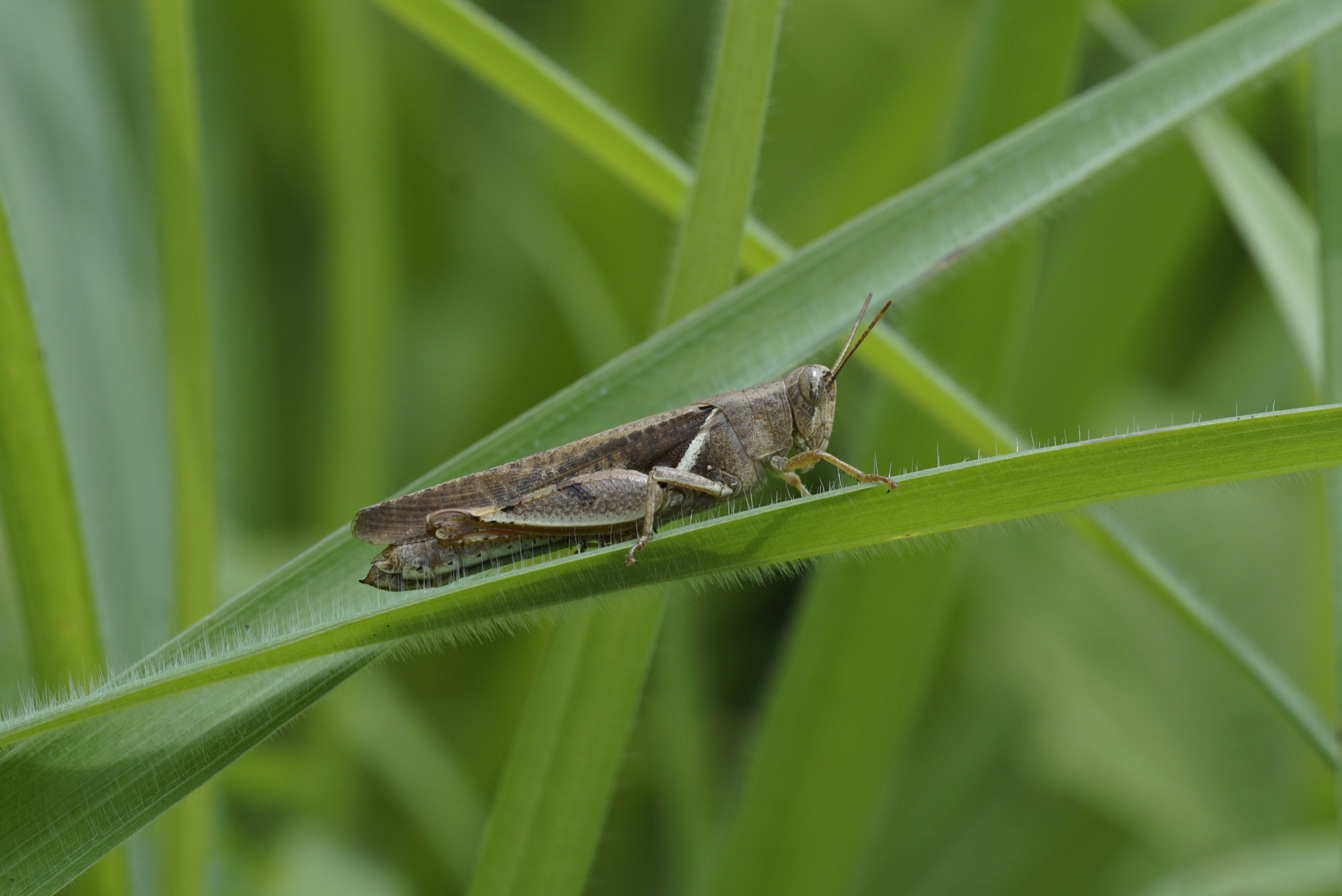
D. pinguis
