= Geromyia =

Scientific classification
- Kingdom: Animalia
- Phylum: Arthropoda
- Class: Insecta
- Order: Diptera
- Family: Cecidomyiidae
- Supertribe: Cecidomyiidi
- Genus: Geromyia; Coutin & Harris, 1969

Genus of flies

Geromyia is a genus of flies belonging to the family Cecidomyiidae.

The species of this genus are found in Western Africa.

Species:

- Geromyia akolaensis Grover & Madhu Bakhshi, 1978
- Geromyia penniseti (Felt, 1920)
