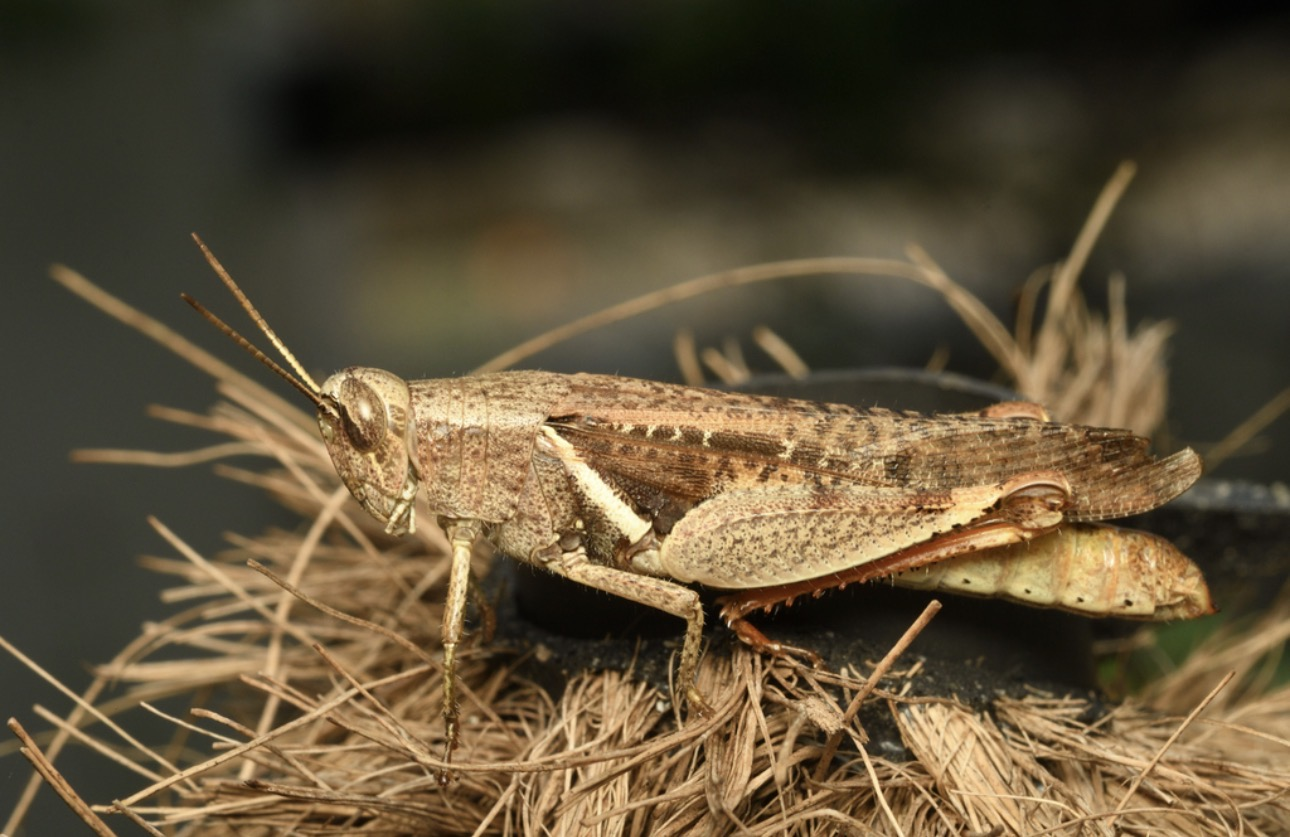

Scientific classification
- Kingdom: Animalia
- Phylum: Arthropoda
- Clade: Pancrustacea
- Class: Insecta
- Order: Orthoptera
- Suborder: Caelifera
- Family: Acrididae
- Genus: Diabolocatantops
- Species: D. innotabilis

Binomial name
- Diabolocatantops innotabilis (Walker, 1870)

Synonyms
- Acridium innotabile Walker, 1870

= Diabolocatantops innotabilis =

Species of short-horned grasshopper

Diabolocatantops innotabilis is a species of short-horned grasshopper found in South Asia.

== Appearance ==
The male is described as tawny and slender. The head is smooth, with a hexagonal tip to the vertex. The front is largely punctured with four well-defined keels. The eyes are ferruginous and elongate-elliptical. The prothorax is finely scabrous with an extremely slight keel and a hind border that is slightly angular. The prosternal spine is thick, not tapering, with a rounded tip. The hind femora are as long as the abdomen, with three black bands above and red on the inner side. The hind tibiae and tarsi are red. The fore wings are cinereous (ash-gray), a little shorter than the body, with many blackish transverse sectors. The hind wings are pellucid (clear) with black veins.

== Distribution and ecology ==
Diabolocatantops innotabilis is found in South Asia, including India, Sri Lanka, Maldives, Pakistan, Bangladesh, Bhutan, and Nepal. The type specimen is from Ceylon (Sri Lanka).

It is a polyphagous (plant-eating) species and is often considered a minor pest of various crops.
