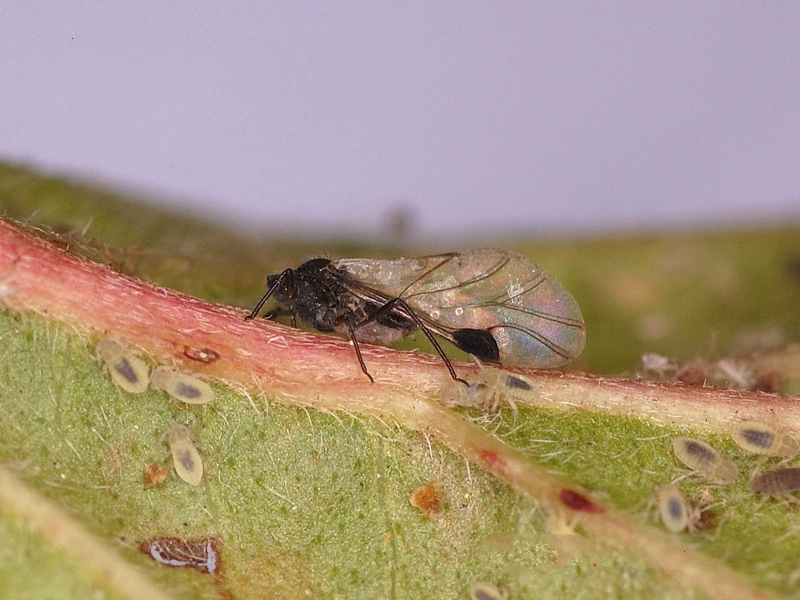

Scientific classification
- Kingdom: Animalia
- Phylum: Arthropoda
- Clade: Pancrustacea
- Class: Insecta
- Order: Hemiptera
- Suborder: Sternorrhyncha
- Family: Aphididae
- Genus: Anoecia
- Species: A. corni

Binomial name
- Anoecia corni (Fabricius, 1775)

Synonyms
- Aphis corni

= Anoecia corni =

Species of aphid

Anoecia corni, the dogwood aphid, is a species of aphid in the subfamily Anoeciinae. The species has been recorded as a pest of millets. It is native to Europe but has been introduced to North America. The fundatrices typically lay their eggs on dogwood trees, and the alate aphids fly onto grasses during the summer, where they are tended to by ants.
