= Coniesta =

Scientific classification
- Domain: Eukaryota
- Kingdom: Animalia
- Phylum: Arthropoda
- Class: Insecta
- Order: Lepidoptera
- Family: Crambidae
- Subfamily: Crambinae
- Tribe: Haimbachiini
- Genus: Coniesta; Hampson, 1919

Genus of insects

Coniesta is a genus of moths of the family Crambidae.

== Species ==
- Coniesta araealis (Hampson, 1912)
- Coniesta forsteri (Bleszynski, 1965)
- Coniesta ignefusalis (Hampson, 1919)
- Coniesta williami (de Joannis, 1927)
