= Coniesta araealis =

Scientific classification
- Kingdom: Animalia
- Phylum: Arthropoda
- Class: Insecta
- Order: Lepidoptera
- Family: Crambidae
- Subfamily: Crambinae
- Tribe: Haimbachiini
- Genus: Coniesta
- Species: C. araealis

Binomial name
- Coniesta araealis (Hampson, 1912)

Synonyms
- Chilo araealis Hampson, 1912; Haimbachia arealis Vári, Kroon & Krüger, 2002

Species of moth

Coniesta araealis is a moth in the family Crambidae. It was described by George Hampson in 1912. It is found in India.
