= Atherigona approximata =

Scientific classification
- Kingdom: Animalia
- Phylum: Arthropoda
- Clade: Pancrustacea
- Class: Insecta
- Order: Diptera
- Family: Muscidae
- Genus: Atherigona
- Species: A. approximata

Binomial name
- Atherigona approximata Malloch, 1925

Species of fly

Atherigona approximata, the pearl millet shoot fly, is a species of fly in the family Muscidae. The larvae feed on the central growing shoots of crops such as pearl millet and sorghum. It is found in South Asia.

== See also ==
- List of pearl millet diseases

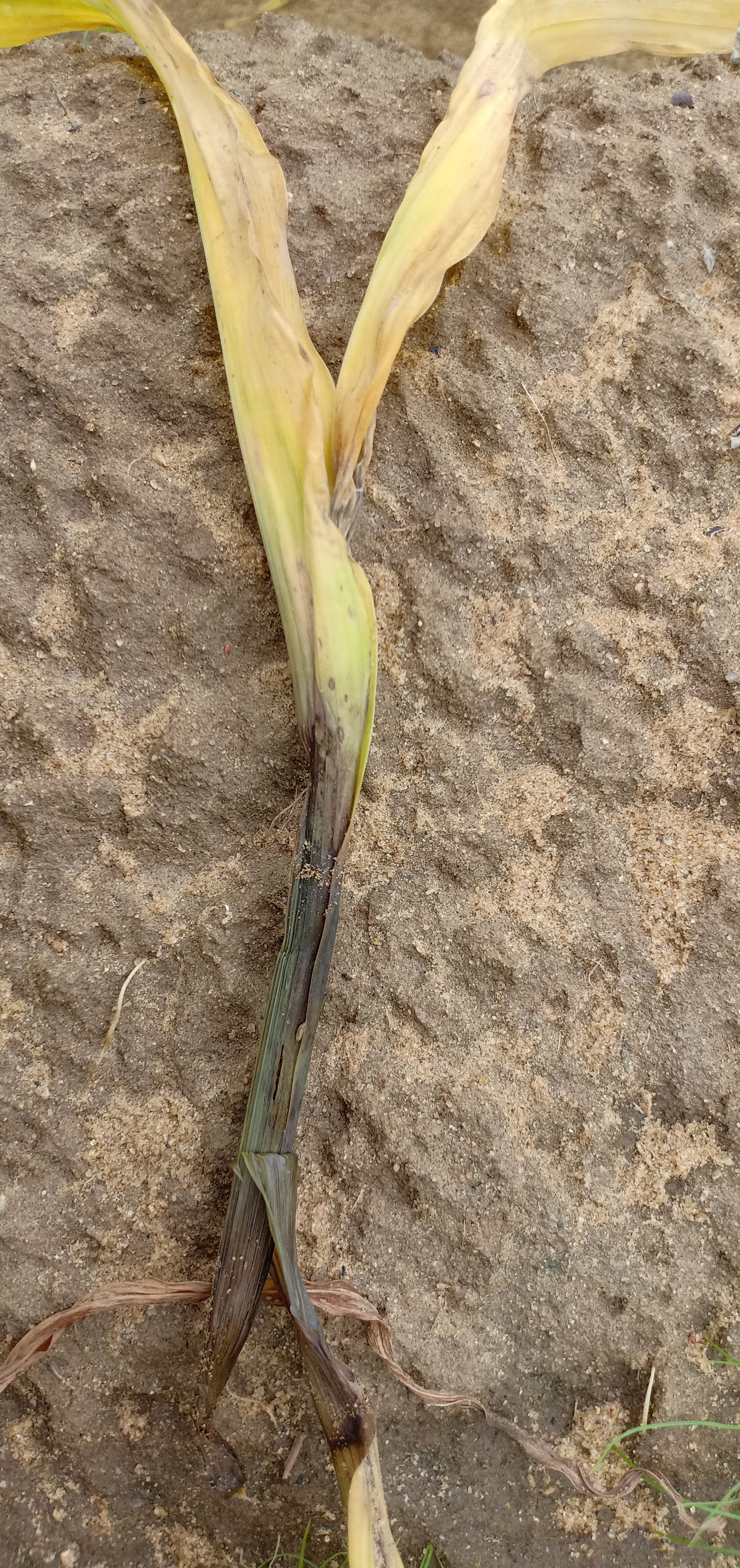
Shoot fly infested plant
