= Coniesta forsteri =

Scientific classification
- Domain: Eukaryota
- Kingdom: Animalia
- Phylum: Arthropoda
- Class: Insecta
- Order: Lepidoptera
- Family: Crambidae
- Subfamily: Crambinae
- Tribe: Haimbachiini
- Genus: Coniesta
- Species: C. forsteri

Binomial name
- Coniesta forsteri (Błeszyński, 1965)

Synonyms
- Chilo forsteri Błeszyński, 1965

Species of moth

Coniesta forsteri is a moth in the family Crambidae. It was described by Stanisław Błeszyński in 1965. It is found in Pakistan.
