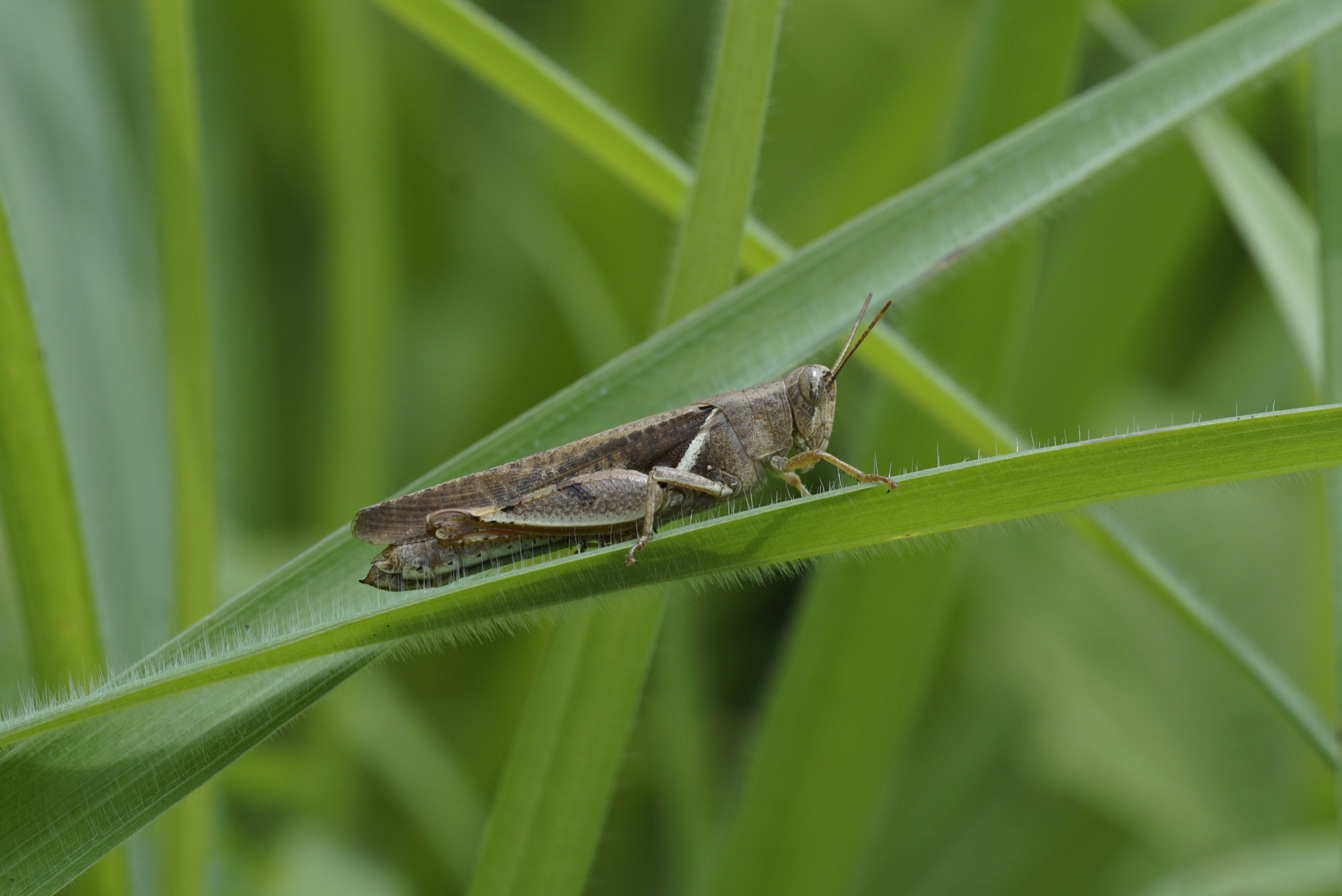

Scientific classification
- Kingdom: Animalia
- Phylum: Arthropoda
- Clade: Pancrustacea
- Class: Insecta
- Order: Orthoptera
- Suborder: Caelifera
- Family: Acrididae
- Subfamily: Catantopinae
- Tribe: Catantopini
- Genus: Diabolocatantops
- Species: D. pinguis

Binomial name
- Diabolocatantops pinguis Stål, 1861

Synonyms
- Acridium delineolatum Walker, 1870; Diabolocatantops pinguis pinguis (Stål, 1861); Acridium pingue Stål, 1861

= Diabolocatantops pinguis =

Species of grasshopper

Diabolocatantops pinguis is a species of grasshoppers in the subfamily Catantopinae and tribe Catantopini. This species can be found in the Indian subcontinent, China and Indo-China. No subspecies are listed in the Catalogue of Life.

== Gallery ==
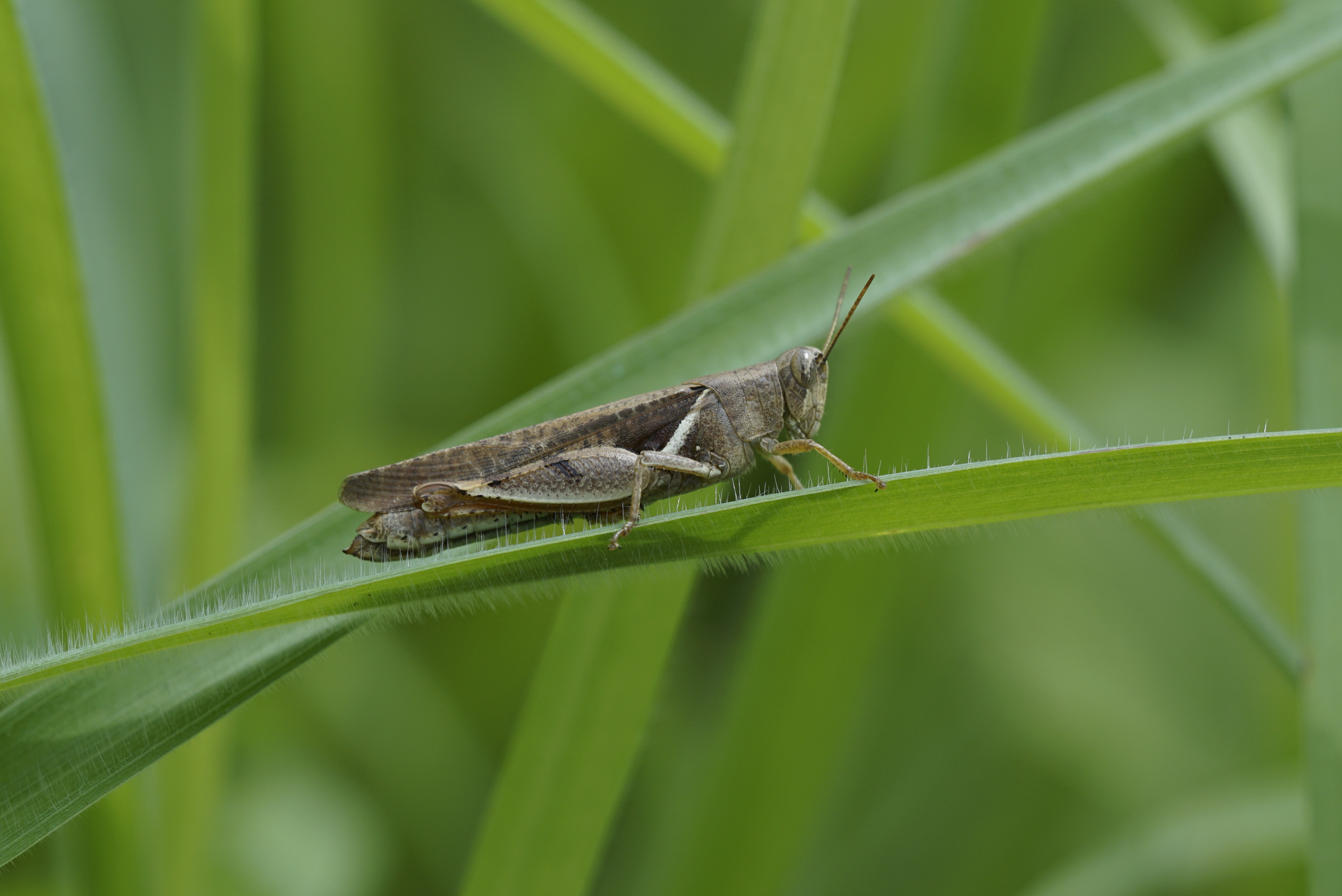

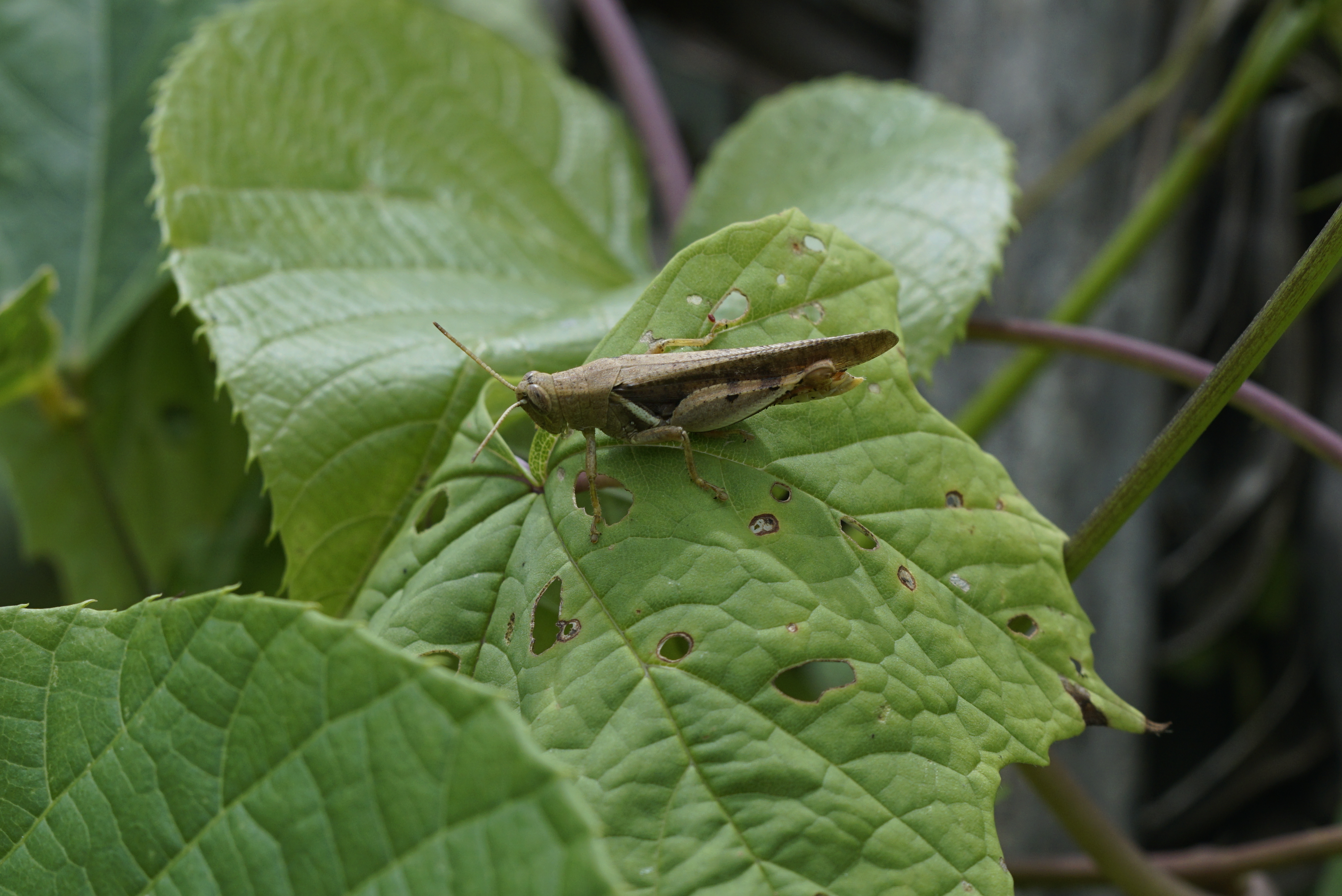

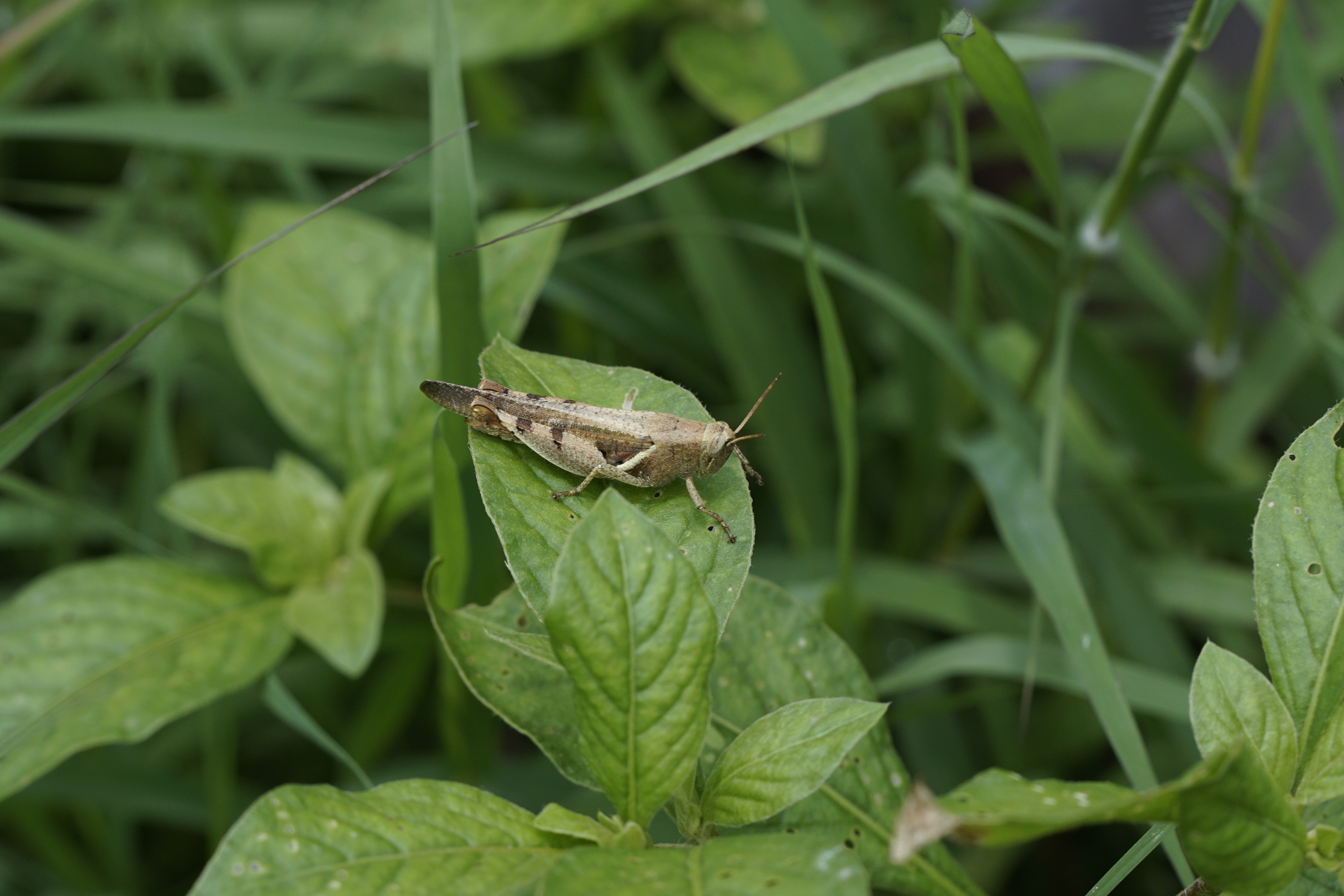
