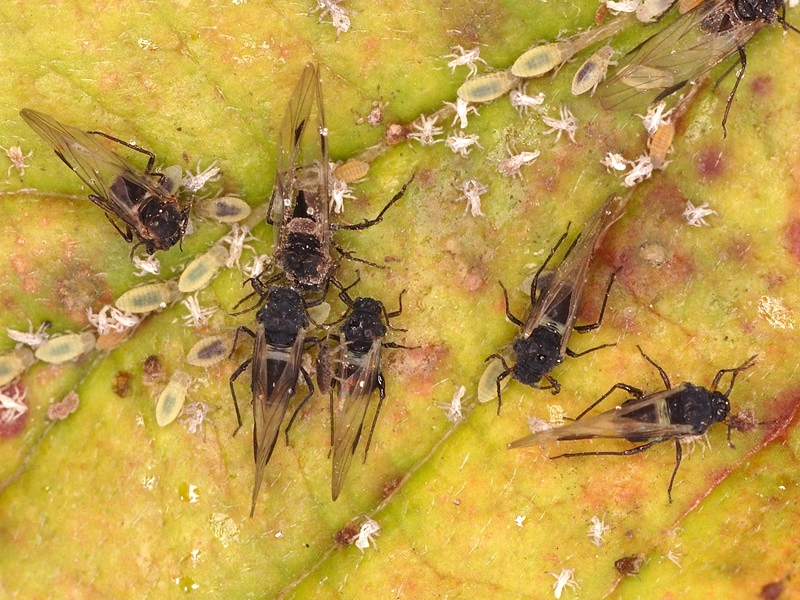
- Anoecia corni

Scientific classification
- Kingdom: Animalia
- Phylum: Arthropoda
- Class: Insecta
- Order: Hemiptera
- Suborder: Sternorrhyncha
- Family: Aphididae
- Subfamily: Anoeciinae
- Genus: Anoecia; Koch, 1857

Synonyms
- Cornifex Amyot, 1847; Neanoecia Börner, 1950; Subanoecia Börner, 1952

= Anoecia =

Genus of true bugs

Anoecia is a genus of aphids typical of the subfamily Anoeciinae.

== Species ==
Species of this genus are mostly found in Eurasia and North America.

- Anoecia caricis Mordvilko, 1931
- Anoecia corni (Fabricius, 1775)
- Anoecia cornicola (Walsh, 1863)
- Anoecia cornimaris Bozhko, 1957
- Anoecia degenerifascia Qiao & Jinyu Yang, 2008
- Anoecia equiseti Halbert, 1991
- Anoecia fulviabdominalis (Sasaki 1899)
- Anoecia furcata (Theobald, 1915)
- Anoecia graminis Gillette & M.A. Palmer, 1924
- Anoecia haupti Börner, 1950
- Anoecia himalayensis Chakrabarti, Samiran & Maity, 1978
- Anoecia ilicicola Sorin, 1999
- Anoecia japonica Sorin, 1999
- Anoecia krizusi (Börner, 1950)
- Anoecia major Börner, 1950
- Anoecia mimeuri Börner, 1950
- Anoecia mirae Narzikulov, 1968
- Anoecia oenotherae H.F. Wilson, 1911
- Anoecia panici (C.Thomas, 1878)
- Anoecia pskovica Mordvilko, 1921
- Anoecia radiciphaga Pal & D.N. Raychaudhuri, 1977
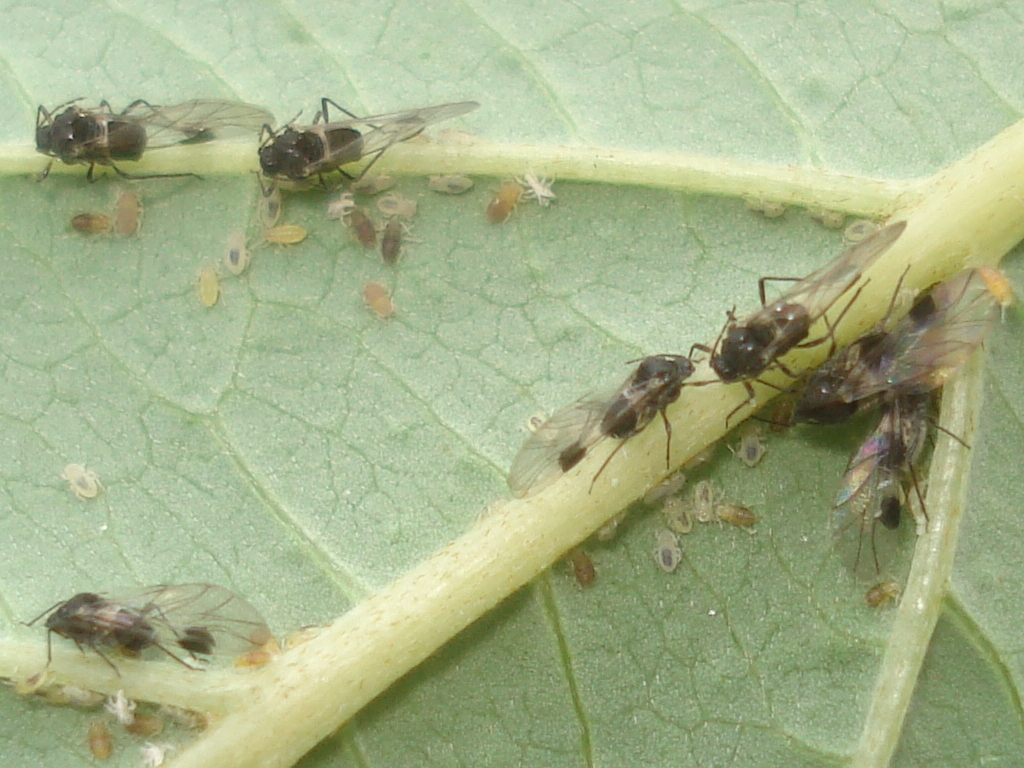
- Anoecia corni
  Anoecia setariae Gillette & M.A. Palmer, 1924
- Anoecia similiradiciphaga Qiao & Jiang, 2008
- Anoecia stipae Mamontova, 1968
- Anoecia takahashii Sorin, 1999
- Anoecia tanakai Sorin, 1999
- Anoecia vagans (C.L. Koch, 1856)
- Anoecia willcocksi F.V. Theobald, 1915
- Anoecia zirnitsi Mordvilko, 1931
