= Coniesta williami =

Scientific classification
- Domain: Eukaryota
- Kingdom: Animalia
- Phylum: Arthropoda
- Class: Insecta
- Order: Lepidoptera
- Family: Crambidae
- Subfamily: Crambinae
- Tribe: Haimbachiini
- Genus: Coniesta
- Species: C. williami

Binomial name
- Coniesta williami (de Joannis, 1927)

Synonyms
- Diatraea williami de Joannis, 1927; Chilo williami

Species of moth

Coniesta williami is a moth in the family Crambidae. It was described by Joseph de Joannis in 1927. It is found in Mozambique and Namibia.
