= Geromyia penniseti =

Scientific classification
- Kingdom: Animalia
- Phylum: Arthropoda
- Class: Insecta
- Order: Diptera
- Family: Cecidomyiidae
- Subfamily: Cecidomyiinae
- Supertribe: Cecidomyiidi
- Genus: Geromyia
- Species: G. penniseti

Binomial name
- Geromyia penniseti (Felt, 1920)

Synonyms
- Itonida penniseti Felt, 1920; Cecidomyia pennisetoides Barnes, 1956; Itonida seminis Felt, 1922; Cecidomyia penniseti Felt, 1920

Species of fly

Geromyia penniseti, the millet grain midge, is a species of gall midge in the family Cecidomyiidae. It is found in Africa and South Asia. During the rainy season, it feeds on the developing grains of pearl millet plants.
