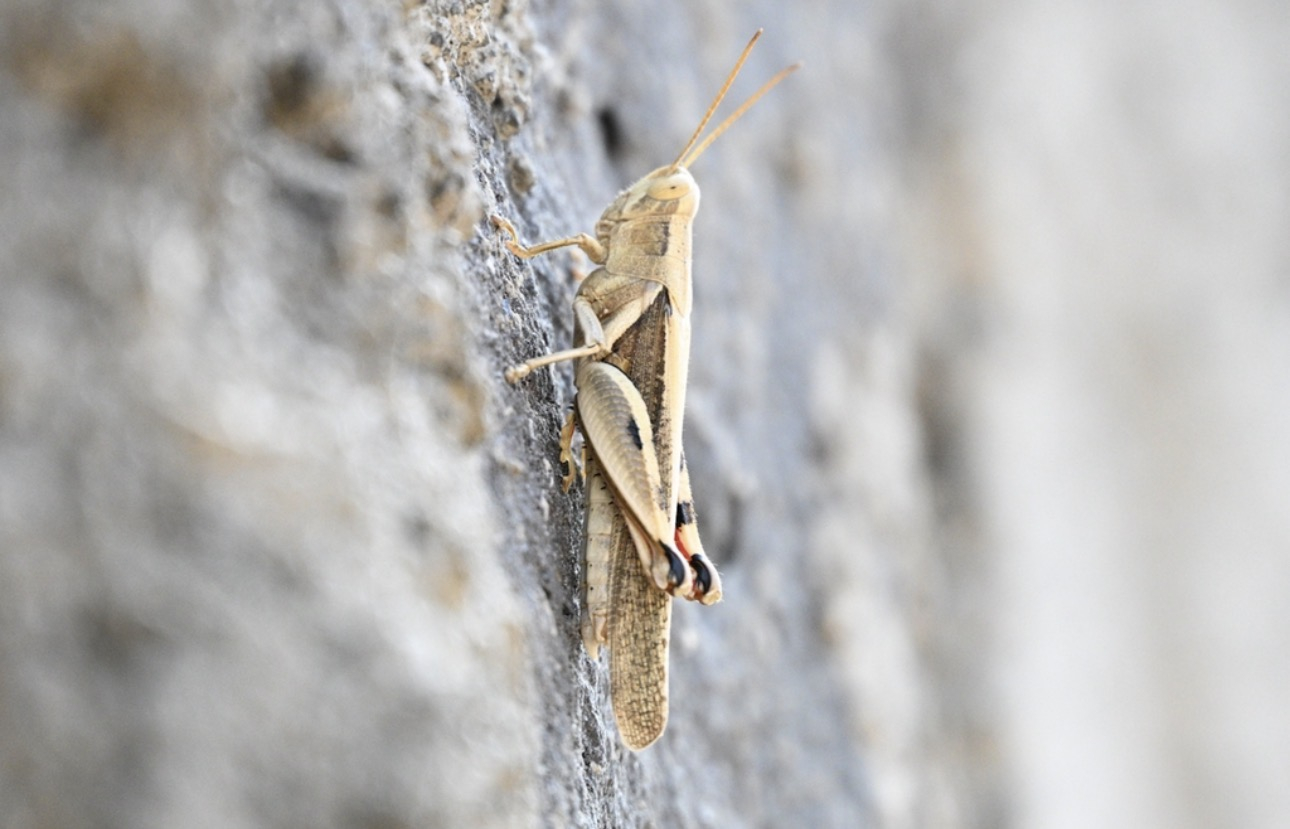
- Diabolocatantops axillaris near Cidade Velha, Cabo Verde

Scientific classification
- Kingdom: Animalia
- Phylum: Arthropoda
- Clade: Pancrustacea
- Class: Insecta
- Order: Orthoptera
- Suborder: Caelifera
- Family: Acrididae
- Subfamily: Catantopinae
- Tribe: Catantopini
- Genus: Diabolocatantops
- Species: D. axillaris

Binomial name
- Diabolocatantops axillaris (Thunberg, 1815)

Synonyms
- Gryllus axillaris Thunberg = D. a. axillaris

= Diabolocatantops axillaris =

Species of grasshopper

Diabolocatantops axillaris is a grasshopper species in the subfamily Catantopinae and tribe Catantopini. It is found in Africa. It is a pest of the pearl millet in the West African Sahel, including in Mali.
