= Coniesta ignefusalis =

Scientific classification
- Kingdom: Animalia
- Phylum: Arthropoda
- Class: Insecta
- Order: Lepidoptera
- Family: Crambidae
- Subfamily: Crambinae
- Tribe: Haimbachiini
- Genus: Coniesta
- Species: C. ignefusalis

Binomial name
- Coniesta ignefusalis (Hampson, 1919)

Synonyms
- Diatraea ignefusalis Hampson, 1919; Chilo pyrocaustalis Hampson, 1919

Species of moth

Coniesta ignefusalis, the pearl millet stem-borer, is a moth in the family Crambidae. It was described by George Hampson in 1919.

== Distribution ==
Coniesta ignefusalis is found throughout the West African Sahel, including in Senegal, Mali, Burkina Faso, Ghana, Benin, and Nigeria, where the species is known by local farmers as a major pest of grain crops.

== Crop pest ==
As a major grain crop pest in the Sahel, the larvae attack pearl millet, sorghum, and maize. It is the main pearl millet pest in Senegal. It also affects pearl millet crops in northern Mali.
