= Stenodiplosis sorghicola =

Scientific classification
- Kingdom: Animalia
- Phylum: Arthropoda
- Class: Insecta
- Order: Diptera
- Superfamily: Sciaroidea
- Family: Cecidomyiidae
- Genus: Stenodiplosis
- Species: S. sorghicola

Binomial name
- Stenodiplosis sorghicola (Coquillett, 1899)

Synonyms
- Diplosis sorghicola Coquillett, 1899; Contarinia sorghicola

Species of fly

Stenodiplosis sorghicola, the sorghum midge, is a species of gall midge in the family Cecidomyiidae. It is a pest of millets. The species is native to Africa and is also found in India. During the rainy season, it feeds on the developing grains of pearl millet plants.

It became a minor pest of grain sorghum plantations in the Northern Territory of Australia in 1969.

== Anatomy ==
The head is yellow in colour with the antennae and legs being brown . The thorax and abdomen are orange red, the wings grey hyaline. The males are shorter than the female with the former being about 1.3 mm and the latter about 1.6 mm. The two sexes can be easily differentiated by the presence of their well-developed ovipositor.
