= Amsacta moloneyi =

Scientific classification
- Kingdom: Animalia
- Phylum: Arthropoda
- Clade: Pancrustacea
- Class: Insecta
- Order: Lepidoptera
- Superfamily: Noctuoidea
- Family: Erebidae
- Subfamily: Arctiinae
- Genus: Amsacta
- Species: A. moloneyi

Binomial name
- Amsacta moloneyi Druce, 1887

Species of moth

Amsacta moloneyi is a moth of the family Erebidae. It is a species in the genus Amsacta, a genus of Tiger Moth mostly concentrated in southeastern africa, a few scattered across Asia. This specific species is most noted location is in Senegal, but also colonizes other areas of western and central Africa.

They are photophilic, meaning they’re attracted to light, like most species of moth. They eat many types of plants, but are mostly studied due to their impact on cowpea and cotton plants, being considered pests in the agricultural world. They most commonly go through one life cycle per year but have been known to potentially produce a second or even third generation depending on environmental conditions. They prefer arid conditions with a rainy season.

In northern Ghana, it has been reported as a pest of pearl millet crops.

== Phylogeny ==
Amsacta moloneyi, also known as Druce, shares a genus with 15 other species. They are in the tribe Arctiini, also known as Tiger moths. A key synapomorphy of tiger moths is a tympana which allows them to detects bat echolocation and also produce sound.

== Description ==
Larval

As a caterpillar, it’s described as hairy. It’s clear with light orange stripes and very long, white hairs all over its body.

Adult

Wings are off-white olive colored, the forewing with beige veins and the hindwing with 4 distinct dark brown spots. The femora and the costa of the wing are also a scarlet. The under abdomen and head are both off-white, the neck with a faint scarlet ring. From above, the abdomen is scarlet, the tip of the abdomen slightly darker. There are 5 elongated spots on its abdomen, the top of the abdomen also off-white.

== Life cycle ==
Variation in life cycle is dependent on genes and environmental factors but is different depending on the organism of this species. The Larval stage is about 19 days, the complete cycle lasting 30-35 days, assuming there is no diapause. However, diapause and quiescence is necessary for the development of the pupa, as there are periods on long drought in Africa. The larvae pupates around September, entering a diapause period during the dry season. It then goes into a stage of quiescence around April or May until conditions are favorable for the Adult to take flight.

Adults emerge around 3-4 days after rainfall, the rainy season effecting their emergence. This typically happens around June-July. This suggests one generation per year. Changing in rainy season could extend the time until the adult emerges until August.(French)

Adult flight normally lasts a week, but changing in rainy season has been known to effect the flight of Adults. Increased rainfall in these areas may change flight patterns, potentially extending their flight period and even allowing for a second generation in some cases. A population in New Delhi was even known to have 3 generations in one year.

== Habitat ==
Amsacta moloneyi ranges across western to central Africa, specifically studied in Senegal. Specific countries recorded include Gambia, Ghana, Ivory Coast, Chad, Nigeria, and Sudan .There is also known to be a population in New Delhi, other species from the same genus ranging throughout southern Asia and southern Africa, however, research for this specific species has been focused on their impact on agriculture in western Africa. They colonize cowpea plants, being considered pests in these areas.

The range of this species is highly dependent on the humidity of the location. Their chrysalids need arid conditions to survive, so southward expansion where there is more rain is limited. They thrive in areas with stark rainy and dry seasons.

There is also a correlation in the distribution of a population and soil type, mostly the clay content. This is due to the “hardening” effect during a drought as it’s harder for chrysalids to survive. This may also be a reason for their unlikeliness to move southward. This was observed in other similar species of moths as well, comparing the pupae survival in sandy soils versus clay soils that hardened.

Diet

Amsacta moloneyi is polyphagous, meaning it eats many types of plants including many weeds, groundnut, young millet, and most agriculturally impactful, the cowpea. What it feeds on ultimately depends on the environmental conditions at the time and what it has access to. There is also evidence that when their population is increased, they will attack cotton seedlings, specifically in Sudan.

== Pest management strategies ==
Farmers use life cycle and behavior information on species such as the Druce to know when the best time is to plant their crops and how to deal with them. Pests play a big roll in agricultural production, being identified as the second largest restraint in their production. Integrated pest management is one way of dealing with these pests, as they can form a resistance to pesticides. For example, digging out pupae before the rains can prevent adults from emerging and reproducing. This was shown to help with a related species to the Amsacta moloneyi, the Amsacta moorei. A light trap can also be set up after heavy rains, as the moths are attracted to light.
