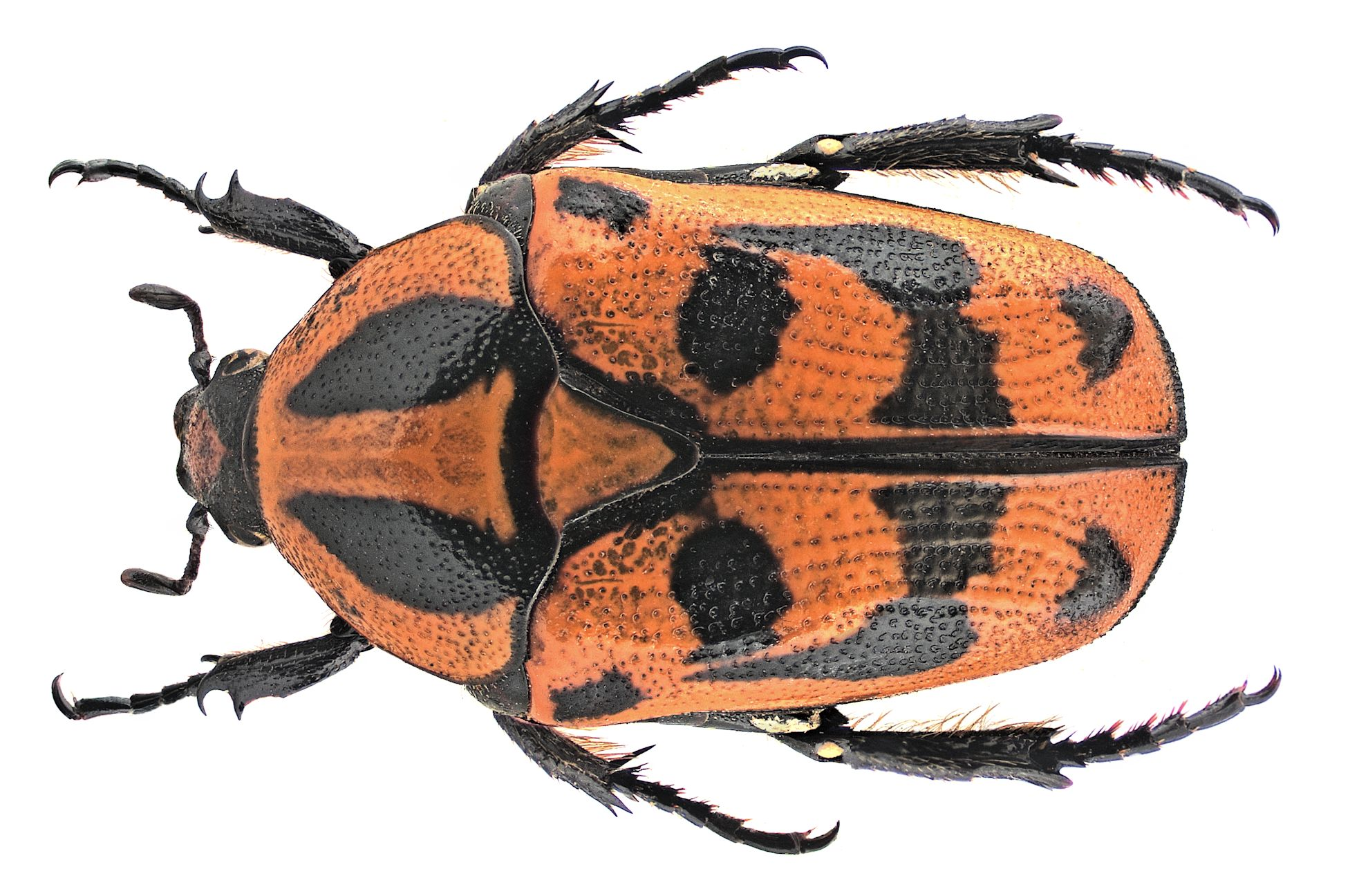
- A light colour variety, others are nearly black

Scientific classification
- Kingdom: Animalia
- Phylum: Arthropoda
- Clade: Pancrustacea
- Class: Insecta
- Order: Coleoptera
- Suborder: Polyphaga
- Infraorder: Scarabaeiformia
- Family: Scarabaeidae
- Genus: Pachnoda
- Species: P. interrupta

Binomial name
- Pachnoda interrupta (Olivier, 1789)

Synonyms
- Cetonia bipunctata Olivier, 1789; Cetonia interrupta Olivier, 1789; P. bipunctata (Olivier, 1789)

= Pachnoda interrupta =

Sorghum chafer

Species of beetle

Pachnoda interrupta, commonly known as the sorghum chafer, is a species of beetle of the family Scarabaeidae and subfamily Cetoniinae.

== Description ==
This species can reach a body length of about 11–17 millimetres (0.43–0.67 in). It is very variable in colour, from dappled yellow to black.

== Range ==
It is native to West and North Africa, and may be found from Senegal and Egypt to the lower altitudes of northern Ethiopia.

== Behaviour ==
It is a major pest of sorghum, where it attacks the grains during the milky stage. It is also a pest on pearl millet and maize, and at times they consume the flowers of cotton and citrus species. Fertile humus and moist light soil in the shade of forest trees or riparian vegetation are potential breeding and hibernating areas for the beetles. They are prone to outbreaks, when they also acquire new breeding areas. Adults form aggregations during the mating period in July, and again in October. They aggregate at their food sources, such as Acacia trees or on sorghum seeds, to feed and mate. During the mating season, males are only attracted to unmated females, which suggests the presence of a female-emitted sex pheromone. Their aggregation behavior consequently appears to be guided by a combination of pheromone and host volatiles.

== Reproduction ==
A female can oviposition an average of 1.3 eggs per day for a period of 11 days. The eggs generally hatch within 4 to 22 days (mean of 15.7 days) with a mean larval stage of 60 days, and a mean pupal stage of 18 days. The oviposition rate is highest during the first four days after mating, and may continue to the eleventh day.

== Control ==
Methyl salicylate applied to cotton, or eugenol and isoamyl acetate on rubber septa have been shown to be attractive lures in traps. Beetle traps placed outside the sorghum fields are significantly more effective than those placed inside the fields.
