= Puccinia substriata var. indica =

Scientific classification
- Kingdom: Fungi
- Division: Basidiomycota
- Class: Pucciniomycetes
- Order: Pucciniales
- Family: Pucciniaceae
- Genus: Puccinia
- Species: P. substriata
- Variety: P. s. var. indica

Trinomial name
- Puccinia substriata var. indica Thüm., (1879)

Variety of fungus

Puccinia substriata var. indica is a plant pathogen infecting pearl millet.
