= Dactuliophora elongata =

Scientific classification
- Kingdom: Fungi
- Division: Ascomycota
- Class: Dothideomycetes
- Order: Pleosporales
- Family: incertae sedis
- Genus: Dactuliophora
- Species: D. elongata

Binomial name
- Dactuliophora elongata C.L. Leakey (1964)

Species of fungus

Dactuliophora elongata is an ascomycete fungus that is a plant pathogen.
