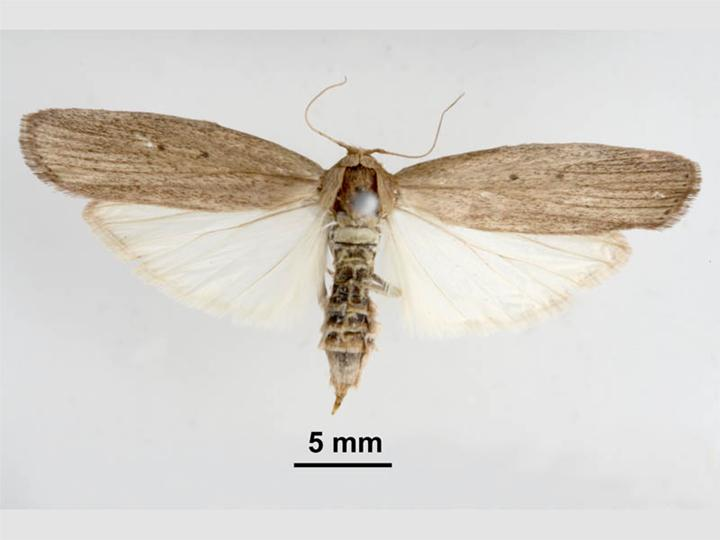
- Dorsal view
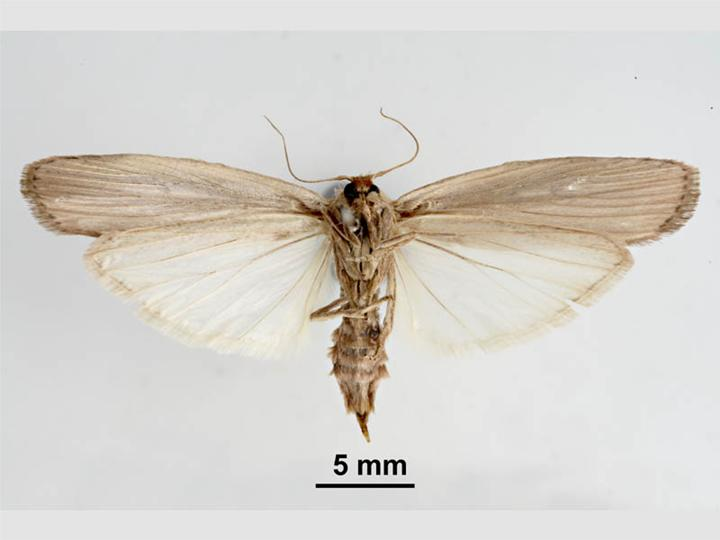
- Ventral view

Scientific classification
- Kingdom: Animalia
- Phylum: Arthropoda
- Clade: Pancrustacea
- Class: Insecta
- Order: Lepidoptera
- Family: Pyralidae
- Genus: Eldana; Walker, 1865
- Species: E. saccharina

Binomial name
- Eldana saccharina Walker, 1865

Synonyms
- Ancylosidia Strand, 1913; Ancylosidia conipyga Strand, 1913

= Eldana =

Genus of moths

Eldana is a genus of moths of the family Pyralidae containing only one species, the African sugar-cane borer (Eldana saccharina), which is commonly found in Equatorial Guinea, Ghana, Mozambique, Sierra Leone and South Africa. Adults have a wingspan of 35mm. This species is particularly relevant to humans because the larvae are a pest of the Saccharum species as well as several grain crops such as sorghum and maize. Other recorded host plants are cassava, rice and Cyperus species. When attacking these crops, E. saccharina bores into the stems of their host plant, causing severe damage to the crop. This behavior is the origin of the E. saccharrina's common name, the African sugar-cane borer. The African sugar-cane borer is a resilient pest, as it can survive crop burnings. Other methods such as intercropping and parasitic wasps have been employed to prevent further damage to crops.

== Taxonomy ==
The only member of the genus Eldana, E. saccharina was described by Francis Walker in 1865. It is of the family Pyralidae of the order Lepidoptera and has eleven subspecies. The common name of E. saccharina, the African sugar-cane borer, is derived from its activity as a pest in stretches of sub-Saharan Africa.

== Description ==
Adult African sugar-cane borers are relatively small with a 3mm abdomen width. They have a wingspan of 35mm. The forewings are pale brown with two distinct dark brown spots in the center. The hindwings are a whitish brown and contain short fringes and brown longitudinal veins. Both male and female African sugar-cane borers share the same appearance, but females are slightly larger. When resting, E. saccharina folds its wings over its abdomen so that its fore wings are parallel to and cover the white hindwings.

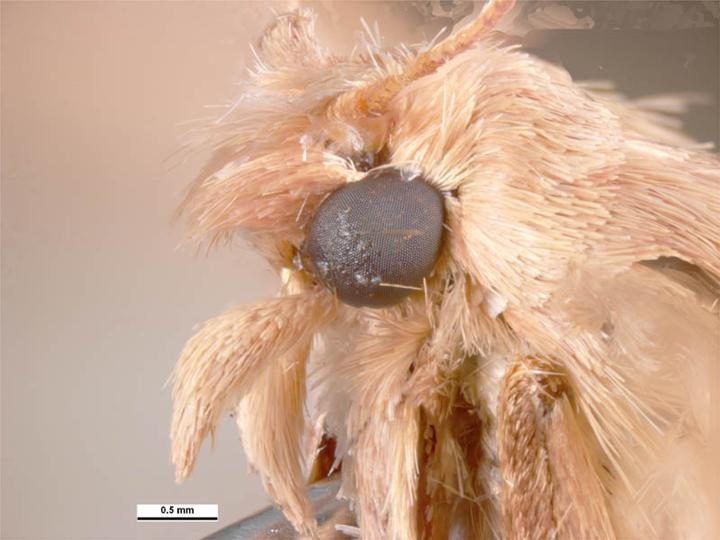
Close-up of the head

== Distribution and habitat ==
E. saccharina is indigenous to Africa and is widely distributed throughout sub-Saharan Africa. It can be found in Equatorial Guinea, Ghana, Mozambique, Sierra Leone and South Africa. There are also populations of the African sugar-cane borer in stretches of northern Africa, in particular Ethiopia and parts of Senegal. Colder temperatures limit E. saccharina's range in these areas of Africa. However, in the Congo-Uganda border, geological events have extended these ranges. There are crater lakes and swamps that are the result of volcanic eruptions, which have been found to contain populations of E.saccharina. E. saccharina primarily lives in sedges and wild grasses among riverine vegetation. However, recently, the African sugar-cane borers have been found to extend their home ranges to graminaceous crops, particularly in eastern and southern Africa. There is also a relationship between soil parent material and existence of the African sugar-cane borer. The species is less prevalent in areas with sandier soils.

== Food resources ==
=== Host plants ===
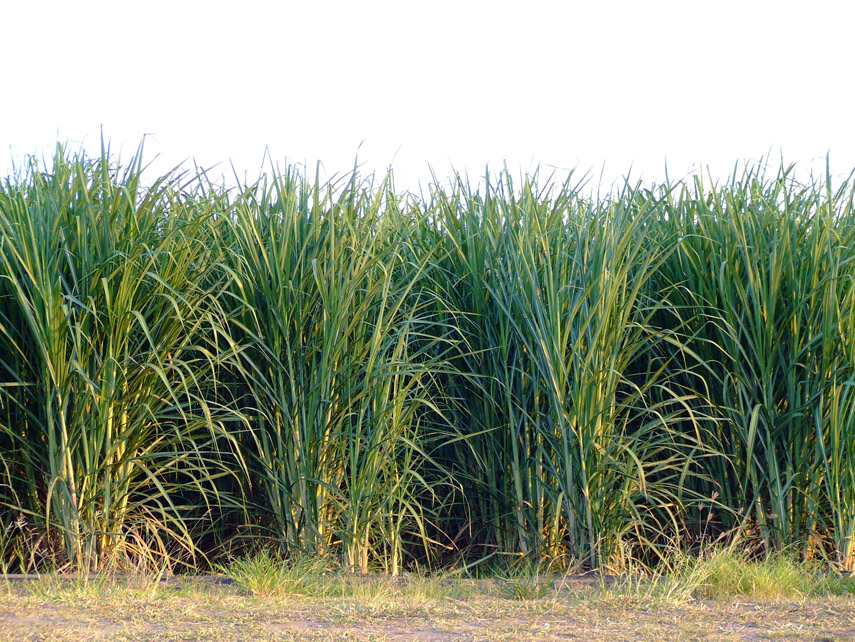
Rows of sugarcane, the most common host plant for E. saccharina

Sugarcane is the main host plant for E. saccharina. This is also the source of the species' common name, the African sugar-cane borer. It will also attack maize, sorghum, cassava, rice, and Cyperus species, and it has also been found to host wild grasses like Guinea grass, wetland sedges like papyrus, rushes, and typha. Various signs indicate the presence of E. saccharina in its host plants. Primarily presence can be determined by stem tunneling and other signs of breakage in plant stems. Infestations of sugarcane can also result in yield losses.

== Parental care ==
=== Oviposition ===
Oviposition is the act of depositing eggs. Female African sugar-cane borers prefer to deposit eggs onto dry or dead leaf material. Kairomones, which are semiochemicals emitted by an organism to mediate interspecific interactions, are found in the dead leaves and attract the females to oviposit. In addition to targeting dead leaves, female E. saccharina conceal their eggs between leaf surfaces in tight bunches of around 300 eggs.

== Social behavior ==
=== Communication ===
Communication between E.saccharina is both complex and little understood. Like other moth species, African sugar-cane borers communicate using ultrasound emitted from the tymbal, a sound producing membrane commonly found in insect species. Males producing ultrasound vibrations induce a wing-flapping behavior in females, and the signal also functions as a sign of aggression towards other males. When males approach other males, they circle each other while emitting bursts of sound, and eventually one overwhelms the other during the interaction, chasing it away. When males approach females, females either walk past or produce their own sounds. If females reply to the male signal, males will then contact their hair-pencils onto female antennae. These male to female communication behaviors are distinct from mating rituals.

== Life cycle ==
=== Egg ===
The yellow oval eggs are deposited in groups of 250 to 500 onto the inner side of leaf sheaths, structures that tightly wrap near stems, allowing them to fit snugly into the plant stalks. After being laid, eggs typically require 5–7 days of incubation before hatching.

=== Larva ===
African sugar-cane borer larvae appearance range from a light brown to dark grey. They have a distinct brown plate on the dorsal side of their thoraxes, and average larval duration is 31 days. Larvae spread from their hatching site after 1–3 days. When they encounter predators, larvae excrete brownish liquid from their mouths, which deters predation. After hatching, larvae feed on external surfaces of plants before tunneling into stems where they pupate. This behavior is the source of E. saccharina's common name, the African sugar-cane borer.

=== Pupa ===
Pupation is the third stage of moth development during which moths undergo transformation from immature to mature stages. During this time, pupae undergo developmental stages known as instars. Pupae of E. saccharina can be found tunneled inside host plants. They reside very close, often only 5 centimeters, to the exit hole, which is visible on the plant surface. African sugar-cane borers typically pupate for 7–13 days before emerging from the exit hole. While they are tunneled into the plant, pupae are very resistant to human attempts of removal. They can even survive crop burnings.

=== Adult ===
Adult African sugar-cane borers emerge from exit holes in their host plants. Adults usually emerge after a rapid drop in temperature, after which they climb vertically and spread their wings. After 10–15 minutes of setting their new wings, newly emerged adults only survive for 6–13 days, during which females spend two days in pre-oviposition and have a 4-day reproductive life. Due to there short lifespan, it is likely that females only mate once.

== Enemies ==
=== Predators ===
Like other moths, African sugar-cane borers experience the greatest levels of mortality during the egg and larval life cycles. Several species of ants and mites have been established as egg predators of E. saccharina. In particular Pheidole, a species of small ants are well-suited to reaching African sugar-cane borer eggs, which are commonly hidden in tight spaces behind leaf sheaths. Mite egg predators are less understood but pose a large problem for E.saccharina due to their small size and abundance in habitats where African sugar-cane borers live. Larger, more aggressive ants like Dorylus as well as some spiders are common predators for African sugar-cane borer larvae. Larval predators often attack young, dispersing larvae or those that have not penetrated into host plant stalks.

=== Parasites ===
There have been several parasites found that target E. saccharina larvae. These include:

- Agathis sp. (Hymenoptera: Braconidae)
- Chriodes sp. (Hymenoptera: Ichneumonidae)
- Schembria sp. (Diptera: Tachinidae)
- Goniozus natalensis (Hymenoptera: Bethylidae)

Of these, G. natalensis is the most significant, because it is the main parasite that affects the African sugar-cane borer. It has been found to attack fourth, fifth, and sixth instar pupae. G. natalensis are attracted to the bore holes left by E. saccharina, and after entering, sting the larva, temporarily paralyzing it and allowing for oviposition. Ovipositing G. natalensis preferentially target female African sugar-cane borer larvae, and their eggs hatch after three days of incubation and proceed to consume the E. saccharina larvae.

== Mating ==
=== Displaying ===
Displaying is a set of courtship behaviors, which are used by an organism to attract potential mates. After emerging, adult males will set their wings and after 30 minutes will begin to display to females. There, they face downwards and beat their wings rapidly. Males tend to aggregate into groups of 3–6 on the same plant to make it easier for females to locate them. This behavior can continue for anywhere between 15 and 20 minutes. During this period, males can either remain stationary or move slightly before restarting the beating. Females, when present, also begin a similar wing-flapping behavior. However, this behavior occurs regardless of female presence and releases both an attractant pheromone and an aphrodisiac to entice faraway females. Since the African sugar-cane borer is very sensitive to temperature, male mating behaviors have been found to stop when conditions are below 15 degree Celsius.

=== Courting ===
African sugar-cane borer courting has only been documented once in the wild. After encountering a female, a male African sugar-cane borer will face the female with extended antennae. The two will then rotate in a circle with the male following the female, which signals her interest with spread wings. Following the circling, males will then climb onto females and have the tip of their abdomens meet the females. The males will then grip the females' thorax and can copulate for up to three hours. During this time, the pairs will move to lower vegetation as females are particularly vulnerable during copulation.

=== Pheromones ===
African sugar-cane borer males secrete pheromones by wing glands and abdominal hair-pencils to attract females. The gas chromatography-mass spectrometry (GC-MC) analysis showed one major volatile component. This compound was identified to be trans-3-methyl-4-dimethylallyl-𝛾-lactone (C_{10}H_{16}O_{2}).

== Interactions with humans ==
=== Pests of crop plants ===
The African sugar-cane borer larvae enter mature target plants through cracks or openings in the stalk. They have been found to survive crop burnings while bored into the base of the plant and will later emerge as soon as new, young plant shoots appear. Infestations of E.saccharina are more commonly found in intensively grown sugarcane than in peasant-grown fields. This is due to higher levels of nitrogen and water-stress in plants, which is particularly problematic since many industrial fertilizers contain nitrogen.

==== Pre-trashing ====
Since African sugar-cane borers, are known to lay eggs specifically in dry leaf material, farmers developed a simple yet effective technique known as pre-trashing. Pre-trashing involves the preemptive removal of dry or dead leaf material from sugarcane field that do not have existing populations of E.saccharina. Not only does this technique prevent African sugar-cane borers from laying eggs and populating new fields, but also any undetected eggs, already present, would be moved too far from the cane stalk for larvae traverse the distance. This technique, however, does have some drawbacks, since pre-trashing does cause irreversible damage to growing plants and reduces crop yield.

==== Intercropping and host plant breeding ====
A common method to combat E. saccharina is to intercrop target plants with non-host plants. These trap plants attract female African sugar-cane borers to oviposit where eggs often develop poorly or not at all. In addition to using existing plant species, researchers have been attempting to develop new plants such as sugarcane that are resistant to pests that often attack and damage them. One such sugarcane plant with resistance to E. saccharina was developed, but it was found that the plant was suddenly attacked and damaged by another organism, C. sacchariphagus, and when resistant to the latter, it was attacked by the former organism.

==== Biopesticide ====
Other biological methods have also been employed against E. saccharina. Two parasitic wasps, Cotesia flavipes and Xanthopimpla stemmator, attack African sugar-cane borer larvae by parasitizing them. When hatched, the larvae of these wasps consume the pest larvae. This method is particularly useful for targeting larvae that have already bored into the host plant and are normally very difficult to reach.

==== Silicon treatment ====
In many plant species, it has been found that applied silicon can enhance a plant species' resistance to pests because it increases silicon deposition in epidermal cells. This increases plant hardness and reduces digestibility. Studies have shown that this is particularly true for the African sugarcane borer, as sugarcane treated with silicon lead to decreased larval penetration and mass gain. Additionally, pests found feeding on silicon treated plants suffer from reduced food intake, survival, and population growth. In potted sugarcane plants, silicon treatment has been found to not only reduce pest damage but also enhance plant tolerance of water-stress. However, these studies did not mention how silicon treatment affected the viability of the sugarcane as a product.
