= Heliocheilus albipunctella =

Scientific classification
- Domain: Eukaryota
- Kingdom: Animalia
- Phylum: Arthropoda
- Class: Insecta
- Order: Lepidoptera
- Superfamily: Noctuoidea
- Family: Noctuidae
- Genus: Heliocheilus
- Species: H. albipunctella

Binomial name
- Heliocheilus albipunctella (de Joannis, 1925)

Synonyms
- Raghuva albipunctella de Joannis, 1925

Species of moth

Heliocheilus albipunctella, the millet head miner moth, is a moth in the family Noctuidae. It is found in the Sahelian region of West Africa.
