= Rhinyptia infuscata =

Scientific classification
- Kingdom: Animalia
- Phylum: Arthropoda
- Clade: Pancrustacea
- Class: Insecta
- Order: Coleoptera
- Suborder: Polyphaga
- Infraorder: Scarabaeiformia
- Family: Scarabaeidae
- Genus: Rhinyptia
- Species: R. infuscata

Binomial name
- Rhinyptia infuscata Burmeister, 1844

Species of beetle

Rhinyptia infuscata is a species of scarab beetle. It is a pest of the millet plant in Africa. The Rhinyptia infuscata is often blamed for flower abortions, smoke and chemical treatments for plants are used against the beetle.

== Appearance ==
The adult measures roughly 8-10mm. They are a dark yellow colour, sometimes brown.

== Behaviour ==
Adults are generally nocturnal, emerging at night to feed on plants, often in numerous numbers.
