= Poophilus costalis =

Scientific classification
- Kingdom: Animalia
- Phylum: Arthropoda
- Class: Insecta
- Order: Hemiptera
- Suborder: Auchenorrhyncha
- Family: Aphrophoridae
- Genus: Poophilus
- Species: P. costalis

Binomial name
- Poophilus costalis (Walker, 1851)

Species of true bug

Poophilus costalis is a species of true bug in the family Aphrophoridae. It is a pest of millets in West Africa.
