= Psalydolytta vestita =

Scientific classification
- Kingdom: Animalia
- Phylum: Arthropoda
- Class: Insecta
- Order: Coleoptera
- Suborder: Polyphaga
- Infraorder: Cucujiformia
- Family: Meloidae
- Genus: Psalydolytta
- Species: P. vestita

Binomial name
- Psalydolytta vestita (Dufour, 1821)

Species of beetle

Psalydolytta vestita is a species of blister beetle. It is a pest of millets in Africa.
