= Anoeciinae =

Scientific classification
- Kingdom: Animalia
- Phylum: Arthropoda
- Class: Insecta
- Order: Hemiptera
- Suborder: Sternorrhyncha
- Family: Aphididae
- Subfamily: Anoeciinae

Subfamily of true bugs

Anoeciinae is a subfamily of the family Aphididae. Anoeciines live underground and feed on the roots of plants.

== Genera ==
These four genera belong to the subfamily Anoeciinae:

- Anoecia Koch, 1857
- Krikoanoecia Zhang & Qiao, 1996
- † Berendtaphis Heie, 1971
- † Bolshayanoecia Heie, 1989
