= Blackburneus richteri =

Scientific classification
- Kingdom: Animalia
- Phylum: Arthropoda
- Clade: Pancrustacea
- Class: Insecta
- Order: Coleoptera
- Suborder: Polyphaga
- Infraorder: Scarabaeiformia
- Family: Scarabaeidae
- Genus: Blackburneus
- Species: B. richteri

Binomial name
- Blackburneus richteri (Schmidt, 1910)

Synonyms
- Aphodius richteri Schmidt, 1910

Species of beetle

Blackburneus richteri is a species of beetle of the family Scarabaeidae. It is found in Argentina, Bolivia, Brazil (Distrito Federal, Maranhão, Mato Grosso do Sul) and Paraguay.

== Description ==
Adults reach a length of about 2.5–3 mm (0.098–0.118 in). The body is shagreened and testaceous. The head has moderated punctures, becoming progressively larger near the frons. The pronotum is densely covered with fine and coarse punctures. The elytra have convex interstriae, with a singe row of punctures.

== Life history ==
Specimens have been collected in pastures of Urochloa brizantha and Urochloa decumbens and in areas of native Cerrado at altitudes up to 1600 metres. They are attracted to cattle dung.
