= Blackburneus thomasi =

Scientific classification
- Kingdom: Animalia
- Phylum: Arthropoda
- Clade: Pancrustacea
- Class: Insecta
- Order: Coleoptera
- Suborder: Polyphaga
- Infraorder: Scarabaeiformia
- Family: Scarabaeidae
- Genus: Blackburneus
- Species: B. thomasi

Binomial name
- Blackburneus thomasi Dellacasa, Dellacasa & Gordon, 2011

Species of beetle

Blackburneus thomasi is a species of beetle of the family Scarabaeidae. It is found in Bolivia and Brazil (Distrito Federal, Mato Grosso do Sul).

== Description ==
Adults reach a length of about 2–2.5 mm (0.079–0.098 in). The body is oval, shagreened and testaceous. The clypeus has punctures of similar sizes and equidistant. The pronotum has punctures of two sizes: fine punctures spread throughout the pronotal surface, equidistant on the disc, and closer near the lateral margins. Coarse punctures are absent on the pronotal disc, and closer near the lateral margins. The elytra are shagreened, with the interstriae convex and with two rows of fine punctures.

== Life history ==
Specimens have been collected in cattle dung in pastures of Urochloa brizantha and Urochloa decumbens.
