= Blackburneus furcatus =

Scientific classification
- Kingdom: Animalia
- Phylum: Arthropoda
- Clade: Pancrustacea
- Class: Insecta
- Order: Coleoptera
- Suborder: Polyphaga
- Infraorder: Scarabaeiformia
- Family: Scarabaeidae
- Genus: Blackburneus
- Species: B. furcatus

Binomial name
- Blackburneus furcatus (Schmidt, 1909)

Synonyms
- Aphodius furcatus Schmidt, 1909

Species of beetle

Blackburneus furcatus is a species of beetle of the family Scarabaeidae. It is found in Argentina, Bolivia, Brazil (Distrito Federal, Mato Grosso, Mato Grosso do Sul, Minas Gerais, Pará), Panama, Paraguay and Venezuela.

== Description ==
Adults reach a length of about 2.5–3 mm (0.098–0.118 in). The head, up to the frontoclypeal suture, with fine punctation. There are coarse punctures, but these are restricted to the frons. The pronotum has punctures of two sizes: small punctures distributed throughout the pronotal surface and large punctures concentrated near the lateral margins. The elytral interstriae are shagreened and flat, as well as finely punctate.

== Life history ==
Specimens have been collected at altitudes up to 1000 meters. Some were collected in Urochloa brizantha and Urochloa decumbens pastures in bovine dung.
