= Blackburneus argentinensis =

Scientific classification
- Kingdom: Animalia
- Phylum: Arthropoda
- Clade: Pancrustacea
- Class: Insecta
- Order: Coleoptera
- Suborder: Polyphaga
- Infraorder: Scarabaeiformia
- Family: Scarabaeidae
- Genus: Blackburneus
- Species: B. argentinensis

Binomial name
- Blackburneus argentinensis (Schmidt, 1909)

Synonyms
- Aphodius argentinensis Schmidt, 1909

Species of beetle

Blackburneus argentinensis is a species of beetle of the family Scarabaeidae. It is found in Argentina, Brazil (Mato Grosso do Sul), French Guiana, Paraguay and Uruguay.

== Description ==
Adults reach a length of about 4–4.5 mm (0.16–0.18 in). The body is wide and reddish testaceous. The head has sparse punctures. Those on the clypeus are sparse and almost imperceptibly small, while the frons has coarse punctures. The pronotum has punctures of two sizes, the large punctures are scattered, and closer near the lateral margins. The elytra are shagreened, with the interstriae flat, and with two rows of small punctures. The interstria near the elytral suture are darker than the others and the fifth interstria, from the elytral suture, is wider than the rest near the anterior margin of the elytra.

== Life history ==
Specimens have been collected at altitudes ranging from 250 to 1100 metres, within feces of Guzera cattle droppings in pastures of Urochloa decumbens.
