= Aidophus infuscatopennis =

Scientific classification
- Kingdom: Animalia
- Phylum: Arthropoda
- Clade: Pancrustacea
- Class: Insecta
- Order: Coleoptera
- Suborder: Polyphaga
- Infraorder: Scarabaeiformia
- Family: Scarabaeidae
- Genus: Aidophus
- Species: A. infuscatopennis

Binomial name
- Aidophus infuscatopennis (Schmidt, 1909)

Synonyms
- Aphodius infuscatopennis Schmidt, 1909; Aphodius (Aidophus) paraguayanus Balthasar, 1963

Species of beetle

Aidophus infuscatopennis is a species of beetle of the family Scarabaeidae. It is found in Argentina, Bolivia, Brazil (Mato Grosso do Sul, Rio Grande do Sul), Paraguay, Peru and Uruguay.

== Description ==
Adults reach a length of about 3–4 mm (0.12–0.16 in). The head is punctate and visibly downward bent, at least anteriorly. The clypeus is emarginate, with the margin rounded. It is convex and subrugosely granulate. The frons has larger and more evident punctures. The pronotum has punctures of two sizes. The punctures are scarce near the lateral margins. The elytra are shagreened, with the interstriae flat and with scarce and fine punctation.

== Life history ==
Specimens have been collected in pastures of Urochloa decumbens, inside bovine faecal masses.
