= Aidophus kolbei =

Scientific classification
- Kingdom: Animalia
- Phylum: Arthropoda
- Clade: Pancrustacea
- Class: Insecta
- Order: Coleoptera
- Suborder: Polyphaga
- Infraorder: Scarabaeiformia
- Family: Scarabaeidae
- Genus: Aidophus
- Species: A. kolbei

Binomial name
- Aidophus kolbei (Schmidt, 1910)

Synonyms
- Didactylia kolbei Schmidt, 1910

Species of beetle

Aidophus kolbei is a species of beetle of the family Scarabaeidae. It is found in Bolivia, Brazil (Mato Grosso) and Uruguay.

== Description ==
Adults reach a length of about 3–3.5 mm (0.12–0.14 in). The head has a sinuate clypeus, and is punctate with fine and spaced punctures. The frons has punctures larger than those of the clypeus. The pronotum has punctures of different sizes, larger punctures are more concentrated laterally. The posterior angles are obtuse. The elytra are microreticulate and the interstriae are flat with small and spaced punctures.

== Life history ==
Specimens have been collected in pastures of sandy soil.
