= Blackburneus caracaensis =

Scientific classification
- Kingdom: Animalia
- Phylum: Arthropoda
- Clade: Pancrustacea
- Class: Insecta
- Order: Coleoptera
- Suborder: Polyphaga
- Infraorder: Scarabaeiformia
- Family: Scarabaeidae
- Genus: Blackburneus
- Species: B. caracaensis

Binomial name
- Blackburneus caracaensis (Petrovitz, 1970)

Synonyms
- Aphodius (Blackburneus) caracaensis Petrovitz, 1970; Aphodius (Blackburneus) brasilicola Balthasar, 1971

Species of beetle

Blackburneus caracaensis is a species of beetle of the family Scarabaeidae. It is found in Argentina, Brazil (Bahia, Distrito Federal, Mato Grosso, Minas Gerais, Santa Catarina) and Paraguay.

== Description ==
Adults reach a length of about 2.5–3 mm (0.098–0.118 in). The body is brown. The head is entirely punctate with moderate sized punctures. The punctures on the frons are no bigger than those of the clypeus. The pronotum has moderate and large punctures. The moderate punctures are evenly spread across the pronotal surface, while the large punctures are scarce on the pronotal disc and near the posterior margin, and closely grouped near the lateral margins. The elytral interstriae are finely punctate and microreticulate, with the microreticulation stronger closer to the posterior margins.

== Life history ==
Specimens have been collected at altitudes ranging from 800 to 1380 metres above sea level.
