= Blackburneus indio =

Scientific classification
- Kingdom: Animalia
- Phylum: Arthropoda
- Clade: Pancrustacea
- Class: Insecta
- Order: Coleoptera
- Suborder: Polyphaga
- Infraorder: Scarabaeiformia
- Family: Scarabaeidae
- Genus: Blackburneus
- Species: B. indio

Binomial name
- Blackburneus indio (Petrovitz, 1973)

Synonyms
- Aphodius indio Petrovitz, 1973

Species of beetle

Blackburneus indio is a species of beetle of the family Scarabaeidae. It is found in Brazil (Distrito Federal, Goiás, Mato Grosso, Mato Grosso do Sul, Minas Gerais).

== Description ==
Adults reach a length of about 3.5–4.5 mm (0.14–0.18 in). The body is elongate, sub-parallel-sided, and brown with the anterior and lateral margins of the head and pronotum lighter. The clypeus is sinuate, and medially weakly convex. The pronotum is punctate with punctures of two sizes: coarse punctures near the lateral margins and small punctures present everywhere. The elytra are shagreened and the interstriae have two rows of small punctures.

== Life history ==
Specimens have been collected at altitudes up to 980 metres. They are attracted to feces of elephant, cattle and Tapirus.
