= Blackburneus amazonicus =

Scientific classification
- Kingdom: Animalia
- Phylum: Arthropoda
- Clade: Pancrustacea
- Class: Insecta
- Order: Coleoptera
- Suborder: Polyphaga
- Infraorder: Scarabaeiformia
- Family: Scarabaeidae
- Genus: Blackburneus
- Species: B. amazonicus

Binomial name
- Blackburneus amazonicus Dellacasa, Dellacasa & Gordon, 2011

Species of beetle

Blackburneus amazonicus is a species of beetle of the family Scarabaeidae. It is found in Brazil (Acre, Amapá, Amazonas, Mato Grosso, Pará, Rondônia, Roraima), French Guiana and Suriname.

== Description ==
Adults reach a length of about 3–3.5 mm (0.12–0.14 in). The body is light to dark red. The head has punctures of two sizes, fine punctures distributed everywhere and coarser punctures present on the frons, and sometimes also on the clypeus near the frontoclypeal suture. The clypeus is not sinuate and weakly gibbous. The pronotum has a line of coarse punctures at the posterior margin and angles. The interstriae of disc of the elytra are flat.

== Life history ==
Specimens have been collected on human or pig feces from regions of mature tropical forests, secondary and logging forests.
