= Urochloa deflexa =

Scientific classification
- Kingdom: Plantae
- Clade: Tracheophytes
- Clade: Angiosperms
- Clade: Monocots
- Clade: Commelinids
- Order: Poales
- Family: Poaceae
- Subfamily: Panicoideae
- Genus: Urochloa
- Species: U. deflexa

Binomial name
- Urochloa deflexa (Schumach.) H.Scholz

Synonyms
- Brachiaria deflexa (Schumach) C.E.Hubbard; Panicum deflexum Schumach.; Panicum ramosum var. deflexum (Schumach.) Peter; Pseudobrachiaria deflexa (Schumach.) Launert

Species of grass

Urochloa deflexa, commonly known as Guinea millet, is an annual millet grass belonging to the grass family (Poaceae). It is native to many regions such as Africa, India, and Pakistan in both tropical and subtropical regions. It has been used as a supplemental food source among other cereal crops.

== Description ==
Urochloa deflexa is an annual grass that grows up to 70 cm tall. It has weak and slender stems that are finely pubescent. The stem extends into roots at the lower nodes. Leaves alternate across the stem and are a linear-lanceolate shape with a pale leaf sheath. Inflorescence imitates a panicle with 7-15 racemes on a 6 cm-15 cm long axis. These racemes are 2 cm-20 cm long, broadly elliptical (2mm-3.5mm), and have spikelets up to 15mm long. It matures in 90–130 days and flowers throughout the year.

Urochloa deflexa is a C4 species, which is advantageous in its dry and often highly sunlit conditions.

== Geographic distribution and growth ==
Guinea millet is believed to have originated in the African savanna in the Fouta Djallon plateau of northwestern Guinea. It can be found in Northern Africa from Senegal to Ethiopia and in Southern African in both Maputaland and Limpopo. Guinea millet appears in Southern Asia along the northern regions of India in Uttar Pradesh and Punjab. Later, it also appeared in southern India in Tamil Nadu, indicating new distribution patterns. All of these regions generally have arid climates in addition to tropical areas.

Guinea millet can grow in a variety of conditions but generally prefers shady conditions with well-drained soil for best growth. This grass is considered to be drought-resistant. It prefers to be along the edge of floodplains and pans where it is temporarily wet and is frequently found as a short grass among tall trees.

== Phylogeny ==
Guinea millet belongs to the family Poaceae which contains species of small-millets that are renowned for their nutritional value and resilience to climate. Guinea millet demonstrates physiological traits common in the Poaceae family in its ability to survive in harsh climates, such as heat and drought, as well as being relatively unaffected by pathogens and insects.

Within the genus Urochloa, Guinea millet is easily distinguished from other species due to its inflorescence's distinct panicle shape. However, Guinea millet can be confused with fonio (Digitaria exilis), which is also of the Poaceae family. Guinea millet has larger grains and faster growing rate than fonio, but it also requires good drainage and soil fertility to grow.

Guinea millet can also be differentiated from other species of grasses with morphological analysis of its starch granules. It produces exclusively round granules and have a differing texture when compared with other Poaceae species.

== Uses ==
Guinea millet is a grain that has been used for centuries as a grain in times of famine. In Ancient Africa, people of the Songhai Empire (modern day Mali) and the Bambara Empire (modern day Mali) would consume this grass and called it “paguiri” and “yaqué yaqué” respectively. In modern Sahel, it is harvested by local populations and nomadic tribes as a supplemental food source.

Small millets of the Poaceae family are resilient and nutritious. Guinea millet and other small grains are as much as five-sevenfold better in terms of proteins, vitamins, fiber, and other macro- and micro- compounds. In addition, it has strong agronomic qualities such as not requiring much irrigation or pesticide use which make it easy to cultivate and manage. Thus, small millets are optimal to address food insecurity and its use as a substitute for larger grains (e.g. Rice and Wheat) are being studied.

== Conservation ==
Guinea millet can degrade crop lands and thus efforts have been made to develop methods to prevent abundant grass growth. Cowpea studies have shown that a combination of hand-weeding and herbicide use is effective in controlling Guinea millet populations. Study indicated that Urochloa deflexa occupied over 14% of the grassy weeds among crop populations, as compared with 13% Euphorbia heterophylla and 0.8% Vernonia galamensis, demonstrating the pervasiveness of this grass.
