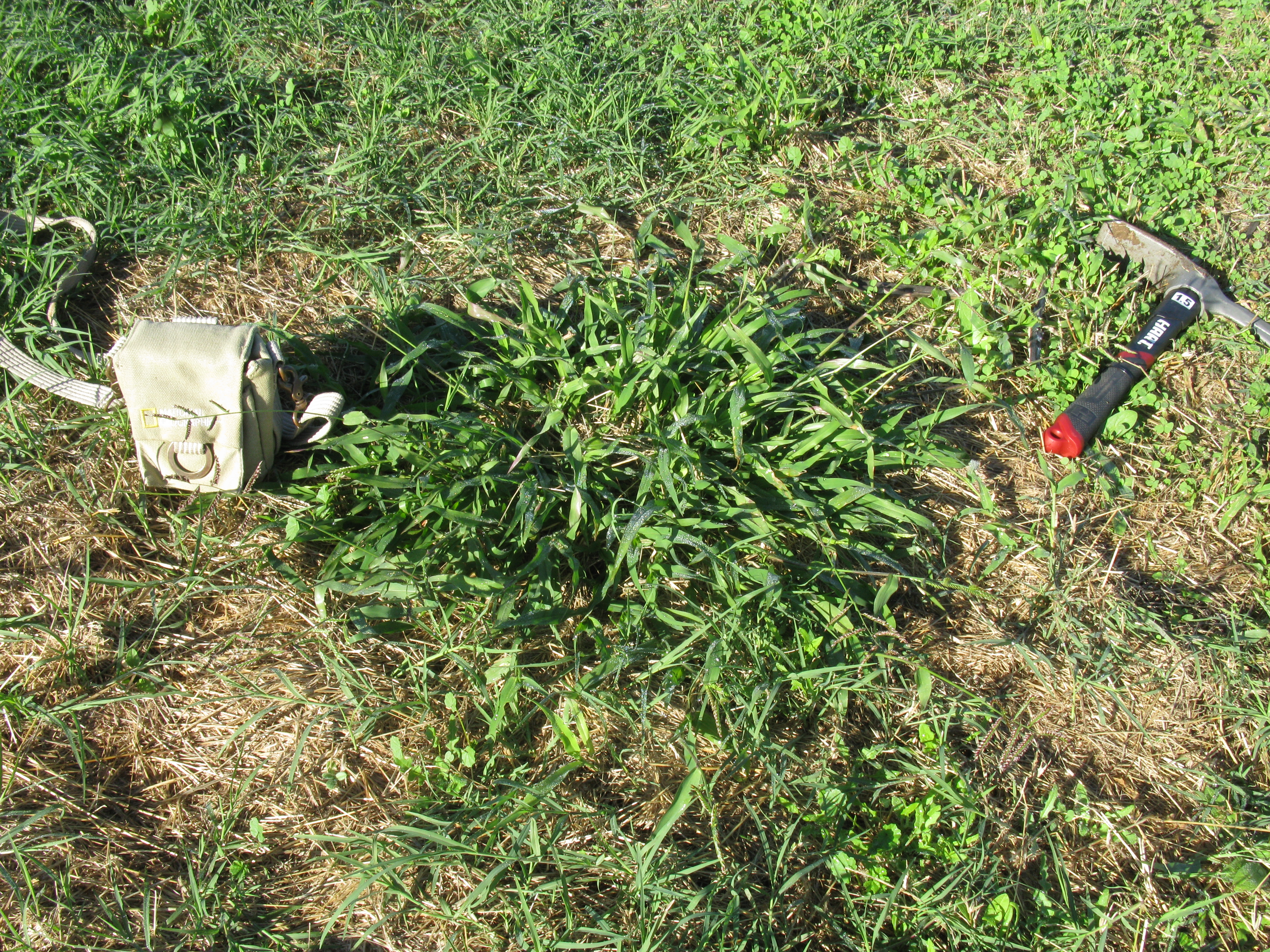
- Urochloa trichopus (formerly Urochloa mosambicensis)

Scientific classification
- Kingdom: Plantae
- Clade: Tracheophytes
- Clade: Angiosperms
- Clade: Monocots
- Clade: Commelinids
- Order: Poales
- Family: Poaceae
- Subfamily: Panicoideae
- Genus: Urochloa
- Species: U. trichopus

Binomial name
- Urochloa trichopus (Hochst.) Stapf

Synonyms
- List: Brachiaria stolonifera Gooss. in Bull. Misc. Inform. Kew 1934: 195 (1934); Echinochloa notabilis (Hook.f.) D.Rhind in Grasses Burma: 50 (1945); Eriochloa trichopus (Hochst.) Benth. in J. Linn. Soc., Bot. 19: 89 (1881); Eriochloa trichopus var. glabrata Schweinf. in Bull. Herb. Boissier 2(App. 2): 17 (1894); Helopus trichopus (Hochst.) Steud. in Syn. Pl. Glumac. 1: 100 (1854); Panicum dorsisetum Hack. in T.A.Durand & H.Schinz, Consp. Fl. Afric. 5: 748 (1894), nom. nud.; Panicum mosambicense Hack. in Bol. Soc. Brot. 6: 140 (1888); Panicum notabile Hook.f. in Fl. Brit. India 7: 32 (1896); Panicum papillosum Fenzl ex Steud. in Syn. Pl. Glumac. 1: 100 (1854), pro syn.; Panicum trichopodon A.Rich. in Tent. Fl. Abyss. 2: 369 (1850), nom. superfl.; Panicum trichopus Hochst. in Flora 27: 254 (1844); Panicum trichopus var. chiovendae Lanza & Mattei in Boll. Reale Orto Bot. Palermo 9: 46 (1910); Panicum trichopus var. lasiostachys A.Chev. in Sudania 1: 34, 146, 159 (1911), nom. nud.; Urochloa brachyphylla Gilli in Ann. Naturhist. Mus. Wien 69: 40 (1966); Urochloa engleri Pilg. in Notizbl. Bot. Gart. Berlin-Dahlem 15: 450 (1941); Urochloa mosambicensis (Hack.) Dandy in J. Bot. 69: 54 (1931); Urochloa pullulans Stapf in D.Oliver & auct. suc. (eds.), Fl. Trop. Afr. 9: 590 (1920), nom. superfl.; Urochloa pullulans var. mosambicensis (Hack.) Stapf in D.Oliver & auct. suc. (eds.), Fl. Trop. Afr. 9: 592 (1920); Urochloa rhodesiensis Stent in Proc. & Trans. Rhodesia Sci. Assoc. 32: 26 (1933); Urochloa stolonifera (Gooss.) Chippind. in D.B.D.Meredith, Grass. Past. S. Africa: 381 (1955)

= Urochloa trichopus =

Species of plant

Urochloa trichopus, bushveld signal grass is a species of grass that is native to tropical and southern parts of Africa, Arabian Peninsula and western Madagascar.

== Description ==
It is clump-forming grass that can grow up to 1.7 m (5 ft 6.9 in) meters tall, with alternate spaced leaves. The leaf sheath is glabrous (hairless) to slightly pubescent (having small hairs). The leaf blade is linear, acuminate (tapering to a long point) and 5–30 mm (0.2–1.2 in) long and 5–20 mm (0.2–0.8 in) wide. The flower consists of 3–20 racemes carried on a central axis 4–20 cm (1.6–7.9 in) long. They are solitary, ovate shaped spikelets on a narrowly winged rachis (shaft). They are 2-flowered with lower floret male and upper bisexual. They have 3 stamens. The ovary has 2 plumose (having feathers or featherlike growths) stigmas. The seed capsule is a strongly flattened caryopsis (grain). It flowers and fruits between June and August.

== Distribution ==
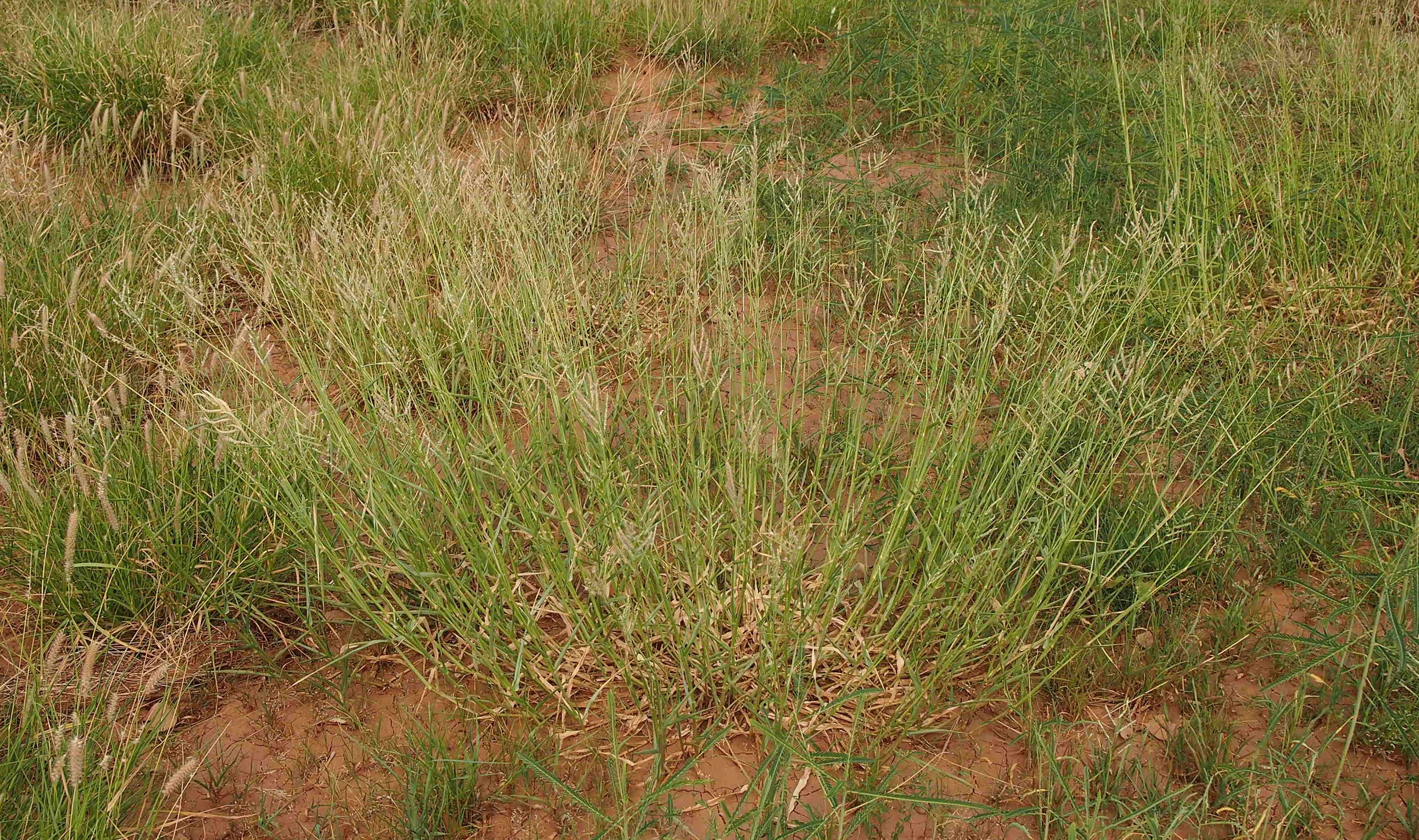
Clump of Urochloa trichopus (formerly Urochloa mosambicensis)

It is native to the African countries of Angola, Botswana, Burkina, Cameroon, Chad, Congo, Eritrea, Ethiopia, Ivory Coast, Kenya, Malawi, Mali, Mauritania, Mozambique, Namibia (and Caprivi Strip), Niger, Nigeria, Senegal, Somalia, South Africa (within the Cape Provinces, Free State, KwaZulu-Natal and the Northern Provinces), Sudan, Swaziland, Tanzania, Uganda, Zambia, Zaïre and Zimbabwe. In Arabia it is found in Saudi Arabia and Yemen.

It has been found in Telangana state, India in 2021.

It is found at an altitude of up to 1,500 m (4,900 ft) above sea level, in semi-arid climates, in grassland and savanna woodland. It is also found in disturbed locations and as an arable weed.

== Taxonomy ==
It was previously known as Urochloa mosambicensis (with common names of sabi grass and gonya grass). Urochloa trichopus

It was first published and described as Urochloa pullulans in D.Oliver & auct. suc. (eds.), Fl. Trop. Afr. vol.9 on page 589 in 1920, before later being called Urochloa trichopus.

It is class as Least Concern on the Red List of South African Plants.

== Uses ==
The seed of Urochloa trichopus can be gathered for food, such as in Kordofan (Sudan), Tanzania, Botswana and Zimbabwe. While, in Botswana it is ground into a flour, which can then be as a cereal, which can be mixed with water, milk or melon juice and made into cake.

It is as good fodder in India.
