= Aidophus parcus =

Scientific classification
- Kingdom: Animalia
- Phylum: Arthropoda
- Clade: Pancrustacea
- Class: Insecta
- Order: Coleoptera
- Suborder: Polyphaga
- Infraorder: Scarabaeiformia
- Family: Scarabaeidae
- Tribe: Aphodiini
- Genus: Aidophus
- Species: A. parcus

Binomial name
- Aidophus parcus (Horn, 1887)

Synonyms
- Aphodius parcus Horn, 1887; Aphodius kansanus Wickham, 1905; Aphodius knausii Fall, 1905; Aphodius wolcotti Blatchley, 1910

Species of beetle

Aidophus parcus is a species of aphodiine dung beetle in the family Scarabaeidae. It is found in the United States (Florida, Indiana, Kansas, Maryland, Michigan, Mississippi, Nebraska, New Jersey, New Mexico, Oklahoma, Texas, Wisconsin).

== Description ==
Adults reach a length of about 3–4 mm (0.12–0.16 in). They have a shortly oblong, moderately convex, subshiny, glabrous, pale yellowish-testaceous body. The head is partly reddish-brown and the pronotum is darkened on the disc and has a lateral brownish spot at middle of each side. The elytral suture is reddish-brown and the legs are testaceous. The antennal club is yellowish.

== Life history ==
Specimens have been collected in sand dune areas. They are thought to feed on detritus.
