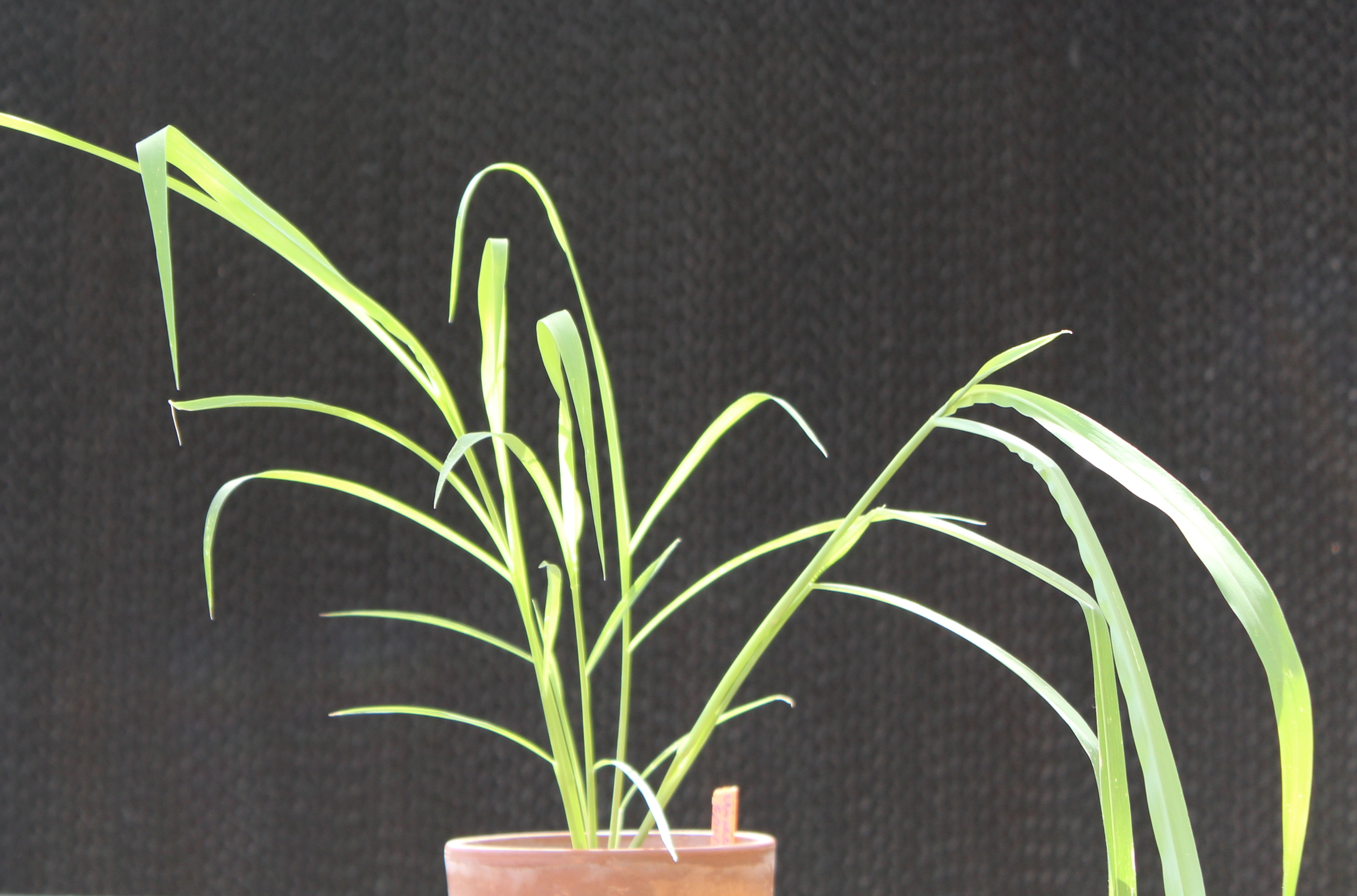

Scientific classification
- Kingdom: Plantae
- Clade: Tracheophytes
- Clade: Angiosperms
- Clade: Monocots
- Clade: Commelinids
- Order: Poales
- Family: Poaceae
- Subfamily: Panicoideae
- Genus: Urochloa
- Species: U. fusca

Binomial name
- Urochloa fusca B.F. Hansen & Wunderlin

Synonyms
- Brachiaria fasciculata Panicum fasciculatum Urochloa fasciculata

= Urochloa fusca =

Species of grass

Urochloa fusca, the browntop signalgrass, is a wild grass species with a native range extending from Paraguay in South America to the southern United States (Alabama, Arizona, Florida, Georgia, New Mexico, Texas, and Oklahoma), and it is now found as a weed in Australia. The species is diploid, with a base chromosome number of 9, and utilizes the PCK enzymatic subtype of C4 photosynthesis. Based on a molecular phylogeny of the genus Urochloa, the closest relatives of U. fusca are Urochloa arizonica and Urochloa mollis The genome of U. fusca is currently being sequenced by the Joint Genome Institute.

== Ecology ==
Prefers moist and the disturbed areas at low elevations.
