= Blackburneus strandi =

Scientific classification
- Kingdom: Animalia
- Phylum: Arthropoda
- Clade: Pancrustacea
- Class: Insecta
- Order: Coleoptera
- Suborder: Polyphaga
- Infraorder: Scarabaeiformia
- Family: Scarabaeidae
- Genus: Blackburneus
- Species: B. strandi

Binomial name
- Blackburneus strandi (Balthasar, 1935)

Synonyms
- Aphodius (Koshantschikovius) strandi Balthasar, 1935

Species of beetle

Blackburneus strandi is a species of beetle of the family Scarabaeidae. It is found in India (Chhattisgarh, Jharkhand).

== Description ==
Adults reach a length of about 5 mm (0.20 in). They have a glabrous body, with the head and pronotum glossy and the elytra weakly glossy. They are light brown, with the back of the head and the disc of the pronotum darker.
