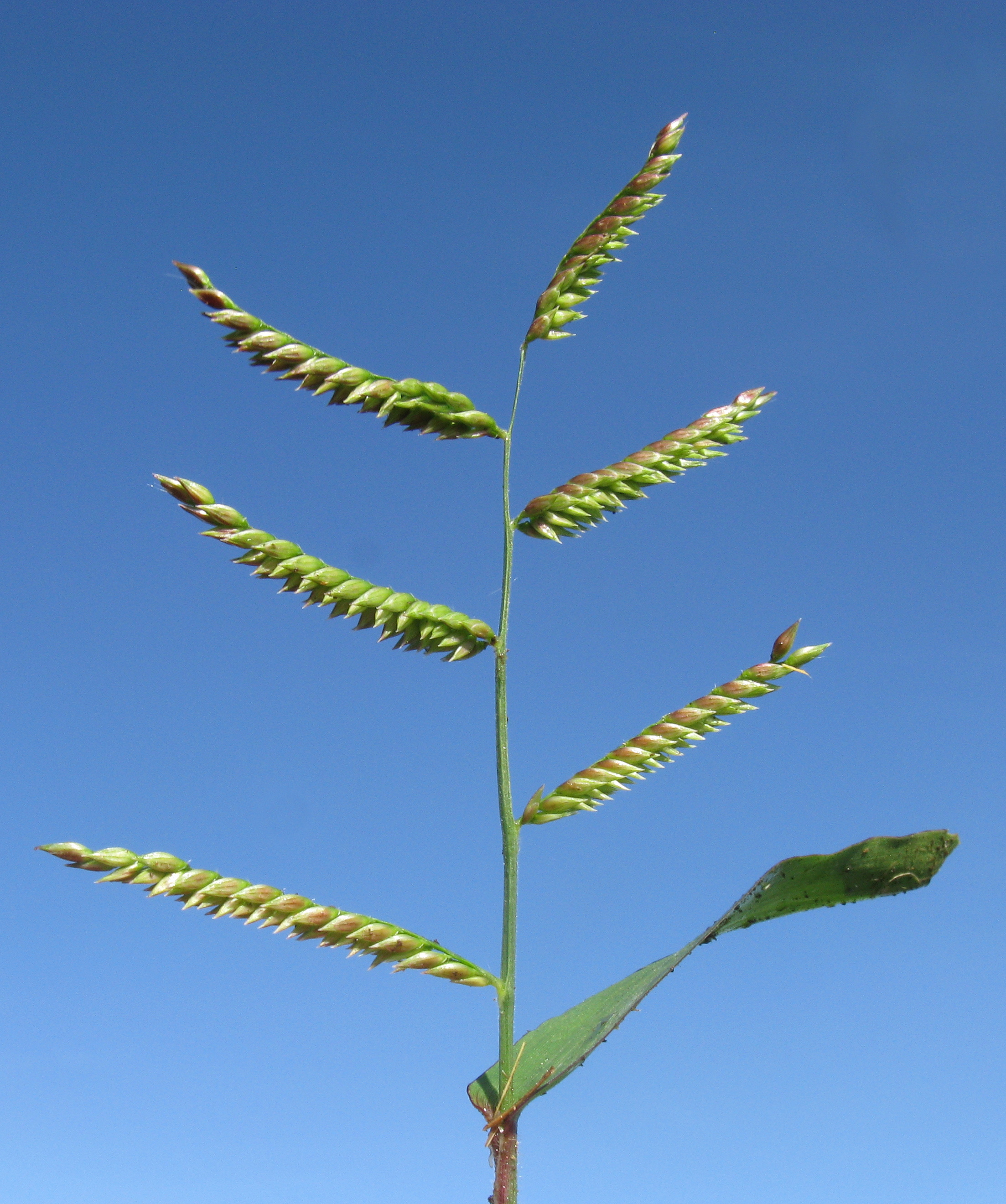
- Urochloa mosambicensis

Scientific classification
- Kingdom: Plantae
- Clade: Tracheophytes
- Clade: Angiosperms
- Clade: Monocots
- Clade: Commelinids
- Order: Poales
- Family: Poaceae
- Subfamily: Panicoideae
- Supertribe: Panicodae
- Tribe: Paniceae
- Subtribe: Melinidinae
- Genus: Urochloa; P.Beauv.

Type species
- Urochloa panicoides P.Beauv.

Synonyms
- Brachiaria (Trin.) Griseb. in C.F.von Ledebour, Fl. Ross. 4: 469 (1853); Leucophrys Rendle in W.P.Hiern, Cat. Afr. Pl. 2: 193 (1899); Pseudobrachiaria Launert in Mitt. Bot. Staatssamml. München 8: 158 (1970)

= Urochloa =

Signalgrass

Genus of grasses

Urochloa, commonly known as signalgrass, is a genus of plants in the grass family, native to tropical and subtropical regions of Eurasia, Africa, Australia, the Americas, and various islands.

Several species of the genus Urochloa are cultivated as forage and some species of were probably first introduced unintentionally to the Americas in the colonial period, from slave ships. Urochloa eminii was introduced to Brazil in 1952. Urochloa is the most widely used tropical grass in Central and South America, with about 40 million hectares planted in Brazil alone.

== Biology ==
This genus was described in 1812. It is similar to the genus Panicum, and some authors believe Panicum is ancestral to it. A phylogenetic analysis concluded that species of the former genus Brachiaria formed a monophyletic group with those of Urochloa, along with the genera Eriochloa and Melinis, and that further molecular and morphological work is needed to establish clear relationships.

Urochloa species are annual or perennial grasses, most lacking rhizomes. The inflorescence is a branching panicle, and the plant reaches about a meter in height. The plants are bisexual and the flowers are fleshy, with 3 anthers. Some species have a prominent vein in the center of the leaf. Brachiaria are C_{4} species and can tolerate drier conditions and more light exposure than some other plants.

== Ecology and conservation ==
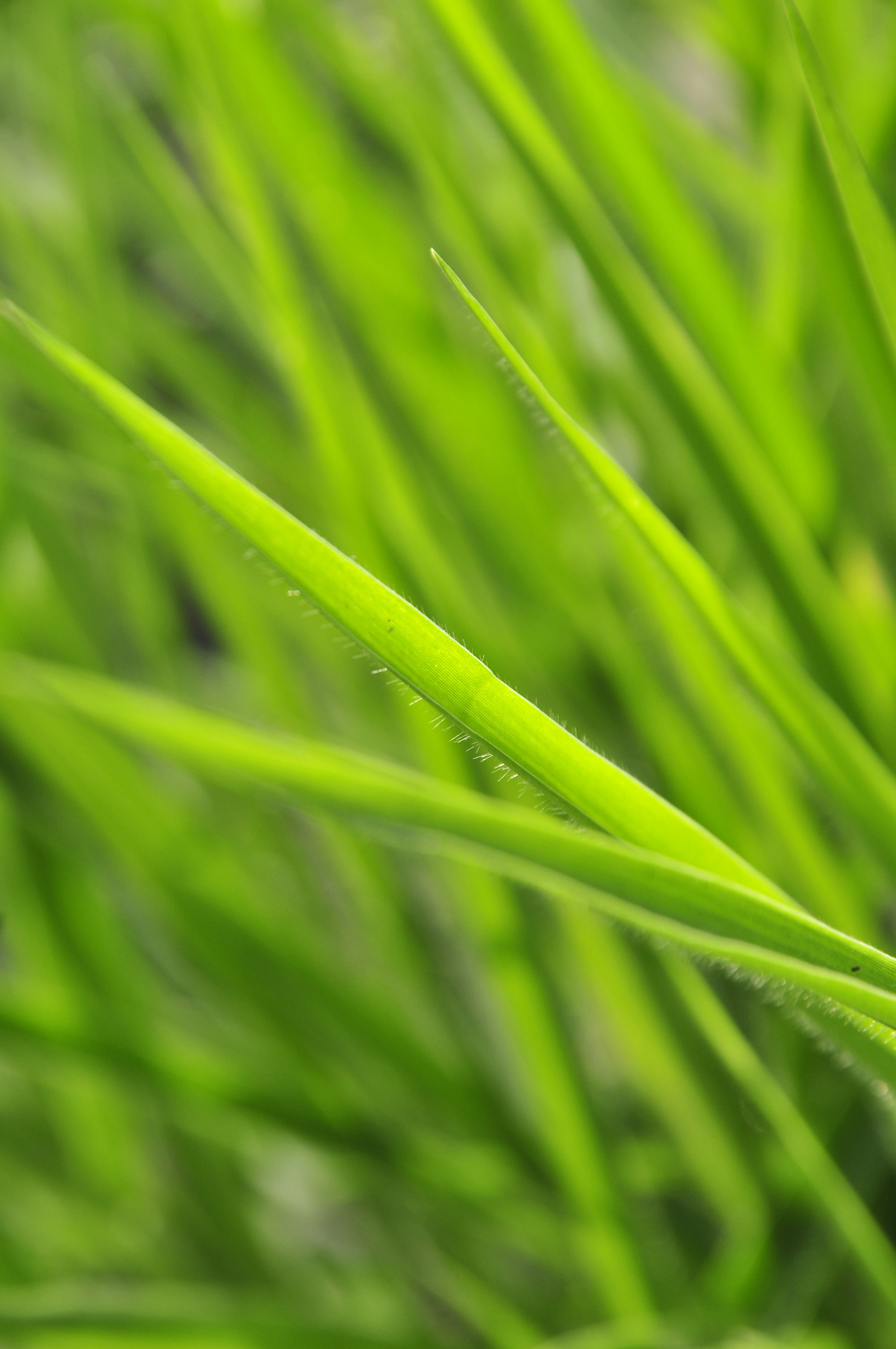
Cultivated Brachiaria

Urochloa species can grow in many environments, from swamps to shady forest to semidesert, but generally do best in savannas and other open tropical ecosystems such as in East Africa. In Angola, Urochloa brizantha grows on termite mounds and in the ecotone between grassland and woodland habitat. In the Kora National Reserve in Kenya, Urochloa species dominate the ground layer along with those of the genus Aristida. In India, the native Urochloa ramosa is an important food source for the Eurasian collared dove and Urochloa species are forage for other local herbivores.

In North America, the native Urochloa platyphylla (broadleaf signalgrass), grows after heavy rains and then reproduces prodigiously and quickly, sometimes becoming a weed.

Wide expanses of the tropics, especially the Neotropics, have been converted to pastures of Urochloa species to support livestock. In Brazil, 80 million hectares of native habitat have been planted with African grasses, mostly Urochloa.

Introduced species such as Urochloa grasses can degrade habitat and compete with native species. In Northern Australia, the exotic Urochloa eminii competes with the native tree Alphitonia petriei by inhibiting the growth of seedlings, slowing the conversion of abandoned pastureland to natural forest. In the Paragominas area of Brazil, however, native forest outcompetes cultivated stands of Urochloa and other exotic forage grasses, and ranchers struggle to maintain pasture cover. Native species may also utilize exotic Urochloa as a food resource, such as the rock cavy, a native rodent of the caatinga.

== Cultivation ==
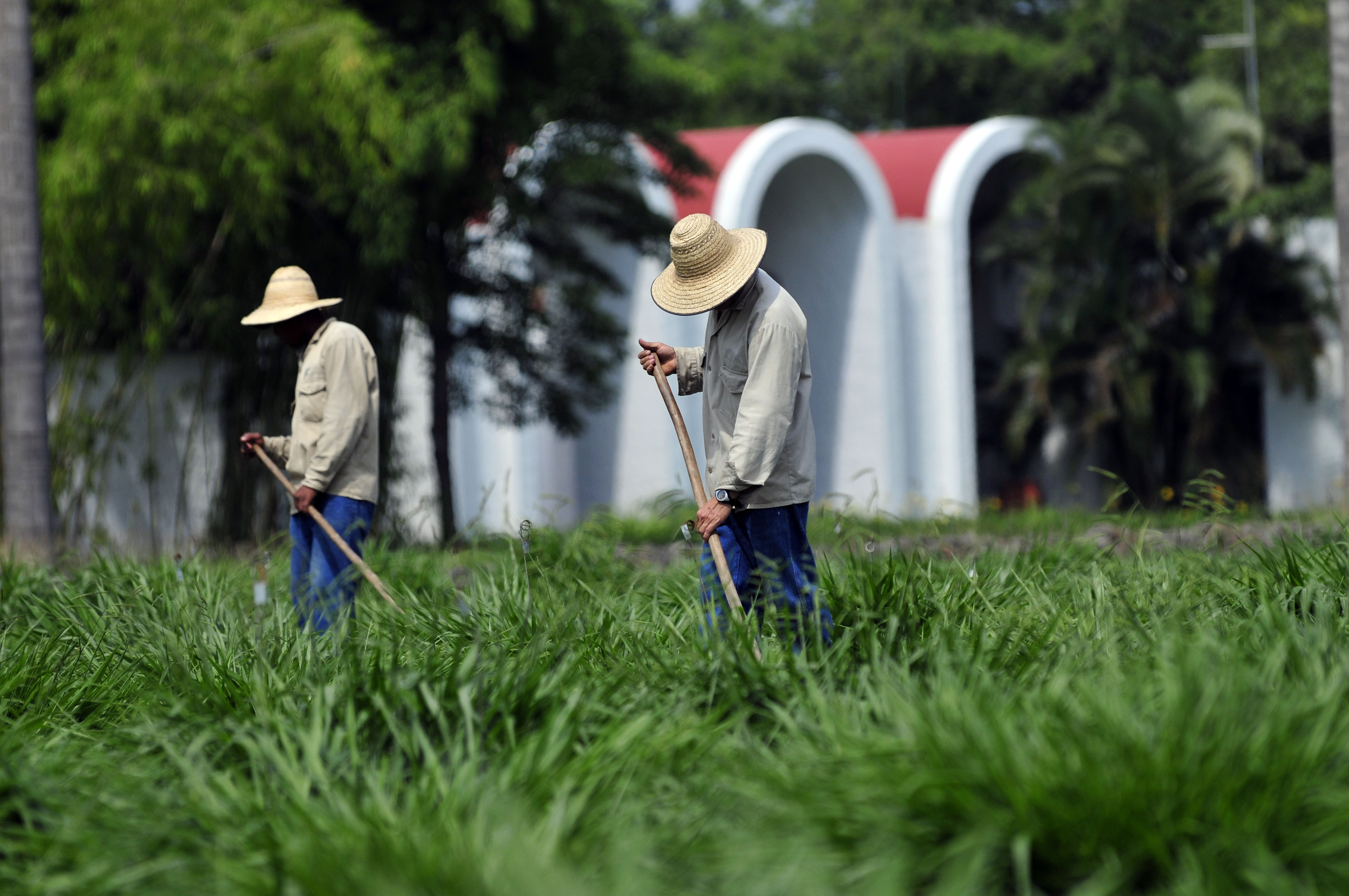
Brachiaria cultivation in Colombia

Urochloa is the single most important genus of forage grass for pastures in the tropics. Urochloa cultivars can grow in infertile and acidic soils. Brazil is the leading user and producer of Urochloa seeds in the Americas.

Mexico has put effort into improving its trade in Urochloa cultivars, and the grass is thought to have made a positive impact on its milk and beef industries. Central American countries have also increased seed sales and area planted in the grass. The annual growth rate of seed sales in 2009 was 32% in Mexico, 62% in Honduras, 45% in Nicaragua, 39% in Costa Rica, and 54% in Panama. The area planted with Urochloa during this period was about 6.5% of the total surface of permanent grasses in Mexico, 12.5% in Honduras, 1% in Nicaragua, 18.7% in Costa Rica, and 0.1% in Panama.

Agricultural pests of Urochloa include spittlebugs, leafcutter ants, and mound-building termites.

Other insect pests include:

- shoot flies Atherigona oryzae, Atherigona pulla, and Atherigona punctata
- caseworm Paraponyx stagnalis
- red hairy caterpillars Amsacta albistriga and Amsacta moorei

== Species ==
As of 2024, more than a hundred species have been accepted in the genus Urochloa:

- Urochloa adspersa (Trin.) R.D.Webster
- Urochloa advena (Vickery) R.D.Webster
- Urochloa albicoma (Swallen & García-Barr.) Morrone & Zuloaga
- Urochloa ambigens (Chiov.) Oulo, Zon & Sosef
- Urochloa argentea (R.Br.) Hughes
- Urochloa arida (Mez) Rudov
- Urochloa arizonica (Scribn. & Merr.) Morrone & Zuloaga
- Urochloa arrecta (Hack. ex T.Durand & Schinz) Morrone & Zuloaga
- Urochloa atrisola R.D.Webster
- Urochloa bovonei (Chiov.) A.M.Torres & C.M.Morton
- Urochloa brachyura (Hack.) Stapf - eastern and southern Africa
- Urochloa breviglumis (Clayton) Oulo, Zon & Sosef
- Urochloa brevispicata (Rendle) Sosef
- Urochloa brizantha (A.Rich.) R.D.Webster - tropical and southern Africa
- Urochloa burmanica (Bor) Veldkamp
- Urochloa caboverdiana (Conert & C.Kohler) Veldkamp, Potdar & S.R.Yadav
- Urochloa chusqueoides (Hack.) Rudov
- Urochloa ciliatissima (Buckley) R.D.Webster
- Urochloa clavipila (Chiov.) Sosef
- Urochloa comata (Hochst. ex A.Rich.) Sosef
- Urochloa comorense (Mez) Oulo, Zon & Sosef
- Urochloa deflexa (Schumach.) H.Scholz
- Urochloa dictyoneura (Fig. & De Not.) Veldkamp
- Urochloa distachyoides (Stapf) Sosef
- Urochloa distachyos (L.) T.Q.Nguyen
- Urochloa dura (Stapf) A.M.Torres & C.M.Morton
- Urochloa echinolaenoides Stapf - Democratic Republic of the Congo, Tanzania, Malawi, Zambia
- Urochloa eminii (Mez) Davidse
- Urochloa falcifera (Trin.) Zon
- Urochloa foliosa (R.Br.) R.D.Webster
- Urochloa fusca (Sw.) B.F.Hansen & Wunderlin (browntop signalgrass) - southern USA to Argentina
- Urochloa fusiformis (Reeder) Veldkamp
- Urochloa gilesii (Benth.) Hughes
- Urochloa glomerata (Stapf) Oulo, Zon & Sosef
- Urochloa glumaris (Trin.) Veldkamp - SE Asia, Indian subcontinent
- Urochloa grossa (Stapf) Oulo, Zon & Sosef
- Urochloa holosericea (R.Br.) R.D.Webster
- Urochloa humbertiana (A.Camus) Voronts.
- Urochloa jaliscana (Santana Mich.) Espejo & López-Ferr.
- Urochloa jubata (Fig. & De Not.) Sosef
- Urochloa kurzii (Hook.f.) T.Q.Nguyen
- Urochloa lachnantha (Hochst.) A.M.Torres & C.M.Morton
- Urochloa lata (Schumach.) C.E.Hubb.
- Urochloa leersioides (Hochst.) A.M.Torres & C.M.Morton
- Urochloa lindiensis (Pilg.) Oulo, Zon & Sosef
- Urochloa longiflora (Clayton) Oulo, Zon & Sosef
- Urochloa lorentziana (Mez) Morrone & Zuloaga
- Urochloa marlothii (Hack.) Oulo, Zon & Sosef
- Urochloa megastachya (Nees ex Trin.) Morrone & Zuloaga
- Urochloa meziana (Hitchc.) Morrone & Zuloaga
- Urochloa mollis (Sw.) Morrone & Zuloaga
- Urochloa multiculma (Andersson) Morrone & Zuloaga
- Urochloa mutica (Forssk.) T.Q.Nguyen
- Urochloa nana (Stapf) Voronts.
- Urochloa nigropedata (Munro ex Ficalho & Hiern) A.M.Torres & C.M.Morton
- Urochloa notochthona (Domin) Hughes
- Urochloa oblita (Swallen) Morrone & Zuloaga
- Urochloa occidentalis (C.A.Gardner & C.E.Hubb.) B.K.Simon
- Urochloa oligobrachiata (Pilg.) Kartesz
- Urochloa oligotricha (Fig. & De Not.) Henrard - Africa
- Urochloa olivacea Sánchez-Ken - western Mexico
- Urochloa ophryodes (Chase) Morrone & Zuloaga
- Urochloa orthostachys (Mez) K.M.Ibrahim & P.M.Peterson
- Urochloa ovalis (Stapf) Zon
- Urochloa panicoides P.Beauv. (panic liverseed grass) - Africa, southern Asia
- Urochloa pauciflora Sánchez-Ken - western Mexico
- Urochloa paucispicata (Morong) Morrone & Zuloaga
- Urochloa piligera (F.Muell. ex Benth.) R.D.Webster
- Urochloa plantaginea (Link) R.D.Webster
- Urochloa platynota (K.Schum.) Pilg.
- Urochloa platyphylla (Munro ex C.Wright) R.D.Webster
- Urochloa platyrrhachis C.E.Hubb. - Zambia, Democratic Republic of the Congo
- Urochloa polyphylla (R.Br.) R.D.Webster
- Urochloa polystachya (Kunth) Mabb.
- Urochloa praetervisa (Domin) Hughes
- Urochloa psammophila (Welw. ex Rendle) Oulo, Zon & Sosef
- Urochloa pseudodichotoma (Bosser) Voronts.
- Urochloa pubigera (Roem. & Schult.) R.D.Webster
- Urochloa ramosa (L.) T.Q.Nguyen
- Urochloa reptans (L.) Stapf
- Urochloa reticulata (Stapf) Sosef
- Urochloa rudis Stapf - Somalia, Kenya, Tanzania
- Urochloa rugulosa (Stapf) Sosef
- Urochloa sclerochlaena Chiov. - Ethiopia, Kenya
- Urochloa semiundulata (Hochst. ex A.Rich.) Ashal. & V.J.Nair
- Urochloa serrata (Thunb.) Sosef
- Urochloa serrifolia (Hochst.) Zon
- Urochloa setigera (Retz.) Stapf - Indian subcontinent, southern China, SE. Asia
- Urochloa stigmatisata (Mez) K.M.Ibrahim & P.M.Peterson
- Urochloa subulifolia (Mez) Torres Gonz. & C.M.Morton
- Urochloa tanimbarensis (Ohwi) Veldkamp
- Urochloa texana (Buckley) R.D.Webster
- Urochloa trichopodioides (Mez & K.Schum.) S.M.Phillips & S.L.Chen - Democratic Republic of the Congo, Tanzania, Kenya, Ethiopia
- Urochloa trichopus (Hochst.) Stapf - Africa, Arabian Peninsula
- Urochloa turbinata (Van der Veken) Sosef
- Urochloa umbellata (Trin.) Oulo, Zon & Sosef
- Urochloa umbratilis (Napper) Oulo, Zon & Sosef
- Urochloa uzondoiensis (Sánchez-Ken) Oulo, Zon & Sosef
- Urochloa villosa (Lam.) T.Q.Nguyen
- Urochloa whiteana (Domin) R.D.Webster
- Urochloa wittei (Robyns) Sosef
- Urochloa xantholeuca (Hack.) H.Scholz

=== Formerly included ===
Numerous species once considered members of Urochloa but are now regarded as better suited to other genera, such as Alloteropsis, Ixophorus, Oplismenus, Panicum, and Rupichloa.
