= Aidophus coheni =

Scientific classification
- Kingdom: Animalia
- Phylum: Arthropoda
- Clade: Pancrustacea
- Class: Insecta
- Order: Coleoptera
- Suborder: Polyphaga
- Infraorder: Scarabaeiformia
- Family: Scarabaeidae
- Genus: Aidophus
- Species: A. coheni

Binomial name
- Aidophus coheni Stebnicka & Skelley, 2005

Species of beetle

Aidophus coheni is a species of beetle of the family Scarabaeidae. It is found in Ecuador.

== Description ==
Adults reach a length of about 4–4.5 mm (0.16–0.18 in). They have an elongate-oblong, shiny, pale yellowish-brown, body. They are glabrous above. The antennal club, sides and base of the pronotum, second elytral interval and, in some specimens, the base and fourth interval are yellowish. The legs are testaceous.

== Etymology ==
The species is named in honour of its collector, Jeffrey Cohen.
