= Aidophus pellax =

Scientific classification
- Kingdom: Animalia
- Phylum: Arthropoda
- Clade: Pancrustacea
- Class: Insecta
- Order: Coleoptera
- Suborder: Polyphaga
- Infraorder: Scarabaeiformia
- Family: Scarabaeidae
- Genus: Aidophus
- Species: A. pellax

Binomial name
- Aidophus pellax (Balthasar, 1960)

Synonyms
- Aphodius (Orodaliscoides) pellax Balthasar, 1960

Species of beetle

Aidophus pellax is a species of beetle of the family Scarabaeidae. It is found in Bolivia.

== Description ==
Adults reach a length of about 4.5–5 mm (0.18–0.20 in). They have a strongly elongate, subcylindrical, shiny, glabrous, pale yellowish-brown body. Part of the head, the antennal club and the sides and base of the pronotum, as well as the base, second interval and apex of the elytra are yellowish. The legs are testaceous.
