= Blackburneus =

Scientific classification
- Kingdom: Animalia
- Phylum: Arthropoda
- Clade: Pancrustacea
- Class: Insecta
- Order: Coleoptera
- Suborder: Polyphaga
- Infraorder: Scarabaeiformia
- Family: Scarabaeidae
- Subfamily: Aphodiinae
- Tribe: Aphodiini
- Genus: Blackburneus; Schmidt, 1914

Genus of beetles

Blackburneus is a genus of beetles of the family Scarabaeidae.

== Species ==
- Blackburneus amazonicus Dellacasa, Dellacasa & Gordon, 2011
- Blackburneus argentinensis (Schmidt, 1909)
- Blackburneus banari Minkina & Bordat, 2019
- Blackburneus calvus (Schmidt, 1909)
- Blackburneus caracaensis (Petrovitz, 1970)
- Blackburneus charmionus (Bates, 1887)
- Blackburneus clipealis (Endrödi, 1964)
- Blackburneus cobi (Endrödi, 1979)
- Blackburneus collarti Paulian, 1942
- Blackburneus consonus (Endrödi, 1967)
- Blackburneus dellacasarum Bordat, 2005
- Blackburneus diminutus (Bates, 1887)
- Blackburneus dubitabilis (Endrödi, 1967)
- Blackburneus erythrinus (Bates, 1887)
- Blackburneus furcatus (Schmidt, 1909)
- Blackburneus guatemalensis (Bates, 1887)
- Blackburneus improvisus Bordat, 2017
- Blackburneus indio (Petrovitz, 1973)
- Blackburneus ineptus (Petrovitz, 1964)
- Blackburneus jugalis (Péringuey, 1901)
- Blackburneus koenigsbaueri (Petrovitz, 1973)
- Blackburneus laxepunctatus (Schmidt, 1910)
- Blackburneus levis (Schmidt, 1908)
- Blackburneus microreticulatus (Landin, 1967)
- Blackburneus mollis (Endrödi, 1964)
- Blackburneus morogoroensis (Petrovitz, 1969)
- Blackburneus nyassicus (Petrovitz, 1969)
- Blackburneus ohopohoensis (Endrödi, 1991)
- Blackburneus optatus (Endrödi, 1964)
- Blackburneus pseudocalvus Bordat, 2005
- Blackburneus puncticollis (Petrovitz, 1969)
- Blackburneus radamus (Petrovitz, 1958)
- Blackburneus richteri (Schmidt, 1910)
- Blackburneus sanfilippoi Dellacasa, Dellacasa & Gordon, 2011
- Blackburneus saylorea (Robinson, 1940)
- Blackburneus stebnickae (Pittino, 1988)
- Blackburneus stercorosus (Melsheimer, 1845)
- Blackburneus strandi (Balthasar, 1935)
- Blackburneus surinamensis Dellacasa, Dellacasa & Gordon, 2011
- Blackburneus tachyoryctis (Endrödi, 1960)
- Blackburneus telekii (Bordat, 1992)
- Blackburneus teposcolulaensis Dellacasa, Dellacasa & Gordon, 2011
- Blackburneus thomasi Dellacasa, Dellacasa & Gordon, 2011
- Blackburneus vacca (Endrödi, 1964)
- Blackburneus vadoni (Bordat, 1986)
- Blackburneus vixpunctatus (Endrödi, 1980)
- Blackburneus vojnitsi (Bordat, 1992)
- Blackburneus walteri (Endrödi, 1976)
- Blackburneus xanthus (Bates, 1887)
- Blackburneus zernyi (Petrovitz, 1964)
