= Aidophus =

Scientific classification
- Kingdom: Animalia
- Phylum: Arthropoda
- Clade: Pancrustacea
- Class: Insecta
- Order: Coleoptera
- Suborder: Polyphaga
- Infraorder: Scarabaeiformia
- Family: Scarabaeidae
- Subfamily: Aphodiinae
- Tribe: Aphodiini
- Genus: Aidophus; Balthasar, 1963

Genus of beetles

Aidophus is a genus of aphodiinae dung beetles in the family Scarabaeidae. There are about 12 described species in Aidophus.

== Species ==
These 12 species belong to the genus Aidophus:

- Aidophus cabrali (Petrovitz, 1973)^{c g}
- Aidophus coheni Stebnicka & Skelley, 2005^{c g}
- Aidophus flaveolus (Harold, 1867)^{c g}
- Aidophus flechtmanni Stebnicka & Dellacasa, 2001^{c g}
- Aidophus impressus (Petrovitz, 1970)^{c g}
- Aidophus infuscatopennis (Schmidt, 1909)^{c g}
- Aidophus kolbei (Schmidt, 1911)^{c g}
- Aidophus notatus (Harold, 1859)^{c g}
- Aidophus panamensis (Harold, 1859)^{c g}
- Aidophus parcus (Horn, 1887)^{i c g b}
- Aidophus pellax (Balthasar, 1960)^{c g}
- Aidophus skelleyi Harpootlian & Gordon, 2002^{i c g b}

Data sources: i = ITIS, c = Catalogue of Life, g = GBIF, b = Bugguide.net
