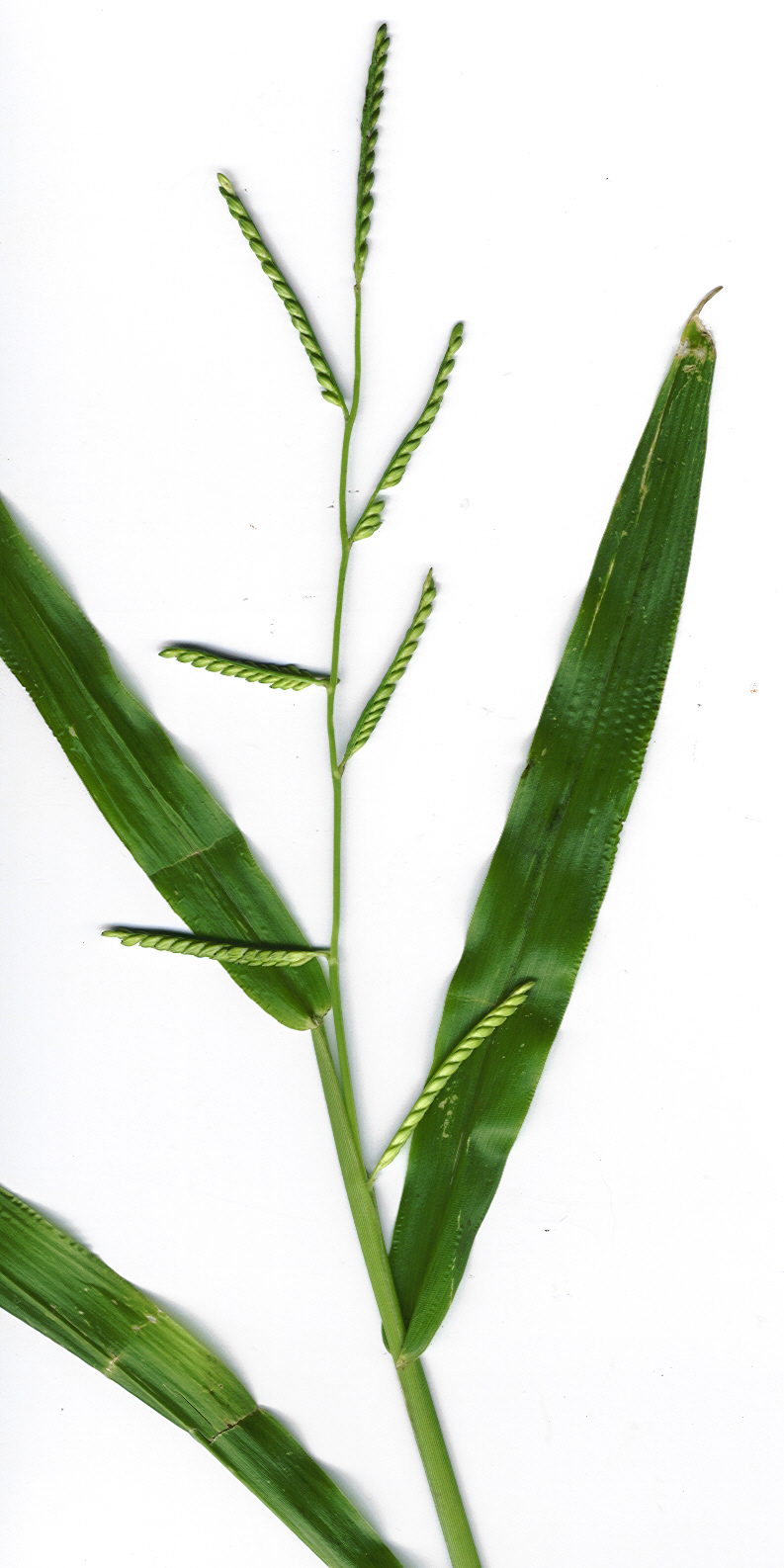

Scientific classification
- Kingdom: Plantae
- Clade: Tracheophytes
- Clade: Angiosperms
- Clade: Monocots
- Clade: Commelinids
- Order: Poales
- Family: Poaceae
- Subfamily: Panicoideae
- Genus: Urochloa
- Species: U. plantaginea

Binomial name
- Urochloa plantaginea (Link) R.D.Webster

Synonyms
- Brachiaria plantaginea (Link) Hitchc.; Panicum disciferum E.Fourn.; Panicum distans Salzm. ex Steud.; Panicum leandri Trin.; Panicum plantagineum Link; Urochloa discifera (E.Fourn.) Morrone & Zuloaga

= Urochloa plantaginea =

Species of grass

Urochloa plantaginea or Brachiaria plantaginea is an annual grass. Its leaf blades are thin and broadly linear. It has rooting at the lower nodes. The ascending ends and flowering branches are normally 8-12 in (20-30 cm) high; the plant as a whole is normally 1'8"-2'7" (50 to 80cm) high. The blades are 2 to 8 inches long (5-20 cm), 1/3-1/2 in (8-12mm) wide. It tends to grow in moist, open ground, and grows from Mexico to Brazil, later introduced in the United States. Its common English name is Alexandergrass.
