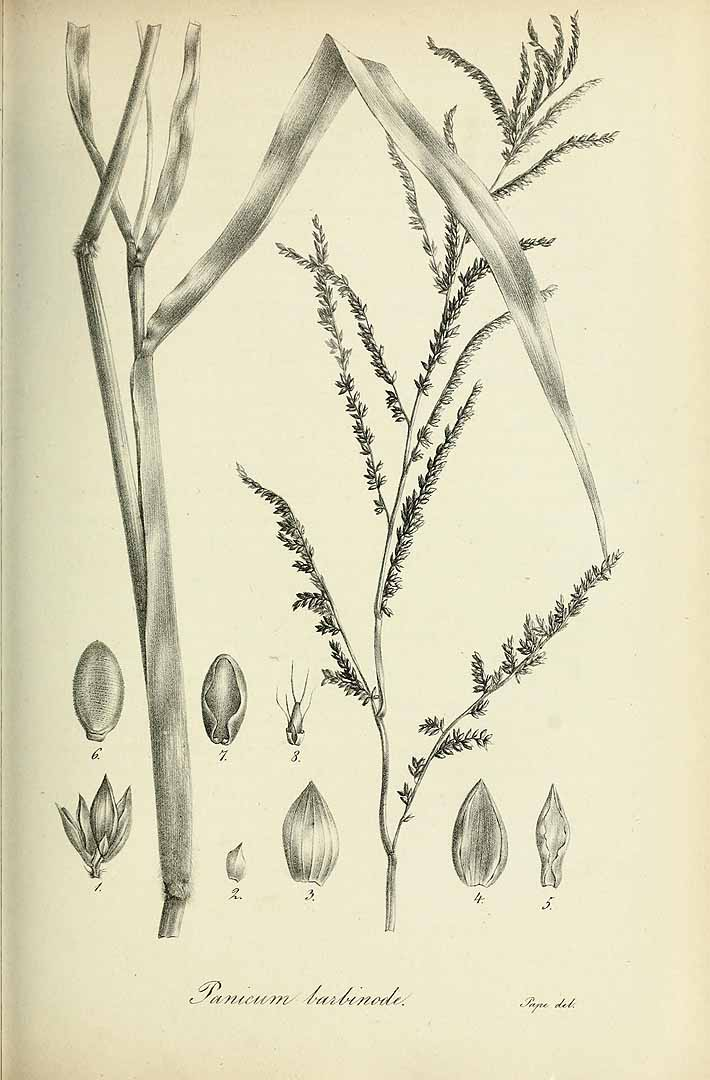

Conservation status
- Least Concern (IUCN 3.1)

Scientific classification
- Kingdom: Plantae
- Clade: Tracheophytes
- Clade: Angiosperms
- Clade: Monocots
- Clade: Commelinids
- Order: Poales
- Family: Poaceae
- Subfamily: Panicoideae
- Genus: Urochloa
- Species: U. mutica

Binomial name
- Urochloa mutica (Forssk.) T.Q.Nguyen

Synonyms
- List: Brachiaria mutica (Forssk.) Stapf; Panicum muticum Forssk.; Brachiaria numidiana (Lam.) Henrard; Brachiaria purpurascens (Raddi) Henrard; Panicum amphibium Steud.; Panicum appressum Forssk.; Panicum barbinode Trin.; Panicum equinum Salzm. ex Steud.; Panicum guadaloupense Steud.; Panicum leiogonum Sieber ex Link; Panicum limnaeum Steud.; Panicum numidianum Lam.; Panicum paraguayense Steud. ex Döll; Panicum pictigluma Steud.; Panicum punctulatum Arn. ex Steud.; Panicum purpurascens Raddi.

= Urochloa mutica =

Species of plant

Urochloa mutica, commonly known as para grass, buffalo grass, Mauritius signal grass, pasto pare, malojilla, gramalote, parana, Carib grass, and Scotch grass, is a species of grass. Despite its common name of California grass, it does not occur in California; it is native to northern and central Africa and parts of the Middle East, where it is cultivated for fodder. It was introduced elsewhere and it is now cultivated throughout tropical regions of the world for this purpose.

== Description ==
Para grass is a vigorous, semi-prostrate perennial grass with creeping stolons which can grow up to 5 metres (16 ft) long. The stems have hairy nodes and leaf sheaths and the leaf blades are up to 2 centimetres (0.8 in) wide and 30 centimetres (12 in) long. It roots at the nodes and detached pieces of the plant will easily take root in moist ground. The flower-head is a loose panicle up to 30 centimetres (12 in) long with spreading branches. The paired spikelets are arranged in uneven rows and are elliptical and 2.5 to 5 millimetres (0.1 to 0.2 in) long. The rachis is tinged with purple. Although many flower-heads grow, only a few viable seeds are produced, and propagation is usually by vegetative means. Para grass can be distinguished from the closely related tanner grass (Brachiaria arrecta) by its paired spikelets, tanner grass having single spikelets.

== Distribution and habitat ==
Para grass is native to northern and central Africa and parts of the Middle East. It was introduced into Central America but has largely been superseded there by other species of Brachiaria. It was also introduced into the humid, tropical parts of Australia around 1880 and has become widely naturalised in Queensland. By a few decades later it had become naturalised in much of southern Asia and on many Pacific islands, but is confined to its preferred habitat of poorly drained, swampy land. Along with tanner grass, it is planted as a fodder grass in seasonally flooded or swampy habitats, and in ponds in pastures, but it can block irrigation ditches and drains. When used as forage for cattle it is usually controlled by the action of the animals, so it does not become too weedy. When it grows in other habitats, however, it can become noxious. It is aggressive and can form dense stands. It may also have allelopathic effects on other plants, preventing their growth.

This species may have been introduced to the Americas on slave ships, on which it was used for bedding. It was in South America by the early 1800s and Mexico by 1872. It was introduced to Florida by the late 1870s to be used as fodder. It has since escaped cultivation in many areas and it now grows as a widespread weed. It is sensitive to frost so it generally does not persist outside warm regions.

== Uses ==
Para grass is mainly cultivated to feed livestock as it makes a high quality forage for ruminant animals.

== Invasive species ==
The plant is an invasive species in many Pacific Islands and Pacific Rim countries.

=== Australia ===
The species has invaded the northern and north-western areas of Australia has the potential to spread further inland. It is present in Kakadu National Park. In Australia, this grass forms vast stands, destroying waterfowl nesting habitat and displacing native plants.

=== United States ===
In Florida this grass grows in various wetland habitat types, such as marshes and floodplains, as well as disturbed areas such as roadsides. In Hawaii this grass is widespread, especially in freshwater wetlands and in red mangrove (Rhizophora mangle) stands. It is thought to be a cause of the decline of the rare Hawaiian endemic Boyd's maiden fern (Thelypteris boydiae).
