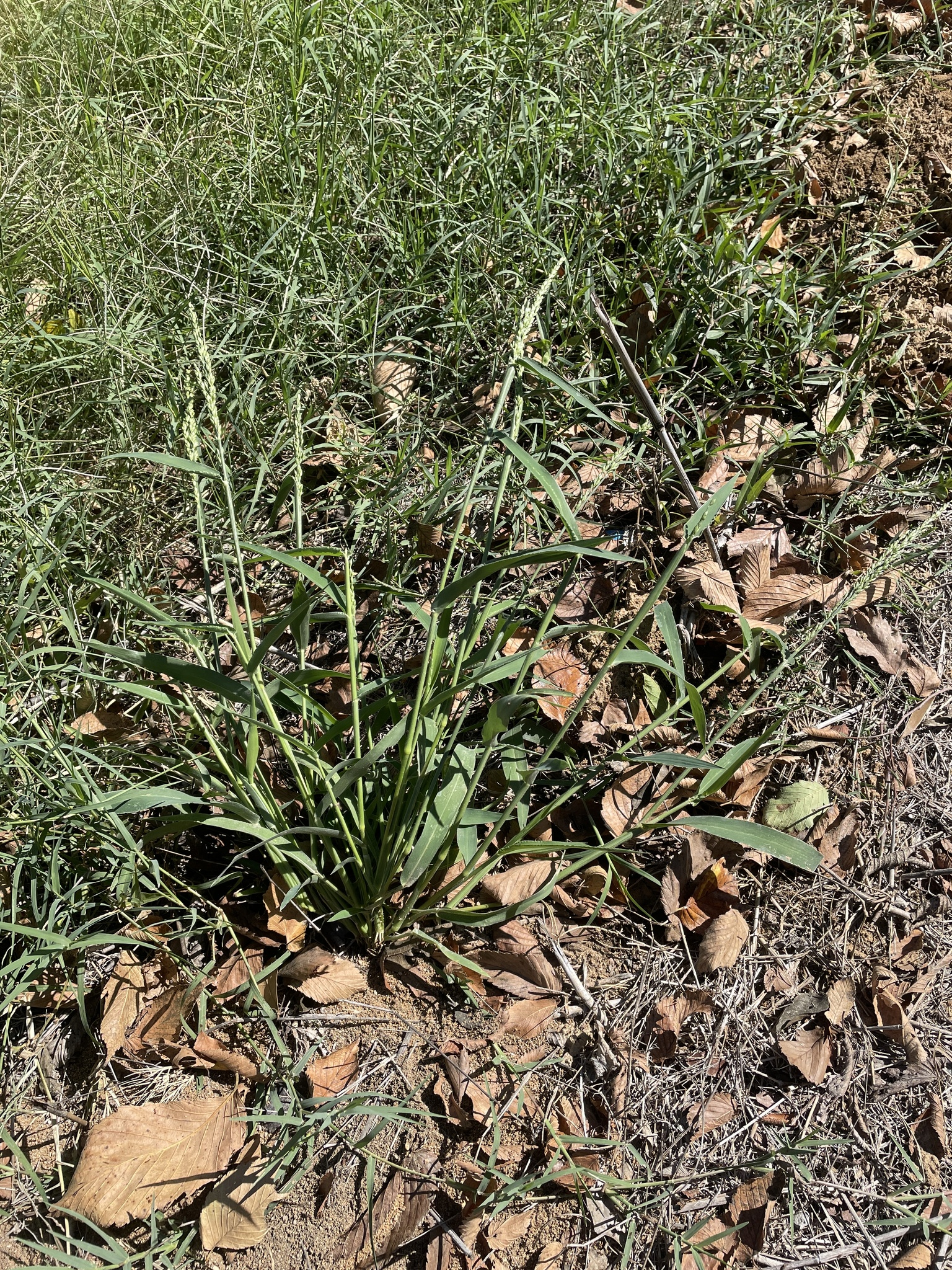

Conservation status
- Least Concern (IUCN 3.1)

Scientific classification
- Kingdom: Plantae
- Clade: Embryophytes
- Clade: Tracheophytes
- Clade: Angiosperms
- Clade: Monocots
- Clade: Commelinids
- Order: Poales
- Family: Poaceae
- Subfamily: Panicoideae
- Genus: Urochloa
- Species: U. texana

Binomial name
- Urochloa texana (Buckley) R.D.Webster

Synonyms
- Brachiaria texana (Buckley) S.T.Blake; Panicum texanum Buckley

= Urochloa texana =

Species of flowering plant

Urochloa texana, commonly known as Texas millet or Texas signalgrass, is a weedy grass native to the southeastern United States belonging to the Poaceae (grass) family. In addition to its native range, it is an introduced species in Palestine and northeast Australia.

== Description ==
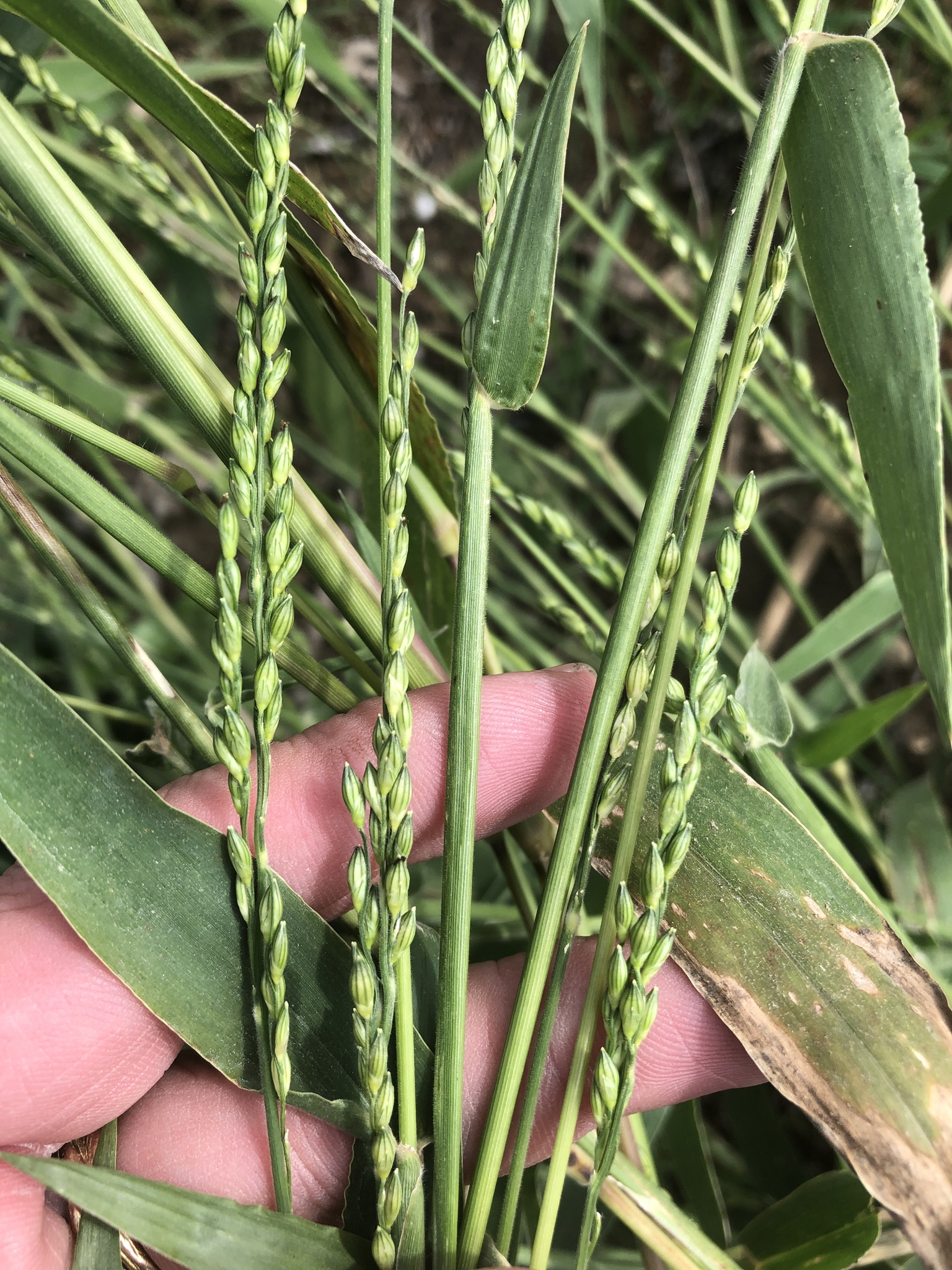
Panicle

Urochloa texana has fibrous roots and leaves finely pubescent on both sides, with pubescent sheathes and a split sleeve. The ligules are membranous and fringed with dense trichomes. The plant forms simple inflorescences 7.0–25.0 cm (2.8–9.8 in) in length.

In habit, Urochloa texana is decumbent or creeping up to 80.0 cm (31.5 in) tall. It is found commonly in areas such as cultivated areas, pastures, fields, roadsides.

== Distribution ==
This species of Urochloa is native to Texas, Alabama, Arizona, Florida, Georgia, Mississippi, North Carolina, Oklahoma, and South Carolina.

It is an introduced species in Delaware, Maryland, and Massachusetts, as well as Palestine, New South Wales, and Queensland.

== Ecology ==
Urochloa texana is considered a crop weed. The weed is especially problematic in peanut cultivation as the tight, fibrous roots of the plant intertwine with the crop. This can cause peanut pods to be stripped from the plant during harvesting, and can also slow the drying process.

The plant utilizes C_{4} carbon fixation.
