= Aidophus notatus =

Scientific classification
- Kingdom: Animalia
- Phylum: Arthropoda
- Clade: Pancrustacea
- Class: Insecta
- Order: Coleoptera
- Suborder: Polyphaga
- Infraorder: Scarabaeiformia
- Family: Scarabaeidae
- Genus: Aidophus
- Species: A. notatus

Binomial name
- Aidophus notatus (Harold, 1859)

Synonyms
- Aphodius notatus Harold, 1859

Species of beetle

Aidophus notatus is a species of beetle of the family Scarabaeidae. It is found in Colombia, Guyana, Mexico (Campeche, México, Tabasco, Veracruz), the United States (Arizona), Panama and Venezuela.

== Description ==
Adults reach a length of about 3–3.5 mm (0.12–0.14 in). They have a shortly oblong, convex, strongly shiny, glabrous body. The head is reddish-brown and the pronotum is yellowish with two reddish-brown discal spots and a brown spot at middle of each side. The elytra are pale yellowish with reddish-brown. The legs are reddish and the antennal club is yellowish.
