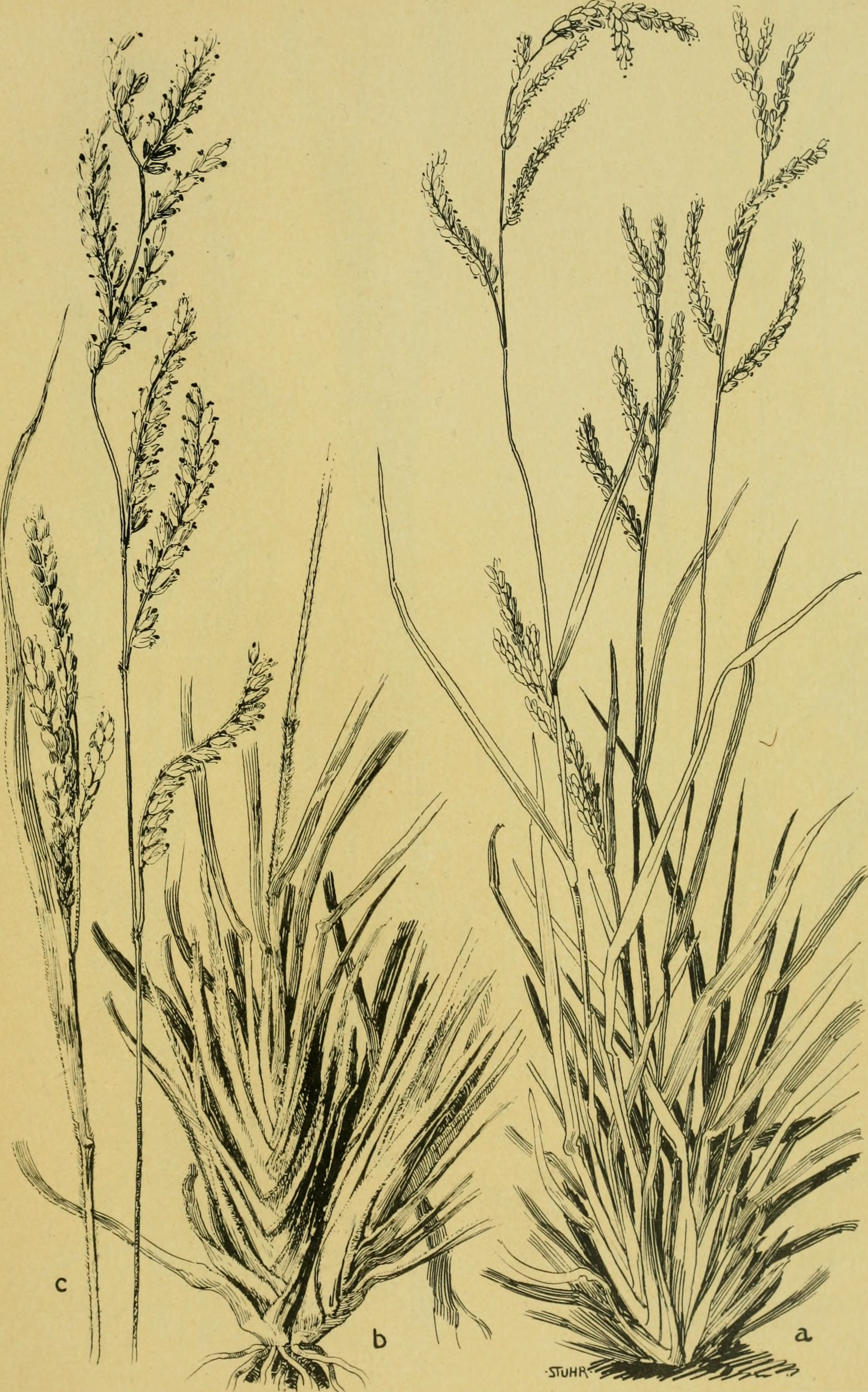

Scientific classification
- Kingdom: Plantae
- Clade: Tracheophytes
- Clade: Angiosperms
- Clade: Monocots
- Clade: Commelinids
- Order: Poales
- Family: Poaceae
- Subfamily: Panicoideae
- Genus: Urochloa
- Species: U. nigropedata

Binomial name
- Urochloa nigropedata (Munro ex Ficalho & Hiern) A.M.Torres & C.M.Morton

Synonyms
- List: Brachiaria nigropedata (Munro ex Ficalho & Hiern) Stapf; Panicum nigropedatum Munro ex Ficalho & Hiern; Brachiaria melanotyla (Hack.) Henrard; Panicum melanotylum Hack.; Brachiaria clavuliseta Chiov.; Brachiaria deflexa var. sativa Portères; Brachiaria regularis (Nees) Stapf; Brachiaria stapfiana Basappa & Muniy.; Panicum clavulisetum Chiov.; Panicum glycerioides Chiov.; Panicum nudiglume Hochst.; Panicum petiveri var. nudiglume (Hochst.) Chiov.; Panicum petiveri var. robustissimum Chiov.; Panicum regulare Nees; Panicum ruprechtii E.Fourn. ex Hemsl.; Panicum sorghi Delile

= Urochloa nigropedata =

Species of grass

Urochloa nigropedata, commonly known as spotted brachiaria, is a perennial grass belonging to the grass family (Poaceae). It is native to Southern Africa in the tropical regions of South Africa and East Africa. Urochloa nigropedata is used as fodder grass in Namibia.

As a pioneering grass, it has also environmental uses such as revegetation and soil binding.
