= Aidophus skelleyi =

Scientific classification
- Kingdom: Animalia
- Phylum: Arthropoda
- Clade: Pancrustacea
- Class: Insecta
- Order: Coleoptera
- Suborder: Polyphaga
- Infraorder: Scarabaeiformia
- Family: Scarabaeidae
- Tribe: Aphodiini
- Genus: Aidophus
- Species: A. skelleyi

Binomial name
- Aidophus skelleyi Harpootlian & Gordon, 2002

Species of beetle

Aidophus skelleyi, a member of the Scarabaeidae family, is a type of dung beetle belonging to the aphodiine species. It is found in the United States (Florida).

== Description ==
Adults reach a length of about 2.5–3.1 mm (0.098–0.122 in). They have a shortly oblong, convex, moderately shiny, glabrous, pale yellowish body. The pronotum has a small brownish spot on each side.

== Etymology ==
The species is named in honour of Paul E. Skelley, who discovered the species.
