= Blackburneus ohopohoensis =

Scientific classification
- Kingdom: Animalia
- Phylum: Arthropoda
- Clade: Pancrustacea
- Class: Insecta
- Order: Coleoptera
- Suborder: Polyphaga
- Infraorder: Scarabaeiformia
- Family: Scarabaeidae
- Genus: Blackburneus
- Species: B. ohopohoensis

Binomial name
- Blackburneus ohopohoensis (Endrödi, 1991)

Synonyms
- Aphodius (Blackburneus) ohopohoensis Endrödi, 1991

Species of beetle

Blackburneus ohopohoensis is a species of beetle of the family Scarabaeidae. It is found in Namibia.

== Description ==
Adults reach a length of about 2.2–3 mm (0.087–0.118 in). They have a shiny, glabrous, dark reddish-brown body, with the vertex and the disc of the pronotum often darkened.
