= Aidophus cabrali =

Scientific classification
- Kingdom: Animalia
- Phylum: Arthropoda
- Clade: Pancrustacea
- Class: Insecta
- Order: Coleoptera
- Suborder: Polyphaga
- Infraorder: Scarabaeiformia
- Family: Scarabaeidae
- Genus: Aidophus
- Species: A. cabrali

Binomial name
- Aidophus cabrali (Petrovitz, 1973)

Synonyms
- Didactylia cabrali Petrovitz, 1973

Species of beetle

Aidophus cabrali is a species of beetle of the family Scarabaeidae. It is found in Brazil (Paraíba).

== Description ==
Adults reach a length of about 3.2 mm (0.13 in). The head is emarginate medially and the clypeus is finely punctate, with the punctation subrugose anteriorly. The pronotum has dense and uneven punctation. Elytral interstriae eight and ten are distinctively elevated posteriorly and have fine and scarce punctures.
