= Aidophus flechtmanni =

Scientific classification
- Kingdom: Animalia
- Phylum: Arthropoda
- Clade: Pancrustacea
- Class: Insecta
- Order: Coleoptera
- Suborder: Polyphaga
- Infraorder: Scarabaeiformia
- Family: Scarabaeidae
- Genus: Aidophus
- Species: A. flechtmanni

Binomial name
- Aidophus flechtmanni Stebnicka & Dellacasa, 2001

Species of beetle

Aidophus flechtmanni is a species of beetle of the family Scarabaeidae. It is found in Brazil (Mato Grosso do Sul).

== Description ==
Adults reach a length of about 3–4 mm (0.12–0.16 in). The clypeus is slightly emarginate and the head has fine and scarce punctures, but the frons has large punctures. The pronotum has punctures of two sizes: punctures symmetrically distributed on the disc, but closer on the sides. The posterior angles of the pronotum are obtusely rounded. The elytra are shagreened, with the interstriae discretely convex and finely punctate.

== Etymology ==
The species is named in honor of Dr. Carlos F. Flechtmann.
