= Blackburneus laxepunctatus =

Scientific classification
- Kingdom: Animalia
- Phylum: Arthropoda
- Clade: Pancrustacea
- Class: Insecta
- Order: Coleoptera
- Suborder: Polyphaga
- Infraorder: Scarabaeiformia
- Family: Scarabaeidae
- Genus: Blackburneus
- Species: B. laxepunctatus

Binomial name
- Blackburneus laxepunctatus (Schmidt, 1910)

Synonyms
- Aphodius laxepunctatus Schmidt, 1910

Species of beetle

Blackburneus laxepunctatus is a species of beetle of the family Scarabaeidae. It is found in Argentina, Bolivia, Brazil (Acre, Amapá, Amazonas, Distrito Federal, Mato Grosso, Minas Gerais, Pará, Rondônia, Roraima, São Paulo), Colombia, Costa Rica, French Guiana, Paraguay, Peru, Suriname and Venezuela.

== Description ==
Adults reach a length of about 3–4.5 mm (0.12–0.18 in). The body is light to dark red. The head has punctures of two sizes: fine punctures mixed with coarse punctures, with the latter more numerous on frons. The pronotum also has large and small punctures. The small punctures are regularly spaced on the pronotal surface, while the large punctures are closer and more abundant near the lateral margins. The elytra are shagreened, with the striae fine and finely punctate and the interstriae flat, with two rows of small punctures.

== Life history ==
Specimens have been collected at altitudes ranging from 90 to 1400 metres. Specimens were captured with pitfall traps baited with human or cow dung.
