= Blackburneus surinamensis =

Scientific classification
- Kingdom: Animalia
- Phylum: Arthropoda
- Clade: Pancrustacea
- Class: Insecta
- Order: Coleoptera
- Suborder: Polyphaga
- Infraorder: Scarabaeiformia
- Family: Scarabaeidae
- Genus: Blackburneus
- Species: B. surinamensis

Binomial name
- Blackburneus surinamensis Dellacasa, Dellacasa & Gordon, 2011

Species of beetle

Blackburneus surinamensis is a species of beetle of the family Scarabaeidae. It is found in Brazil (Amazonas) and Suriname.

== Description ==
Adults reach a length of about 3.5–4 mm (0.14–0.16 in). The body is wide and light brown. The head has a sinuate clypeus with punctures of two sizes, fine and coarse. The coarse punctures are closer near to the posterior half of the clypeus. The frons is coarsely punctate. The pronotum has punctures of two sizes: fine and coarse. The coarse punctures are distant on the disc and closer laterally. The elytra have flat interstriae and are minutely punctured.
