= Aidophus panamensis =

Scientific classification
- Kingdom: Animalia
- Phylum: Arthropoda
- Clade: Pancrustacea
- Class: Insecta
- Order: Coleoptera
- Suborder: Polyphaga
- Infraorder: Scarabaeiformia
- Family: Scarabaeidae
- Genus: Aidophus
- Species: A. panamensis

Binomial name
- Aidophus panamensis (Harold, 1859)

Synonyms
- Aphodius panamensis Harold, 1859

Species of beetle

Aidophus panamensis is a species of beetle of the family Scarabaeidae. It is found in Panama and possibly Venezuela.

== Description ==
Adults reach a length of about 3.5–4 mm (0.14–0.16 in). They have a subcylindrical, moderately convex, shiny, glabrous, brownish body, with the sides of the pronotum yellowish. The base, second interval, apex and lateral border of the elytra are also yellowish, while the legs are yellowish-brown. The antennal club is piceous.
