= Aidophus impressus =

Scientific classification
- Kingdom: Animalia
- Phylum: Arthropoda
- Clade: Pancrustacea
- Class: Insecta
- Order: Coleoptera
- Suborder: Polyphaga
- Infraorder: Scarabaeiformia
- Family: Scarabaeidae
- Genus: Aidophus
- Species: A. impressus

Binomial name
- Aidophus impressus (Petrovitz, 1970)

Synonyms
- Didactylia impressa Petrovitz, 1970

Species of beetle

Aidophus impressus is a species of beetle of the family Scarabaeidae. It is found in Brazil (Piauí).

== Description ==
Adults reach a length of about 3.8–4.2 mm (0.15–0.17 in). The head has symmetrically distributed, fine and coarse punctures. The coarse punctures are more abundant on the frons. The clypeus has a small emargination and is weakly gibbous and finely punctate. The pronotum has punctures of two sizes: larger punctures closer near the lateral margins. The posterior angles are rounded. The elytral interstriae are microreticulate and finely punctate. Elytral interstriae eight and ten are more elevated than others.
