= Aidophus flaveolus =

Scientific classification
- Kingdom: Animalia
- Phylum: Arthropoda
- Clade: Pancrustacea
- Class: Insecta
- Order: Coleoptera
- Suborder: Polyphaga
- Infraorder: Scarabaeiformia
- Family: Scarabaeidae
- Genus: Aidophus
- Species: A. flaveolus

Binomial name
- Aidophus flaveolus (Harold, 1867)

Synonyms
- Aphodius flaveolus Harold, 1867

Species of beetle

Aidophus flaveolus is a species of beetle of the family Scarabaeidae. It is found in Argentina and Chile. It has also been recorded from Mexico (Yucatán).

== Description ==
Adults reach a length of about 3.5–4.5 mm (0.14–0.18 in). They have an elongate, sub-cylindrical, moderately convex, sub-shiny, glabrous, testaceous body. Part of the head, the disc of the pronotum and sutural interval are reddish brown. The legs are reddish and the antennal club is yellowish.
