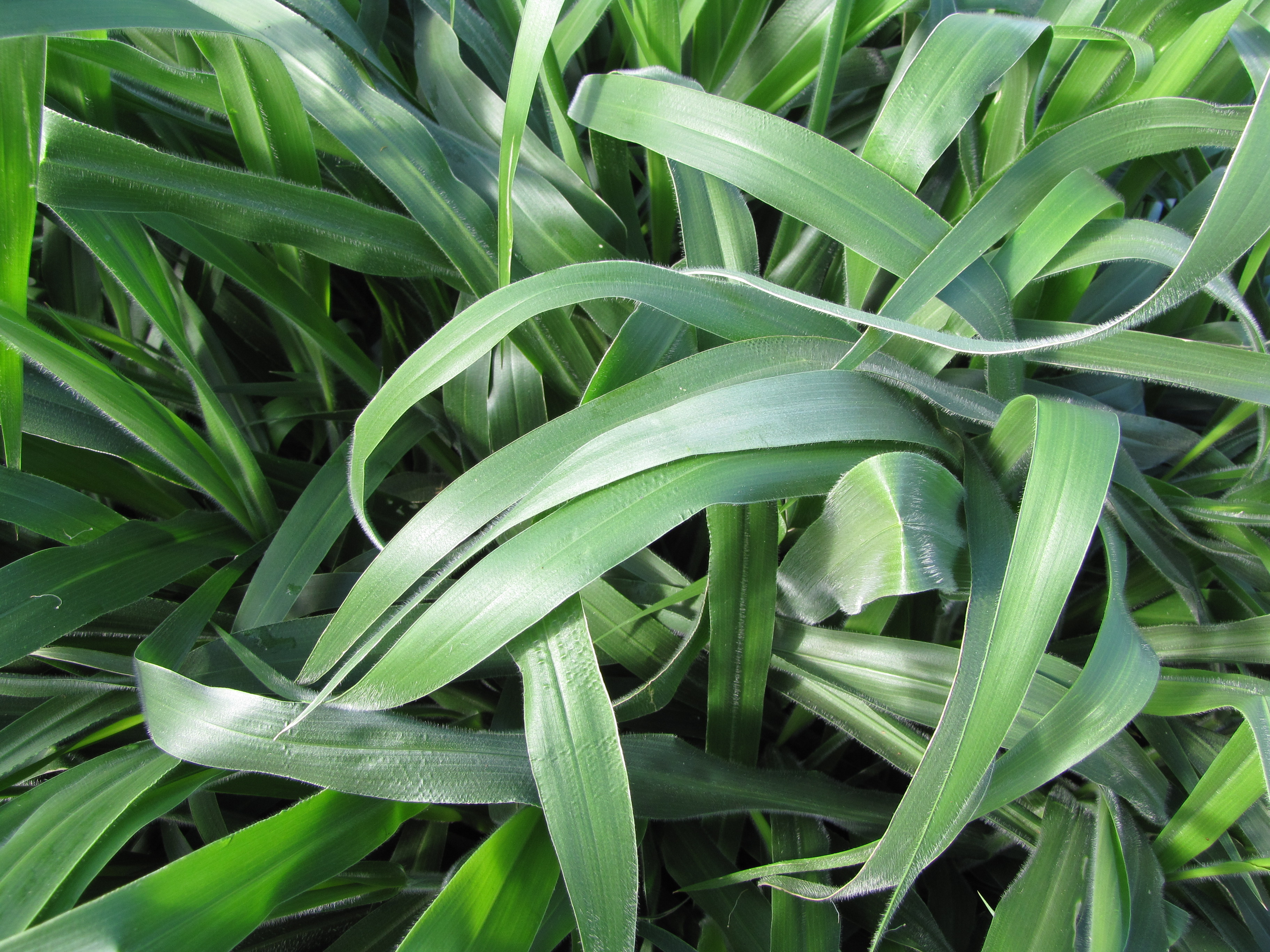

Scientific classification
- Kingdom: Plantae
- Clade: Tracheophytes
- Clade: Angiosperms
- Clade: Monocots
- Clade: Commelinids
- Order: Poales
- Family: Poaceae
- Subfamily: Panicoideae
- Genus: Urochloa
- Species: U. brizantha

Binomial name
- Urochloa brizantha (Hochst. ex A.Rich.) R.Webster

Synonyms
- Brachiaria brizantha (A.Rich.) Stapf; Brachiaria brizantha var. ciliata Basappa & Muniy.; Brachiaria gangangalaensis Vanderyst; Brachiaria manzonzoensis Vanderyst; Urochloa brizantha var. ciliata (Basappa & Muniy.) S.K.Jain; Panicum brizanthum Hochst. ex A.Rich.

= Urochloa brizantha =

Species of plant

Urochloa brizantha (syn. Brachiaria brizantha) is a species of grass known by the common name palisade grass. It is often used as a forage for livestock. Other common names include palisade signal grass, bread grass, Mauritius grass, Surinam grass, large-seeded millet grass, big ashama, Ceylon sheep grass, and St. Lucia grass.

== Description ==
This rhizomatous perennial grass can reach 1 to 2 meters in height. The root system is up to 2 meters deep. The green leaf blades are up to 40 to 100 centimeters long and 2 wide, and are hairless or slightly rough-haired. The inflorescence is a panicle up to 20 centimeters long and 3 wide, divided into several rolled, crescent-shaped branches. The spikelets are solitary, not paired, and they line the crescent-like panicle branches closely. The branches may have purple rachises and the spikelets may be purple-tinged.

== Distribution and habitat ==
The native range of the grass is tropical and southern Africa. It has been purposely introduced to many other parts of the world, including South America and the Pacific. It is the main forage used in Brazil, in an area larger than 70,000 km^{2}. It is adapted to grassland and woodland habitat. It is a warm-season grass that tolerates only light frost. It survives drought better than many other tropical grasses. It will grow in many soil types, but not infertile soils, and it usually requires supplemental nitrogen in cultivation. It can stand some shade and some varieties can tolerate mild flooding.

== Taxonomy ==
Urochloa brizantha is for some authors syn. with Brachiaria brizantha, since the genera Urochloa and Brachiaria are similar in some aspects. A recent phylogenetic analysis concluded that Brachiaria and Urochloa are a monophyletic group, along with Eriochloa and Melinis, and that further molecular and morphological work is needed to establish clear relationships.

== Human uses ==
This grass is used to feed livestock. It is grown in pastures for grazing and cut for hay and fodder. It is resistant to grazing pressure. It is nutritious and palatable. The grass is also used to feed rabbits.

Cultivars include 'Marandú', 'Gigante', 'Insurgente', 'La Libertad', 'Serengeti' and 'Karanga'.

Companions can include grasses such as Urochloa humidicola and U. dictyoneura, and legumes such as perennial Arachis species, Stylosanthes species, Desmodium heterocarpon, D. intortum, Centrosema molle, Alysicarpus vaginalis, Leucaena leucocephala, and Pueraria phaseoloides.

It is used as an ornamental plant and for erosion control.

The grain is edible for humans.

== Toxicology ==
The grass can cause a photosensitization syndrome in animals marked by skin lesions, facial edema, and ruminal stasis. The plant contains saponins which accumulate in the animal liver as sapogenin glucuronide crystals, resulting in liver damage. Neurological symptoms such as ataxia can also occur. This is sometimes a fatal condition. The poisoning is more likely to occur in fields that have not been recently grazed.

== Ecology ==
Other animals will feed on the grass, such as baboons and chimpanzees.

The plant is susceptible to leaf blight caused by the fungus Rhizoctonia solani, rust caused by the fungus Uromyces setariae-italicae, and root rot caused by the bacterium Erwinia chrysanthemi. Claviceps sulcata, an ergot fungus, has been observed on the grass. Shield bugs (Scaptocoris spp.) can damage it, as well. However, it is known for its resistance to spittlebugs such as Deois flavopicta, particularly the cultivar 'Marandú'. It is also resistant to leafcutter ants of the genera Atta and Acromyrmex.
