= Urochloa eminii =

Scientific classification
- Kingdom: Plantae
- Clade: Embryophytes
- Clade: Tracheophytes
- Clade: Spermatophytes
- Clade: Angiosperms
- Clade: Monocots
- Clade: Commelinids
- Order: Poales
- Family: Poaceae
- Subfamily: Panicoideae
- Genus: Urochloa
- Species: U. eminii

Binomial name
- Urochloa eminii (Mez) Davidse

Synonyms
- Homotypic Synonyms: Brachiaria eminii (Mez) Robyns; Panicum eminii Mez; Heterotypic Synonyms: Brachiaria bequaertii Robyns; Brachiaria decumbens Stapf; Brachiaria decumbens var. ruziziensis (R.Germ. & C.M.Evrard) Ndab.; Brachiaria ruziziensis R.Germ. & C.M.Evrard; Urochloa decumbens (Stapf) R.D.Webster; Urochloa ruziziensis (R.Germ. & C.M.Evrard) Crins

Species of grass

Urochloa eminii, commonly known as Congo grass, is a species of forage crop in the family Poaceae that is grown throughout the humid tropics. With fast growth at the beginning of the wet season due to strong seedling vigour, ease of establishment, good seed production and yield and the ability to suppress weeds it has the ability to become developed into the most important forage crop planted in the tropics. With the aid of genomic tools to research the genotype and gain more information there is the ability to increase breeding programs which are currently rather limited.

== Description ==
Urochloa eminii is a tufted grass, that grows as a creeping perennial with short rhizomes that form a dense leafy cover over the ground. Stems of the plant arise from many-noded creeping shoots and short rhizomes and then when fully grown reach a height of 1.5 m when flowering. The leaves of this grass are soft but hairy, with an average width of 15mm, length of 25mm and a seed weight of 250,000/kg. The seeds should be drilled into a well prepared seed bed, sowing in rows that are spaced 60 cm apart and it can be grazed upon as soon as it is ready.

== History, geography and ethnography ==
Urochloa eminii has numerous common names that it is known by throughout the world including Congo grass, Congo signal, Congo signal grass, Chinese cabbage, Kennedy ruzi, Kennedy ruzigrass, prostrate signal grass, ruzi, ruzigrass, and ruzi grass.

Native to Burundi, Rwanda and eastern DR Congo, from which it derives its common name, this forage crop has now been naturalised throughout the humid tropics. Four Brachiaria species now cover as much as 85% of the cultivated pastures of Brazil.

== Growing conditions ==
Congo grass can be established from seed which is inexpensive although it needs to be stored for six months after harvest. Alternatively the grass can be established vegetatively from stem cuttings with root nodes. It requires light soils with moderately to high fertility though it does not tolerate strongly acidic conditions and performs best in a well-drained soil. It requires a reasonably high rainfall, though it can endure dry spells, with 1000 mm or more being preferable. It requires a well prepared seed bed but light disc harrowing gives good results. Although it responds well to light, with light intensity increasing yields, it can also be planted for grazing under coconut plantations. Optimum growth occurs at 33/28 °C day/night with a minimum temperature of 19 °C.

== Stress tolerance ==
Congo grass does have certain stress tolerances that are disadvantages to poor farmers and breeding these out in the future would add significant value to this crop. It demands a relatively high fertility soil for good growth as well as adequate fertiliser use if there is persistent grazing or cutting of the crop. Heavy frosts will kill this crop and a light frost will make future regrowth very slow. Congo grass flourishes well in a well drain soil and has a poor tolerance to floods and heavy rains.

== Major weeds, pests and diseases ==
Although it is able to form a dense ground cover to compete with weeds, Congo Grass is susceptible to certain pests and diseases. It is severely attacked by the spittlebug who cause significant damage to the plant in Tropical America affecting the development and persistence of the plants. As well the plant seeds are known to be affected by the fungus Sphacelia in the Congo.

== Genetic stocks ==
Currently the only cultivar is the Kennedy Ruzi which can be found in both Thailand and Australia. It performs well on the wet tropical coast and has a high seed yield. Very little breeding has occurred current, but research into microsatellite markers could lead to further developments in genetic stocks and diversification of the crop.

== Uses and consumption ==
Congo Grass can be used as both a permanent or semi-permanent grass for pastures. It can be used to graze animals on or for cutting for green feed and conservation. This forage crop is found across much of the humid tropics through South America, Africa and Southeast Asia. Congo grass is a valuable forage for ruminants.

== Nutritional information ==
With large proportions of the tropics grazing their cattle, a forage crop like this that proves better than most other species of the genus Urochloa could have significant advantages to poor farmers. It is a very palatable crop with as well as having an overall digestibility of 55–75%. For ruzi grass hay that was cut 45 days after seeding in northeast Thailand, the in vitro dry matter digestibility, crude fibre, and neutral detergent fibre were 61%, 80.5%, and 72.8% respectively. Nutrient values include 0.43g/100g Calcium, 0.22g/100g Phosphorus, 2.4g/100g Potassium, 0.1g/100g Sodium, 0.28g/100g Magnesium.

== Economics ==
Congo grass has an important role as a forage crop and significant value can be added by increases crop yields and working on breeding out certain susceptibilities to pests.

== Constraints to wider adoption ==
General knowledge is keeping this forage crop from wider and better usage around the world. Due to the almost complete lack of information that currently exists regarding Congo grass and its genome, there is little to support breeding programs for the crop. But because Congo grass is similar to other model cereals, in the fact that it has a relatively small genome, it enables genome analysis initiatives to support future breeding. There is potential here to diversify pasture and develop new cultivars of the species. Recent research has shown developed markers that are readily suitable for analysis and there is a promising future for research into this crop.

== Practical information ==
Pairing Urochloa eminii with legumes can significantly affect the production levels of the crop. Studies have shown that plots planted with legumes showed a boost in total dry matter production of 524%. Not only does it increase production but the nitrogen fixing capacities of legumes offers a much cheaper alternative to expensive fertilizers.
