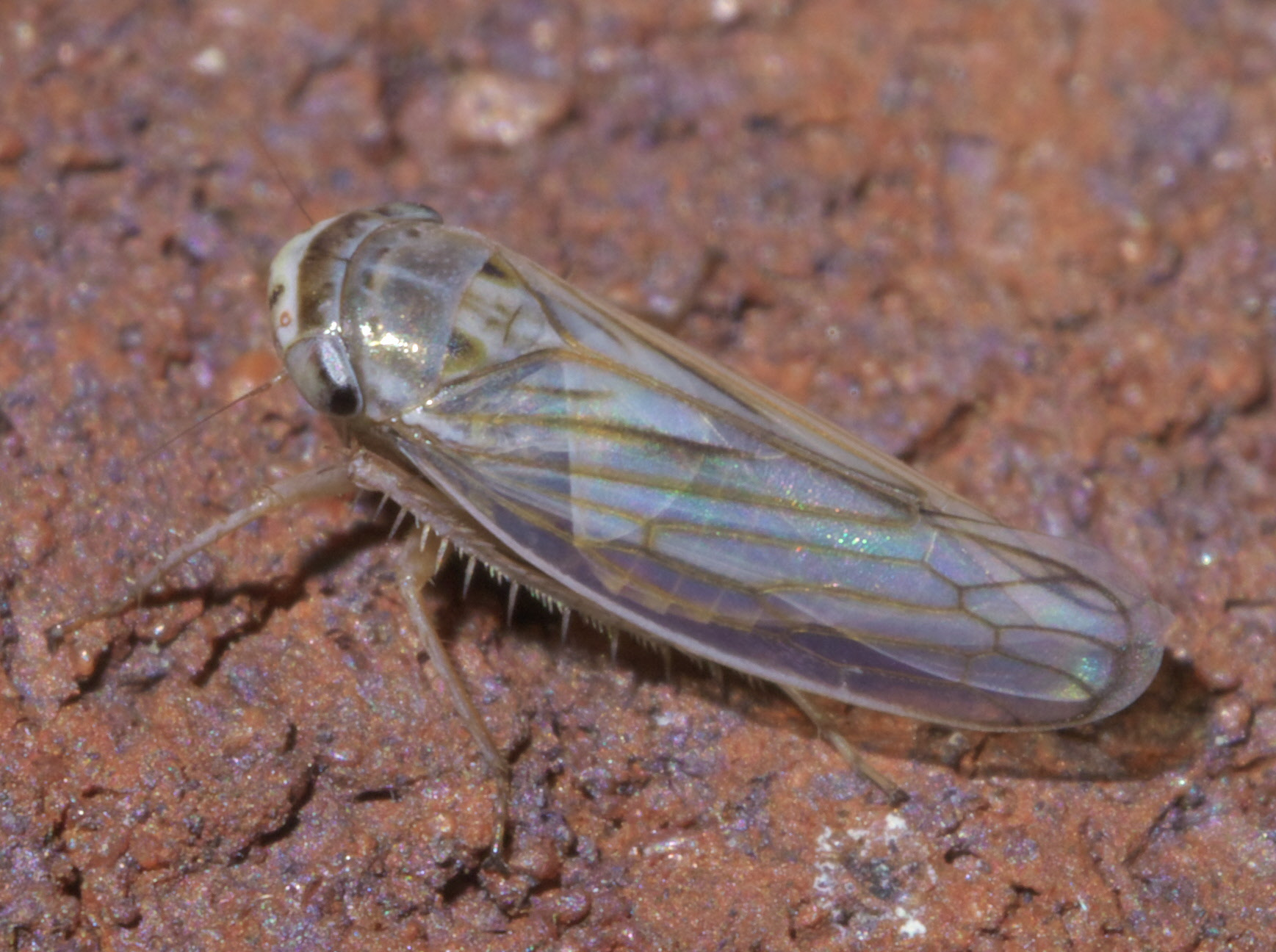
- Exitianus exitiosus

Scientific classification
- Kingdom: Animalia
- Phylum: Arthropoda
- Clade: Pancrustacea
- Class: Insecta
- Order: Hemiptera
- Suborder: Auchenorrhyncha
- Family: Cicadellidae
- Subfamily: Deltocephalinae
- Tribe: Chiasmini; Distant, 1908

Synonyms
- Doraturini Emeljanov, 1962; Listrophorini Boulard, 1971; Paraphrodini Linnavuori, 1979

= Chiasmini =

Tribe of true bugs

Chiasmini is a tribe of leafhoppers in the subfamily Deltocephalinae. Chiasmini contains 21 genera and over 300 species. Some species of Chiasmini in the genus Nephotettix are agricultural pests and transmit rice Tungrovirus in southeast Asia.

== Genera ==
The following described genera have been placed in Chiasmini:

1. Aconura Lethierry, 1876
2. Aconurella Ribaut, 1948
3. Athysanella Baker, 1898
4. Baileyus Singh-Pruthi, 1930
5. Chiasmus Mulsant & Rey, 1855 - type genus
6. Doratura Sahlberg, 1871
7. Doraturopsis Lindberg, 1935
8. Driotura Osborn & Ball, 1898
9. Exitianus Ball, 1929
10. Gurawa Distant, 1908
11. Icaia Linnavuori, 1973
12. Leofa Distant, 1918
13. Listrophora Boulard, 1971
14. Nephoris Jacobi, 1912
15. Nephotettix Matsumura, 1902
16. Omaranus Distant, 1918
17. Paraphrodes Linnavuori, 1979
18. Picchusteles Linnavuori & DeLong, 1976
19. Protochiasmus Zahniser, 2010
20. Stenogiffardia Evans, 1977
21. Zahniserius Duan & Zhang, 2012
