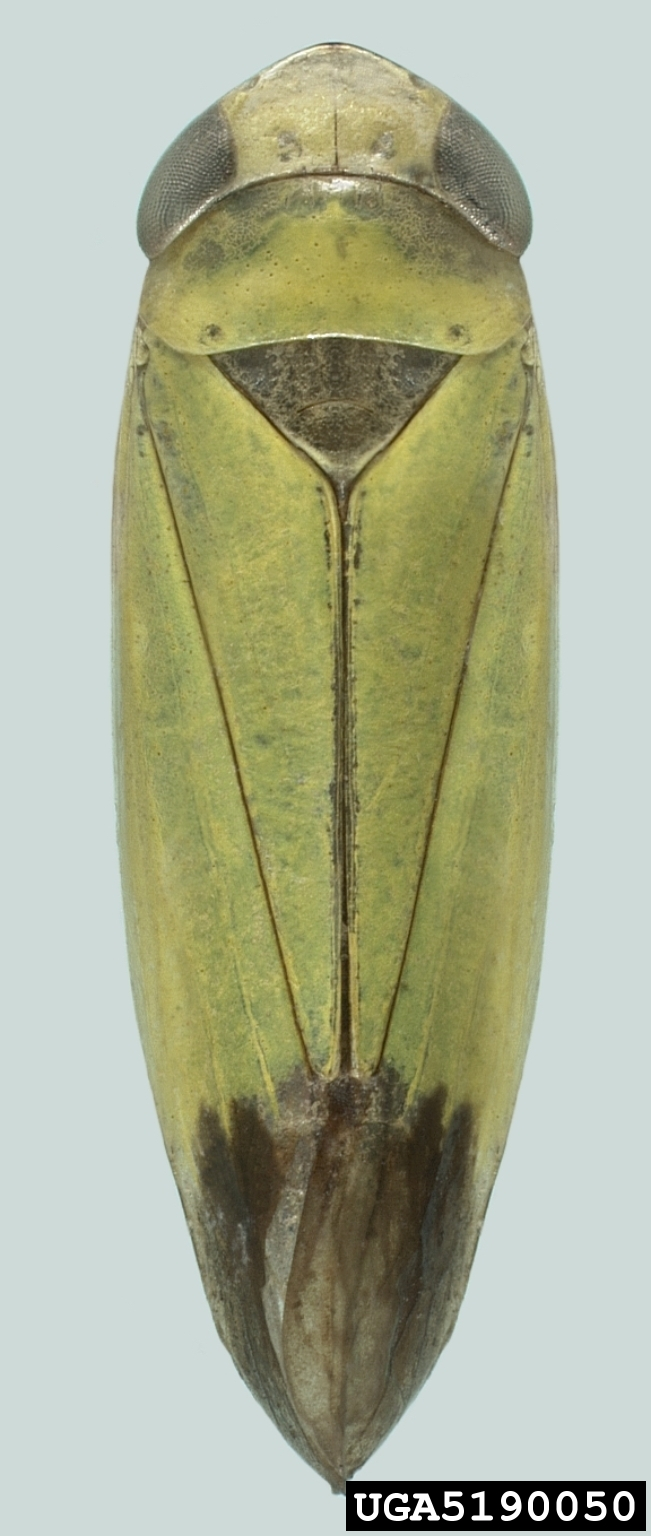
- Nephotettix cincticeps

Scientific classification
- Kingdom: Animalia
- Phylum: Arthropoda
- Clade: Pancrustacea
- Class: Insecta
- Order: Hemiptera
- Suborder: Auchenorrhyncha
- Family: Cicadellidae
- Subfamily: Deltocephalinae
- Tribe: Chiasmini
- Genus: Nephotettix; Matsumura, 1902

= Nephotettix =

Genus of true bugs

Nephotettix is a genus of leafhoppers in the subfamily Deltocephalinae and tribe Chiasmini. Species are mostly found in Asia, although two are from Africa.

Known as 'green leafhoppers' of paddy/rice, Nephotettix cincticeps and N. virescens appear to be the most important Asian pest species in this genus: as vectors of viruses, such as tungro disease in rice.

video of nymph movement

== Species ==
As of 2026 the World Auchenorrhyncha Database includes:

1. Nephotettix afer Ghauri, 1968 (southern Africa)
2. Nephotettix apicalis (Motschulsky, 1859)
3. Nephotettix cincticeps Uhler, 1896 (synonyms: various subspp. of Nephotettix apicalis and N. bipunctatus)
4. Nephotettix malayanus Ishihara & Kawase, 1968
5. Nephotettix modulatus Melichar, 1912
6. Nephotettix nigropictus (Stål, 1870) (synonym N. nigropicta)
  1. N. nigropictus yapicola Linnavuori
7. Nephotettix parvus Ishihara & Kawase, 1968
8. Nephotettix sympatricus Ghauri, 1971
9. Nephotettix virescens (Distant, 1908) (synonyms: Cicada bipunctata (Fabricius), N. impicticeps Ishihara, N. oryzii Mahmood & Aziz)

Note

- Nephotettix plebeius Kirkaldy, 1906 is now placed in genus Exitianus.
