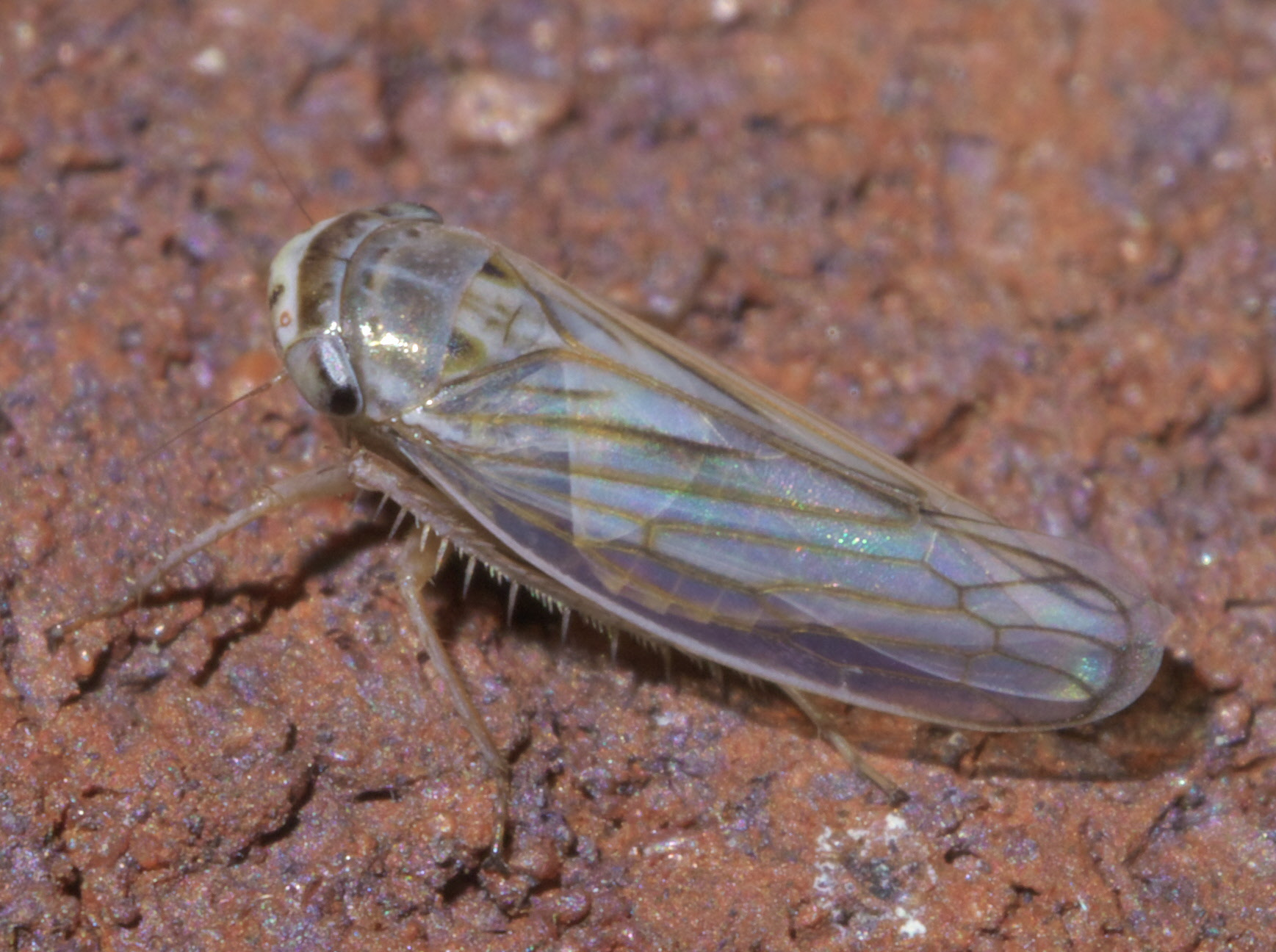

Scientific classification
- Domain: Eukaryota
- Kingdom: Animalia
- Phylum: Arthropoda
- Class: Insecta
- Order: Hemiptera
- Suborder: Auchenorrhyncha
- Family: Cicadellidae
- Subfamily: Deltocephalinae
- Genus: Exitianus
- Species: E. exitiosus

Binomial name
- Exitianus exitiosus (Uhler, 1880)

= Exitianus exitiosus =

Species of true bug

Exitianus exitiosus, the gray lawn leafhopper, is a species of leafhopper in the family Cicadellidae.

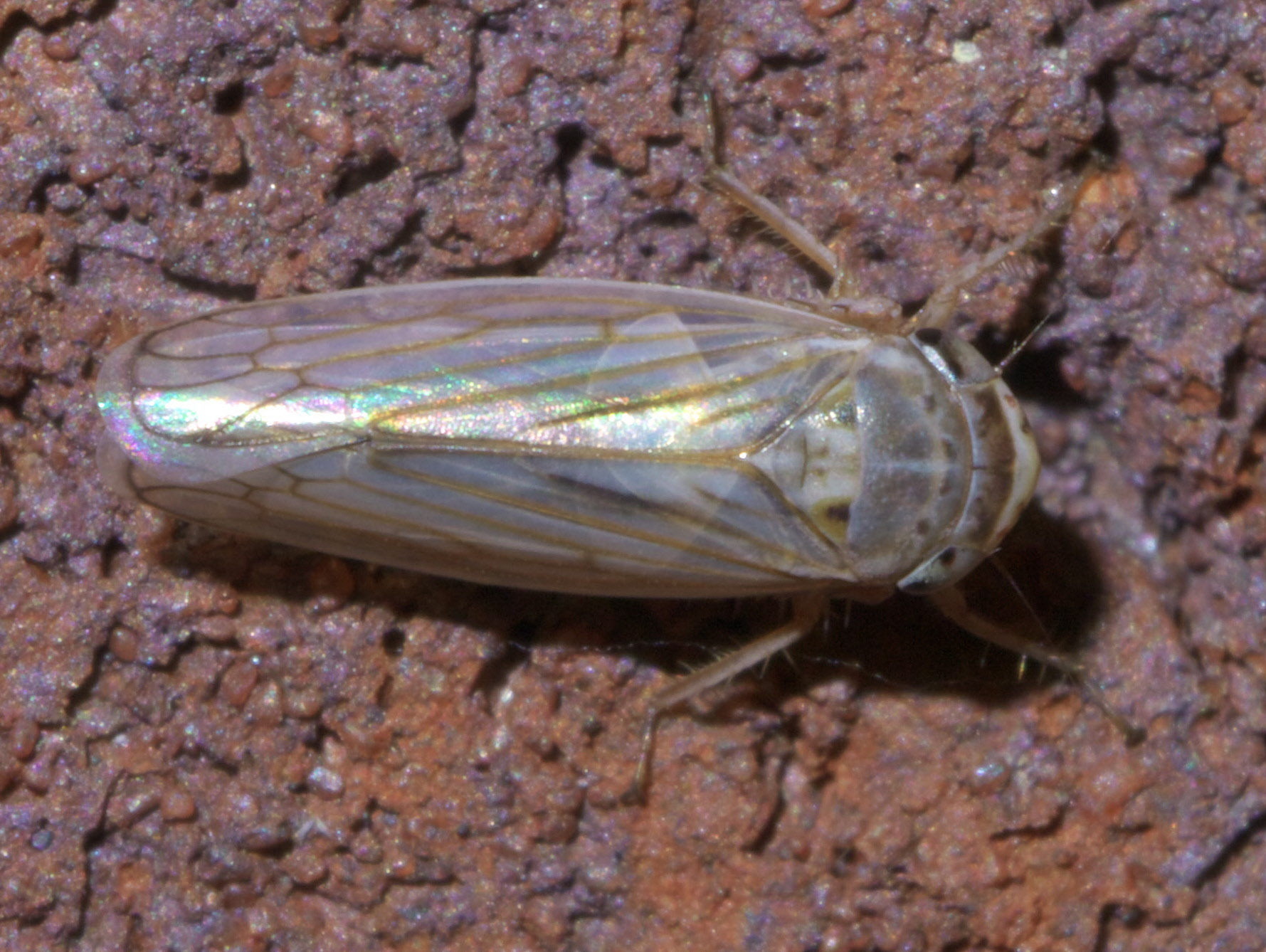
Gray lawn leafhopper, Exitianus exitiosus

== Subspecies ==
These two subspecies belong to the species Exitianus exitiosus:

- Exitianus exitiosus angustatus DeLong & Hershberger 1947
- Exitianus exitiosus pallidens DeLong & Hershberger 1947
