= Chiasmus (leafhopper) =

Scientific classification
- Kingdom: Animalia
- Phylum: Arthropoda
- Clade: Pancrustacea
- Class: Insecta
- Order: Hemiptera
- Suborder: Auchenorrhyncha
- Family: Cicadellidae
- Subfamily: Deltocephalinae
- Tribe: Chiasmini
- Genus: Chiasmus; Mulsant & Rey, 1855

Synonyms
- List: Actrotypus Fieber, 1866; Atractotypus Fieber, 1866; Attractotypus Fieber, 1866; Chiasmes Mulsant & Rey, 1855; Duranturopsis Melichar, 1908; Duratopsis Melichar, 1908; Duraturopsis Melichar, 1908; Kartwa Distant, 1908; Kosmiopelex Kirkaldy, 1906; Kosmiopelix Kirkaldy, 1906; Postumus Distant, 1918

Genus of true bugs

Chiasmus is a genus of leafhoppers in the subfamily Deltocephalinae and typical of the tribe Chiasmini; it was erected by Mulsant and Rey in 1855. Species have been recorded in Africa, southern Europe, southern Asia and Australia.

== Species ==
The Global Biodiversity Information Facility lists:

1. Chiasmus alatus Singh-Pruthi, 1930
2. Chiasmus arori Singh, 1969
3. Chiasmus conspurcatus (Perris, 1857)
4. Chiasmus curtipennis (Oshanin, 1871)
5. Chiasmus elongatus Singh, 1969
6. Chiasmus facialis (Distant, 1918)
7. Chiasmus jagdishi Singh-Pruthi, 1936
8. Chiasmus katonae (Melichar, 1908)
9. Chiasmus mustelinus (Distant, 1908)
10. Chiasmus niger Singh-Pruthi, 1936
11. Chiasmus translucidus Mulsant & Rey, 1855 - type species
12. Chiasmus undulatus Theron, 1982
13. Chiasmus uzelii Melichar, 1903
14. Chiasmus varicolor (Kirkaldy, 1906)
