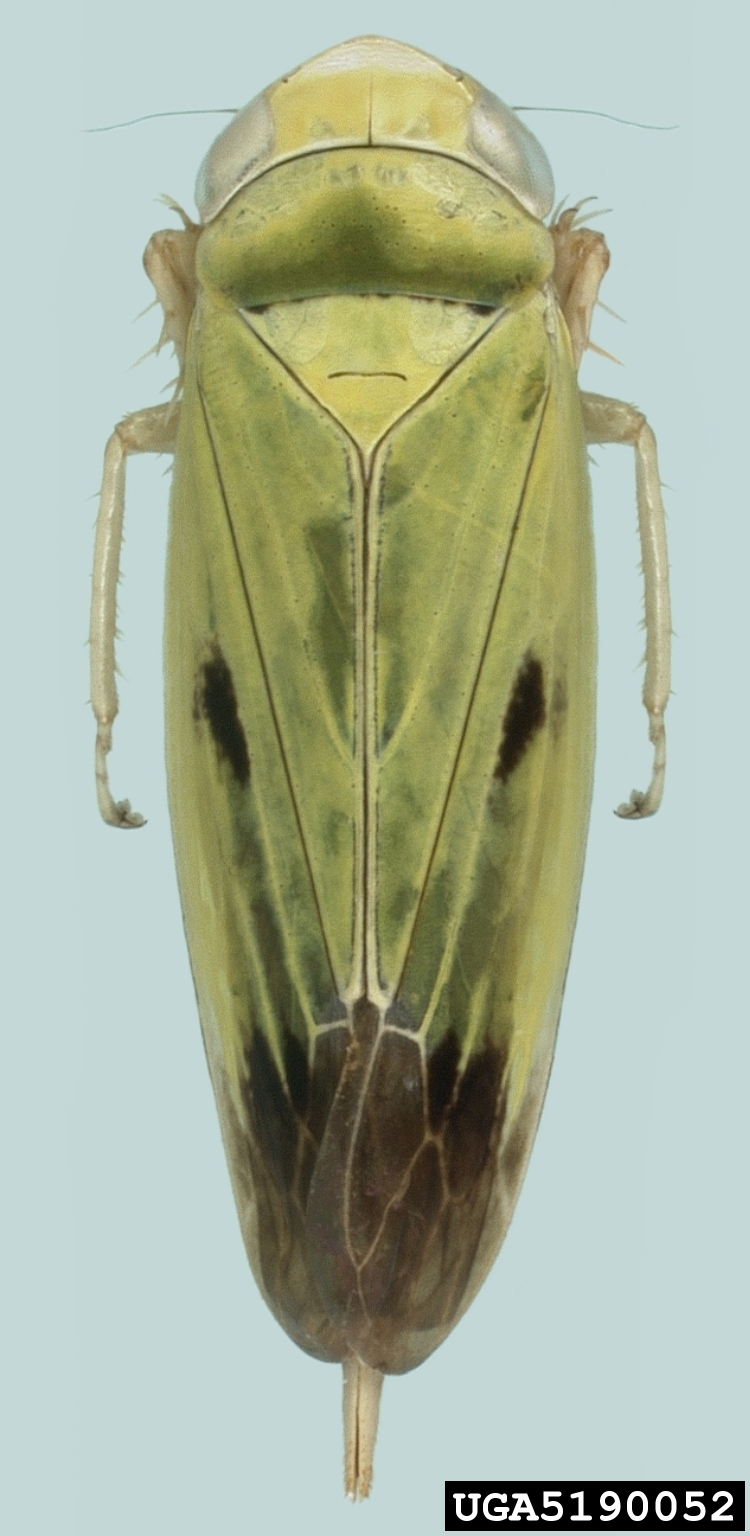

Scientific classification
- Kingdom: Animalia
- Phylum: Arthropoda
- Class: Insecta
- Order: Hemiptera
- Suborder: Auchenorrhyncha
- Family: Cicadellidae
- Genus: Nephotettix
- Species: N. virescens

Binomial name
- Nephotettix virescens (Distant, 1908)

= Nephotettix virescens =

Species of true bug

Nephotettix virescens is a species of true bug in the family Cicadellidae. It is a pest of millets. It is found in eastern India as well as Southeast Asia, including China. It is found in Guam as well.
