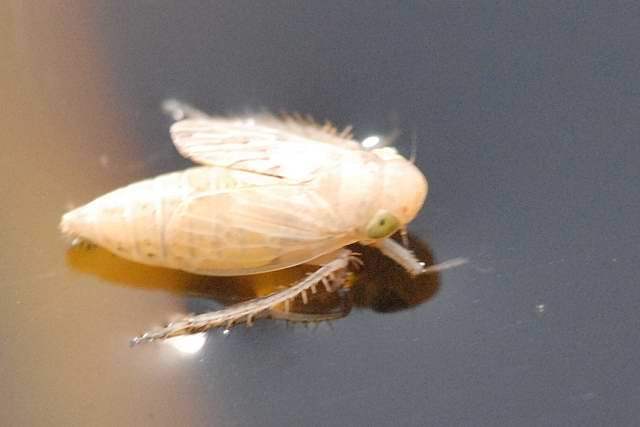
- Doratura impudica

Scientific classification
- Kingdom: Animalia
- Phylum: Arthropoda
- Class: Insecta
- Order: Hemiptera
- Suborder: Auchenorrhyncha
- Family: Cicadellidae
- Tribe: Chiasmini
- Genus: Doratura; Sahlberg, 1871

= Doratura =

Genus of true bugs

Doratura is a genus of Palaearctic and Nearctic realm leafhoppers belonging to the tribe Chiasmini.

== Species ==
Doratura contains 29 species, found in Europe, Central Asia, northern Africa, and Northern America.

- Doratura arenicola (Logvinenko, 1975)
- Doratura astrachanica (Vilbaste, 1961)
- Doratura butzele (Guglielmino & Bückle, 2021)
- Doratura caucasia (Melichar, 1913)
- Doratura concors (Horváth, 1903)
- Doratura exilis (Horváth, 1903)
- Doratura gravis (Emeljanov, 1966)
- Doratura heterophyla (Horváth, 1903)
- Doratura homophyla (Flor, 1861)
- Doratura horvathi (Wagner, 1939)
- Doratura iblea (D'Urso, 1983)
- Doratura impudica (Horváth, 1897)
- Doratura ivanovi (Kusnezov, 1928)
- Doratura jole (Guglielmino & Bückle, 2022)
- Doratura kusnezovi (Vilbaste, 1961)
- Doratura littoralis (Kuntze, 1937)
- Doratura lobele (Guglielmino & Bückle, 2022)
- Doratura lukjanovitshi (Kusnezov, 1929)
- Doratura marandica (Dlabola, 1981)
- Doratura medvedevi (Logvinenko, 1961)
- Doratura paludosa (Melichar, 1897)
- Doratura rikele (Guglielmino & Bückle, 2022)
- Doratura rosele (Guglielmino & Bückle, 2022)
- Doratura rusaevi (Kusnezov, 1928)
- Doratura salina (Horváth, 1903)
- Doratura stylata (Boheman, 1847)
- Doratura vefele (Guglielmino & Bückle, 2022)
- Doratura veneta (Dlabola, 1959)
