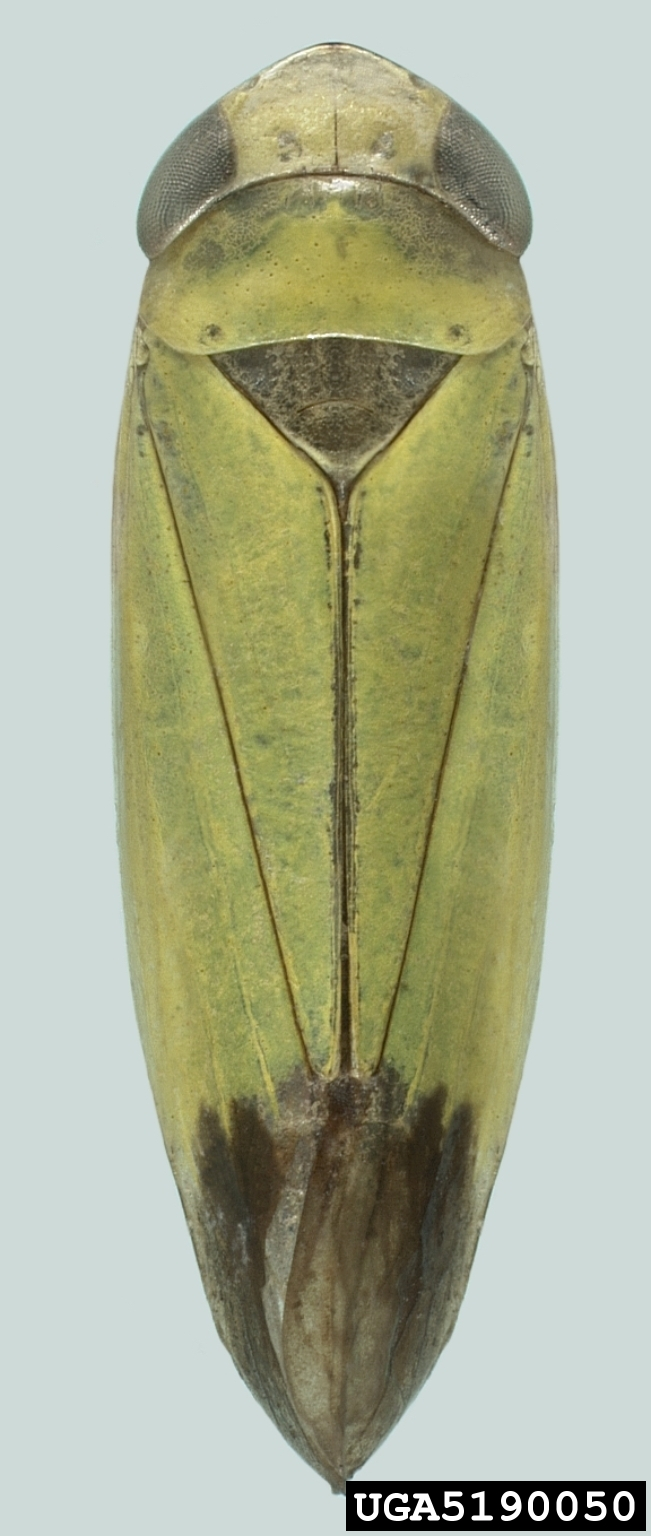

Scientific classification
- Kingdom: Animalia
- Phylum: Arthropoda
- Class: Insecta
- Order: Hemiptera
- Suborder: Auchenorrhyncha
- Family: Cicadellidae
- Genus: Nephotettix
- Species: N. cincticeps

Binomial name
- Nephotettix cincticeps Uhler, 1896

Synonyms
- Nephotettix apicalis subsp. cincticeps (Uhler, 1896); Nephotettix bipunctatus subsp. cincticeps (Uhler, 1896); Paramesus cincticeps (Uhler, 1896); Selenocephalus cincticeps Uhler, 1896

= Nephotettix cincticeps =

Species of true bug

Nephotettix cincticeps, the rice green leafhopper, is a species of true bug in the family Cicadellidae. It is a vector of virus diseases in rice and also a pest of barnyard millet. It is a key insect vector transmitting rice dwarf virus (RDV) that causes rice dwarf disease.
