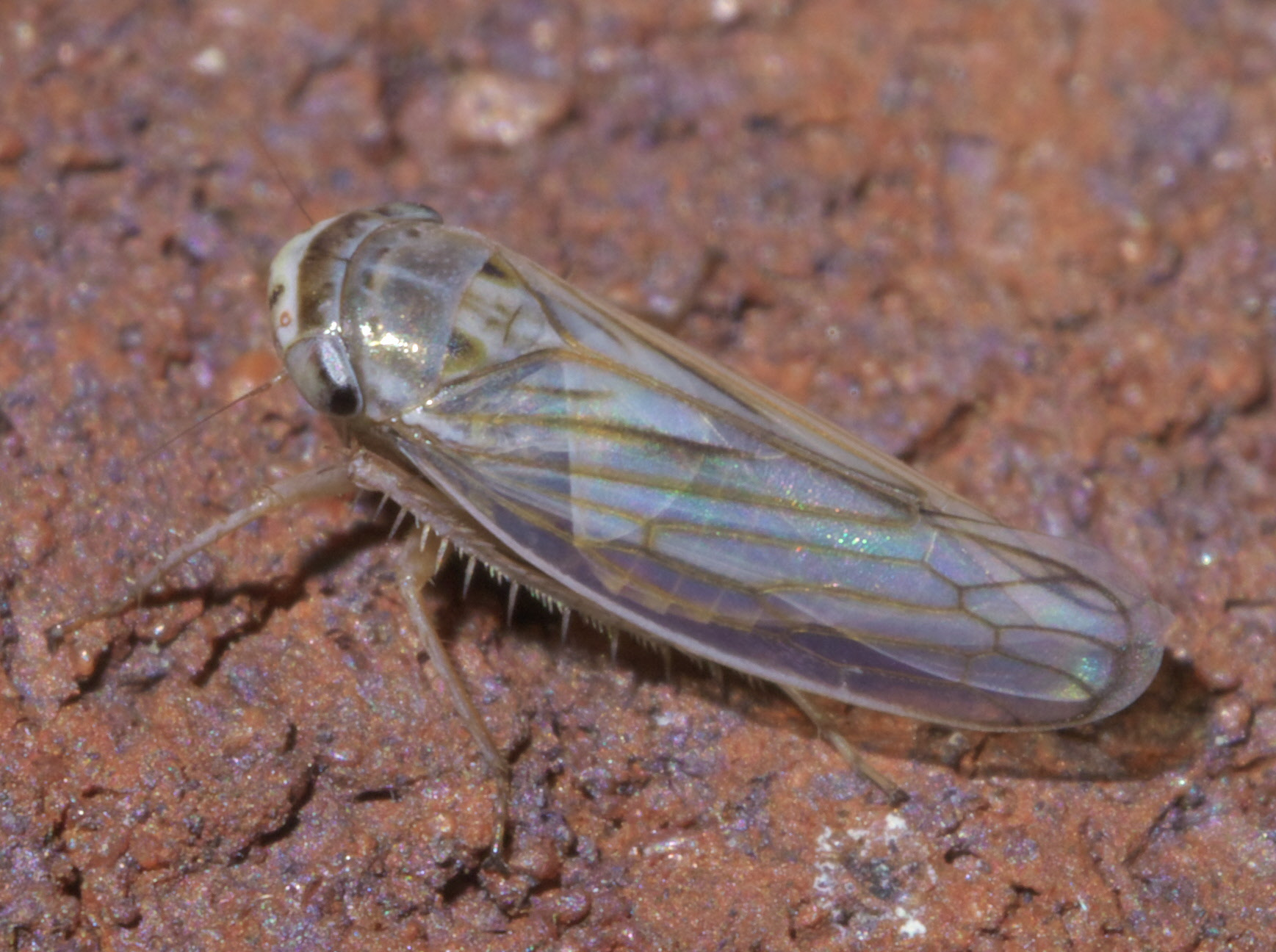
- Exitianus exitiosus

Scientific classification
- Domain: Eukaryota
- Kingdom: Animalia
- Phylum: Arthropoda
- Class: Insecta
- Order: Hemiptera
- Suborder: Auchenorrhyncha
- Family: Cicadellidae
- Subfamily: Deltocephalinae
- Genus: Exitianus; Ball, 1929

= Exitianus =

Genus of true bugs

Exitianus is a genus of leafhoppers in the family Cicadellidae. There are more than 50 described species in Exitianus.

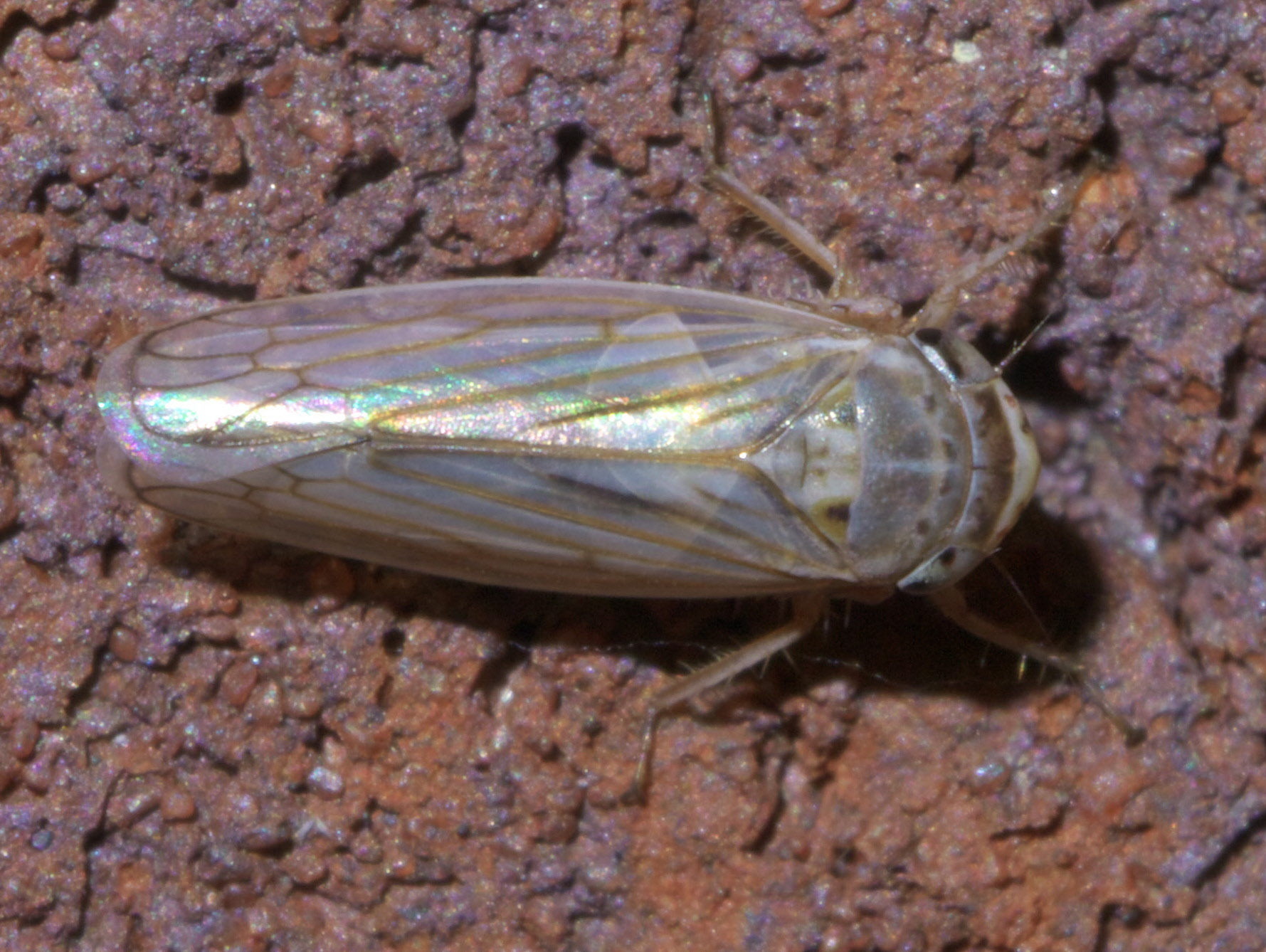
Exitianus exitiosus

== Species ==
These 52 species belong to the genus Exitianus:

- Exitianus abruptus DeLong & Hershberger, 1947
- Exitianus africanus Walker, 1851
- Exitianus angulatus DeLong & Hershberger, 1947
- Exitianus apophysiosus Zahniser, 2008
- Exitianus apophysisiosus Zahniser, 2008
- Exitianus arenaceus Villiers, 1956
- Exitianus armus Ball
- Exitianus atratus Linnavuori, 1959
- Exitianus attenuatus Ross, 1968
- Exitianus brevis DeLong & Hershberger, 1947
- Exitianus brunneopictus Zanol, 1987
- Exitianus capicola Stål, 1855
- Exitianus centralis Ghauri, 1974
- Exitianus coronatus Distant, 1918
- Exitianus curvipenis Ghauri, 1972
- Exitianus distanti Ross, 1968
- Exitianus evansi McKamey & Hicks, 2007
- Exitianus excavatus DeLong & Hershberger, 1947
- Exitianus exitiosa Uhler, 1880
- Exitianus exitiosus (Uhler, 1880) (gray lawn leafhopper)
- Exitianus fasciolatus (Melichar, 1911)
- Exitianus frontalis Distant, 1917
- Exitianus fusconervosus Motschulsky, 1863
- Exitianus ghaurii Zahniser, 2008
- Exitianus greensladei Ross, 1968
- Exitianus indicus Distant, 1908
- Exitianus karachiensis Ahmed & M., 1986
- Exitianus kinoanus Ball
- Exitianus kumaonis Baker, 1925
- Exitianus luctuosus Stål, 1895
- Exitianus major Ahmed, M. & Qadeer
- Exitianus minor Ahmed, M. & Qadeer
- Exitianus mucronatus Ross, 1968
- Exitianus nanus Distant, 1908
- Exitianus natalensis Ross, 1968
- Exitianus nigrens DeLong & Hershberger, 1947
- Exitianus obscurinervis Stål, 1859
- Exitianus occidentalis Ghauri, 1974
- Exitianus okahandia Ross, 1968
- Exitianus peshawarensis Ahmed, M. & Rao, 1986
- Exitianus picatus (Gibson, 1919)
- Exitianus plebeius Kirkaldy, 1906
- Exitianus pondus Ross, 1968
- Exitianus quadratulus Osborn, 1923
- Exitianus selbyi Evans, 1938
- Exitianus simillimus Matsumura, 1914
- Exitianus spinosus Zanol, 1987
- Exitianus transversalis Matsumura, 1908
- Exitianus tricolor DeLong & Hershberger, 1947
- Exitianus turneri Ross, 1968
- Exitianus upenis Ghauri, 1972
- Exitianus zuluensis Ross, 1968
