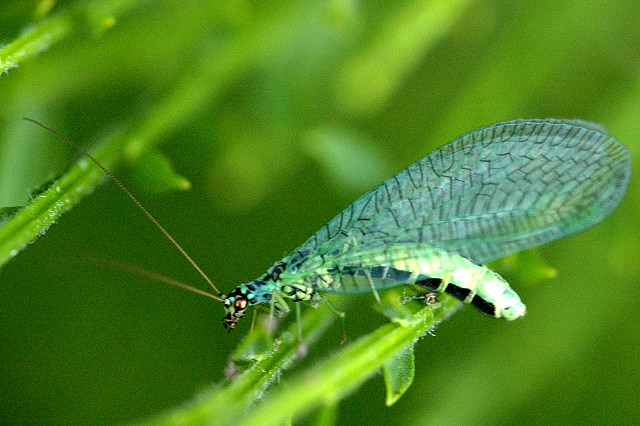
- Chrysopa perla (Chrysopini)

Scientific classification
- Kingdom: Animalia
- Phylum: Arthropoda
- Class: Insecta
- Order: Neuroptera
- Family: Chrysopidae
- Subfamily: Chrysopinae; Esben-Petersen, 1918

Diversity
- About 60 genera

= Chrysopinae =

Subfamily of lacewings

Chrysopinae is the nominate subfamily of green lacewings in the insect family Chrysopidae in the order Neuroptera. This subfamily is also the largest within the family and comprises about 60 genera.

Members of the genus Chrysoperla and the genus Chrysopa in this subfamily are common in Europe and North America. Chrysopinae larvae are predatory and feed on aphids; some of these species have been used in biological pest control, as has the Australian Mallada signatus.

== Genera ==
The following genera are divided into four tribes:

=== Ankylopterygini Navas, 1910 ===
- Ankylopteryx Brauer, 1864
- Chrysopidia Navás, 1911
- Parankylopteryx Tjeder, 1966
- Retipenna Brooks, 1986
- Semachrysa Brooks, 1983
- Signochrysa Brooks & Barnard, 1990

=== Belonopterygini Navas, 1913 ===
- Abachrysa Banks, 1938
- Belonopteryx Gerstaecker, 1863
- Calochrysa Banks, 1943
- Chrysacanthia Lacroix, 1923
- Chrysaloysia Navas, 1928
- Dysochrysa Tjeder, 1966
- Evanochrysa Brooks & Barnard, 1990
- Italochrysa Principi, 1946
- Nacarina Navás, 1915
- Nesochrysa Navás, 1910
- Nodochrysa Banks, 1938
- Oyochrysa Brooks, 1985
- Stigmachrysa Navás, 1925
- Turnerochrysa Kimmins, 1935
- Vieira Navás, 1913

=== Chrysopini Schneider, 1851 ===
Selected genera:

- Apertochrysa Tjeder, 1966 (syn Pseudomallada)
- Austrochrysa Esben-Petersen, 1928
- Ceraeochrysa Adams, 1982
- Chrysopa Leach in Brewster, 1815
- Chrysoperla Steinmann, 1964
- Cunctochrysa Hölzel, 1970
- Eremochrysa Banks, 1903
- Kymachyrsa Tauber & Garland, 2014
- Mallada Navás, 1925
- Nineta Navás, 1912
- Suarius Navás, 1914
- Titanochrysa Sosa and Freitas, 2012
- Yumachrysa Banks, 1950

=== Leucochrysini Adams, 1978 ===
- Berchmansus Navás, 1913
- Cacarulla Navas, 1910
- Gonzaga Navás, 1913
- Leucochrysa McLachlan, 1868 (syn Nodita)
- Neula Navás, 1917
- Nuvol Navás, 1916
- Santocellus Tauber & Albuquerque, 2008

=== Tribe incertae sedis ===
- †Paleochrysopa Séméria & Nel, 1990 (Eocene, France)
- †Pseudosencera Makarkin et al., 2018 (Eocene, Europe)

== Gallery ==
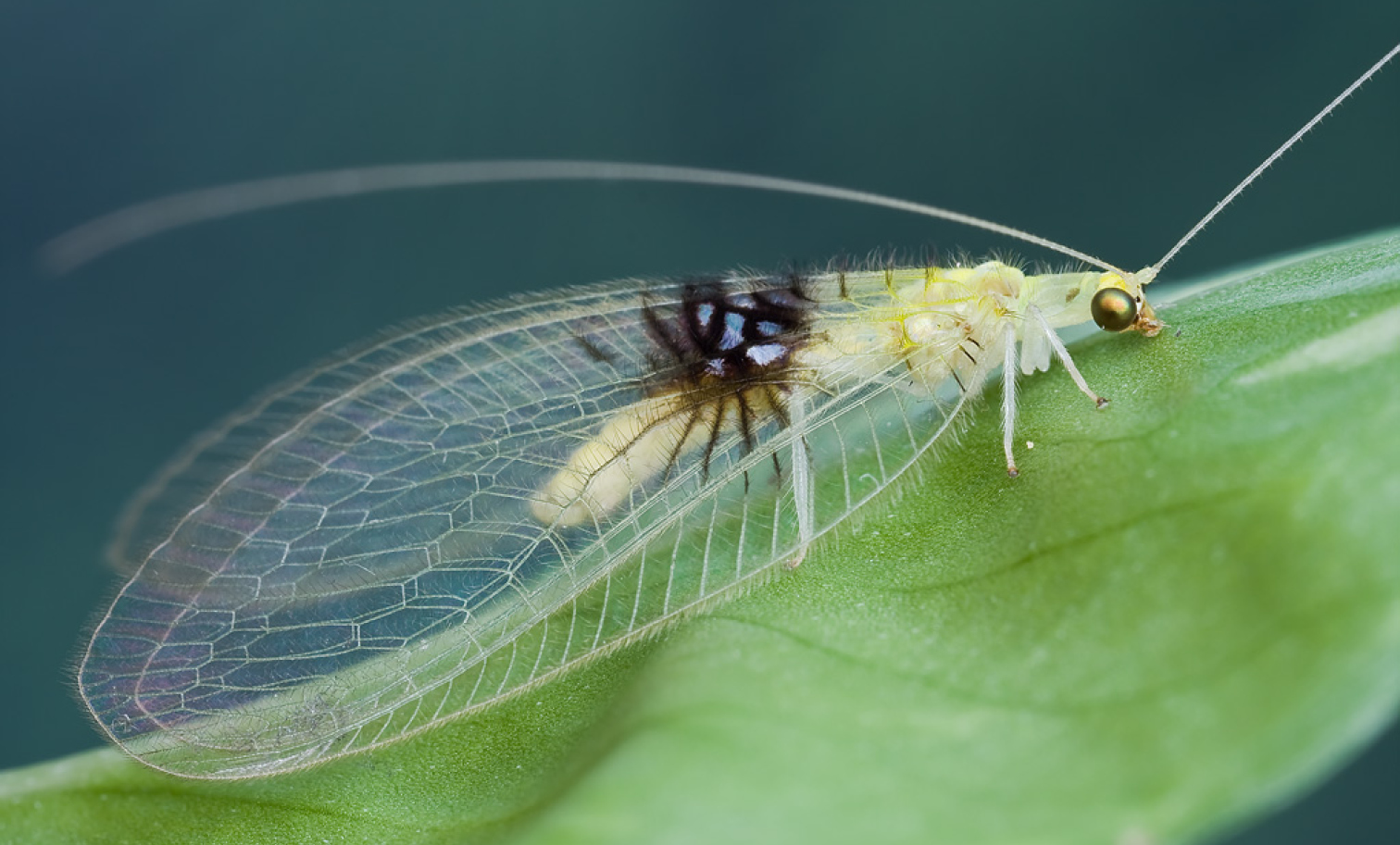
Semachrysa jade
(Ankylopterygini)

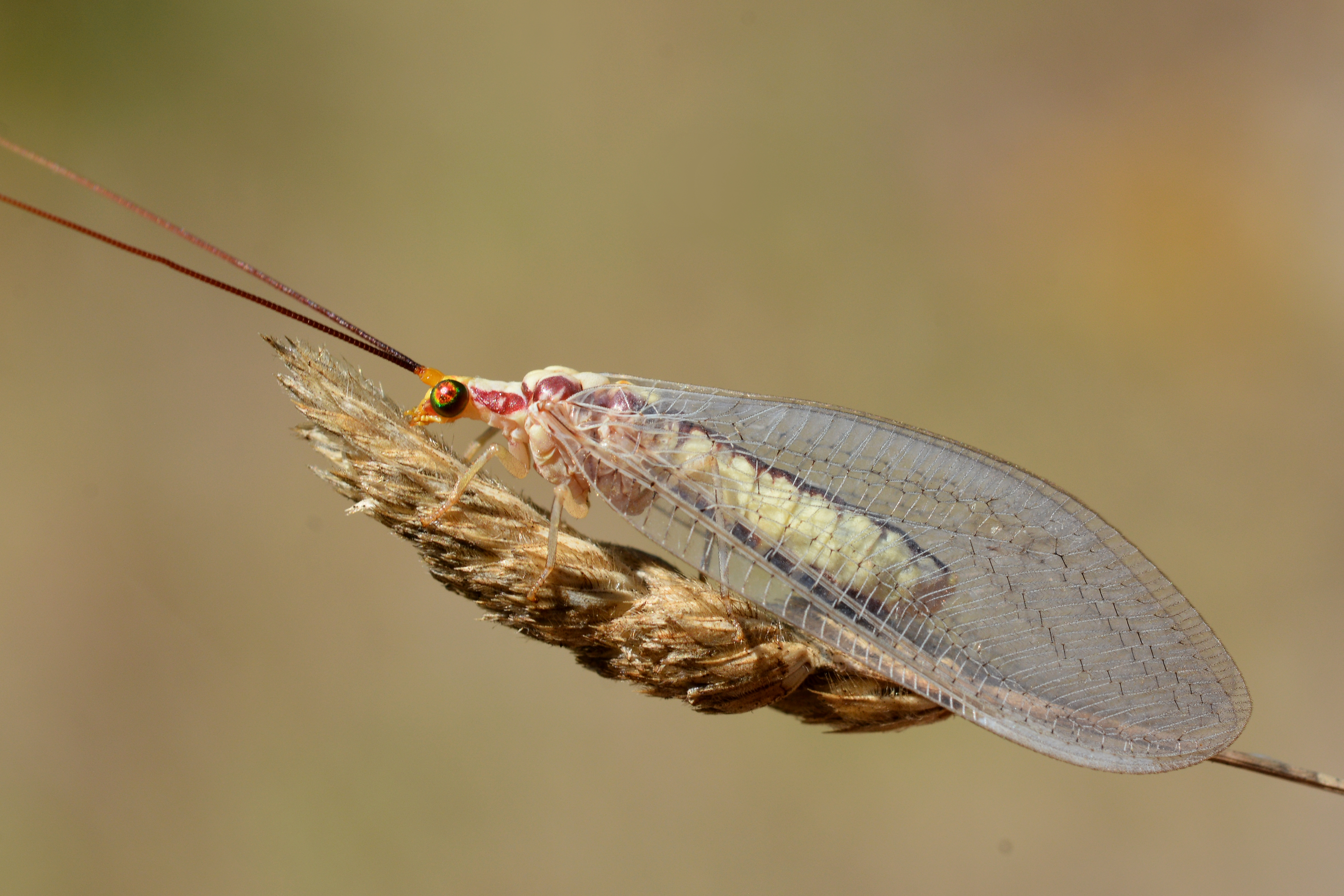
Italochrysa italica
(Belonopterygini)

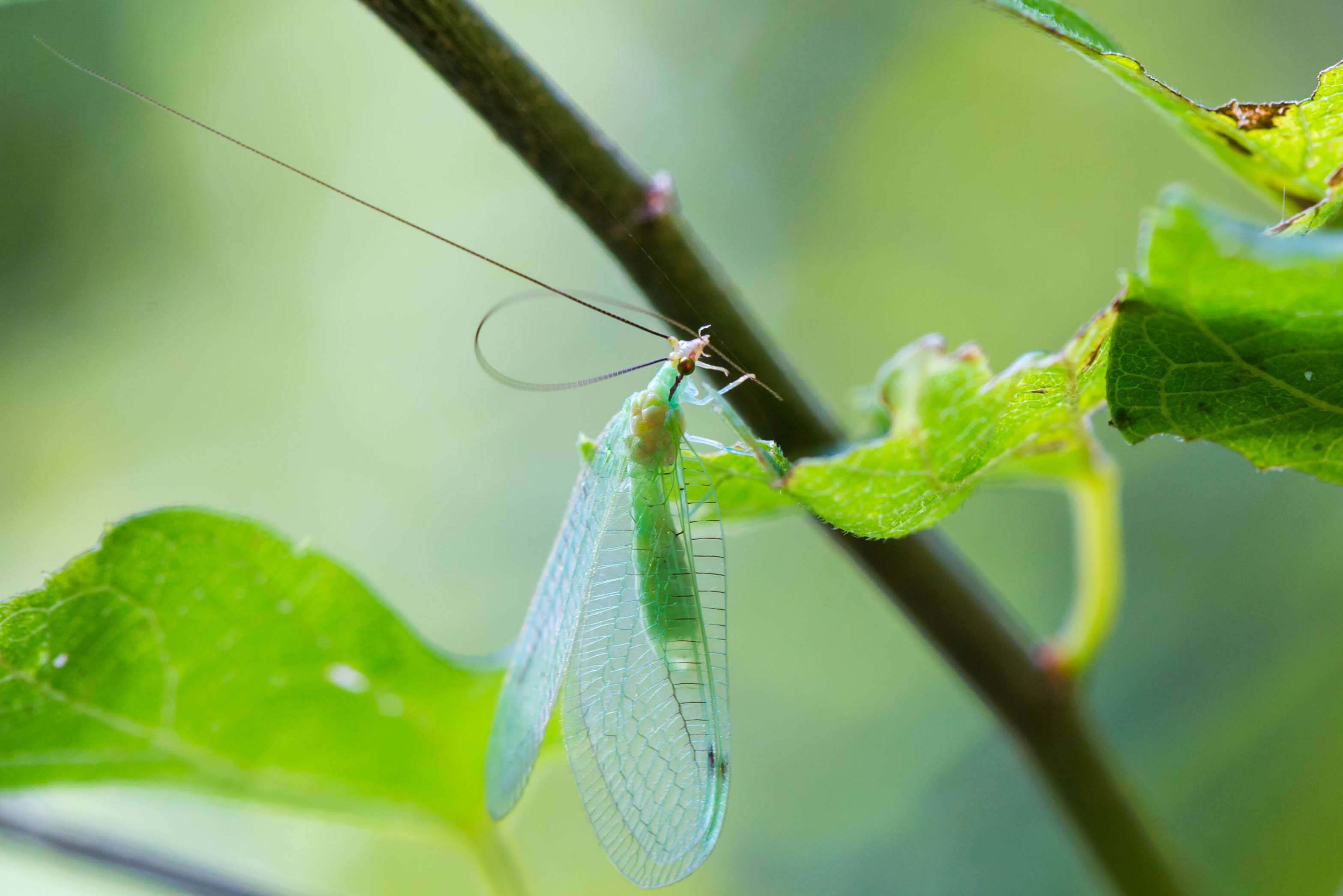
Leucochrysa pavida
(Leucochrysini)

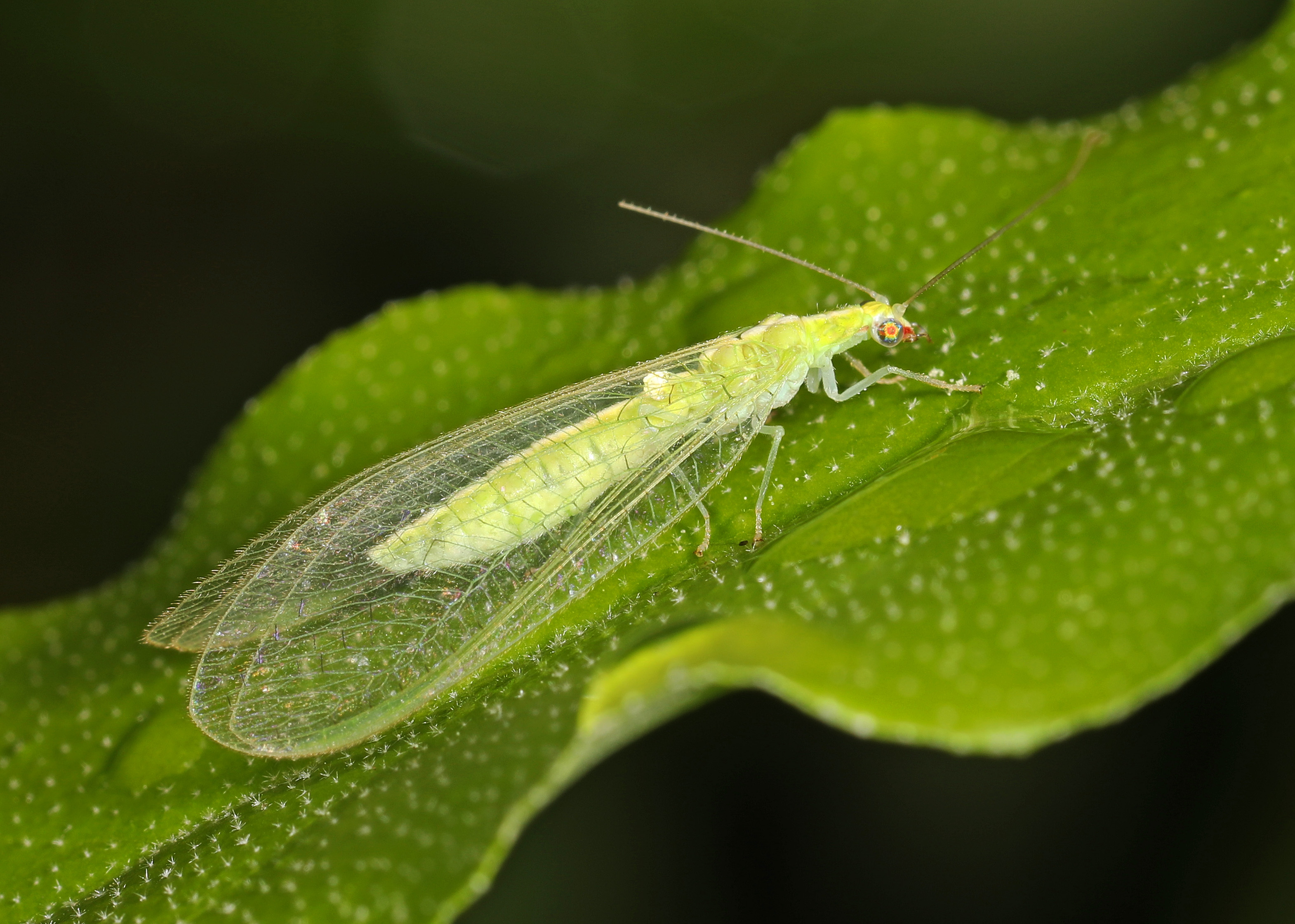
Chrysoperla rufilabris
(Chrysopini)
