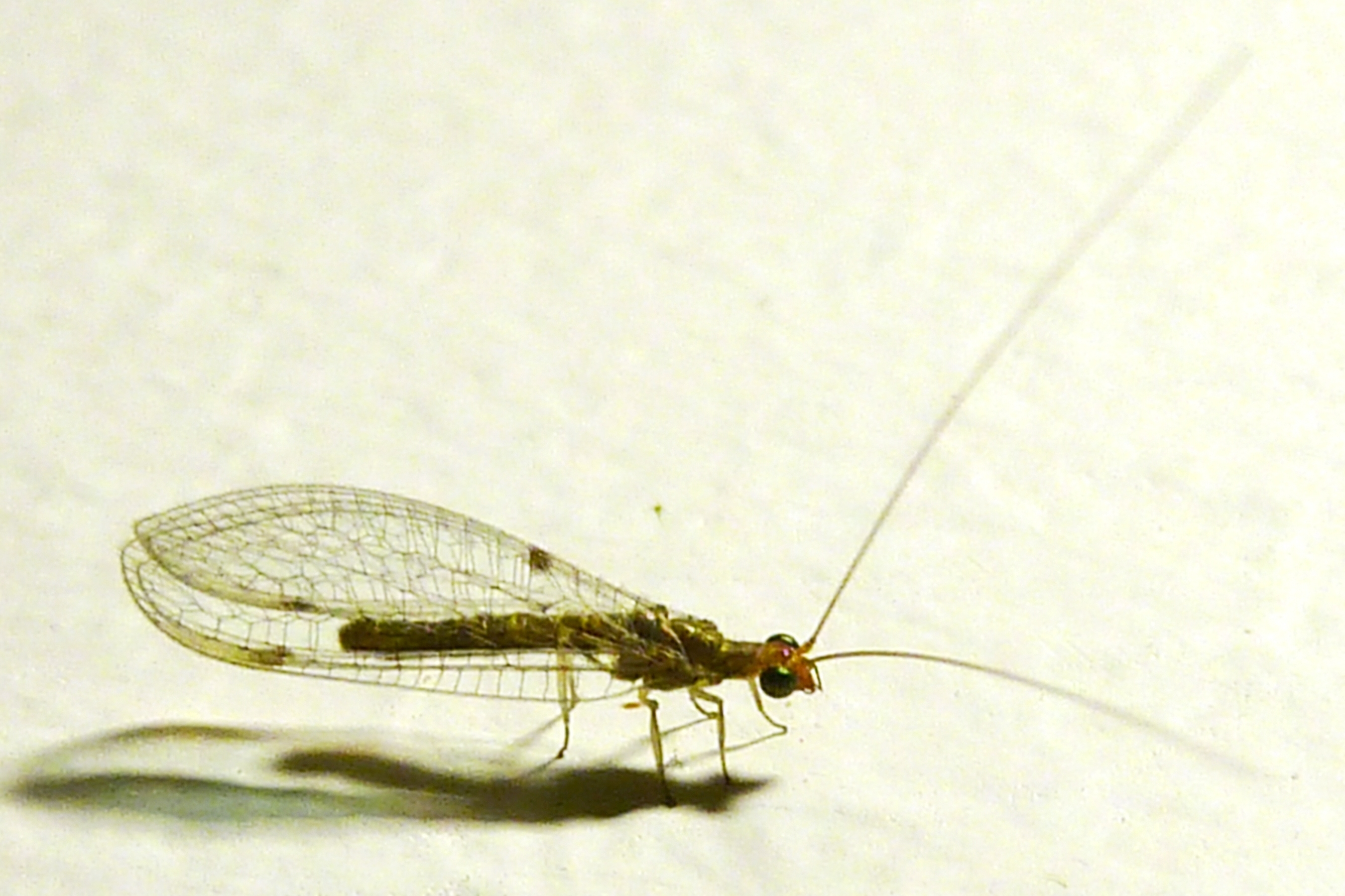
- Chrysemosa jeanneli

Scientific classification
- Kingdom: Animalia
- Phylum: Arthropoda
- Clade: Pancrustacea
- Class: Insecta
- Order: Neuroptera
- Family: Chrysopidae
- Subfamily: Chrysopinae
- Tribe: Chrysopini
- Genus: Chrysemosa; Brooks & Barnard, 1990

= Chrysemosa =

Genus of lacewings

Chrysemosa is a genus of green lacewings in the family Chrysopidae. They are distinguished from related genera based on male genital structures. The small and distinctive C. jeanneli is a commonly encountered species in orchards, fields and gardens of southern Africa.

== Species ==
- Chrysemosa andresi (Navas, 1915)
- Chrysemosa commixta (Tjeder, 1966)
- Chrysemosa jeanneli (Navás, 1914)
- Chrysemosa laristana (Hölzel, [1982])
- Chrysemosa mosconica (Navás, [1931])
- Chrysemosa parva (Tjeder, 1966)
- Chrysemosa piresi (Hölzel & Ohm, 1982)
- Chrysemosa senegalensis Hölzel et al., 1994
- Chrysemosa sodomensis (Hölzel, [1982])
- Chrysemosa stigmata (Navás, 1936)
- Chrysemosa umbralis (Navas, 1933)
