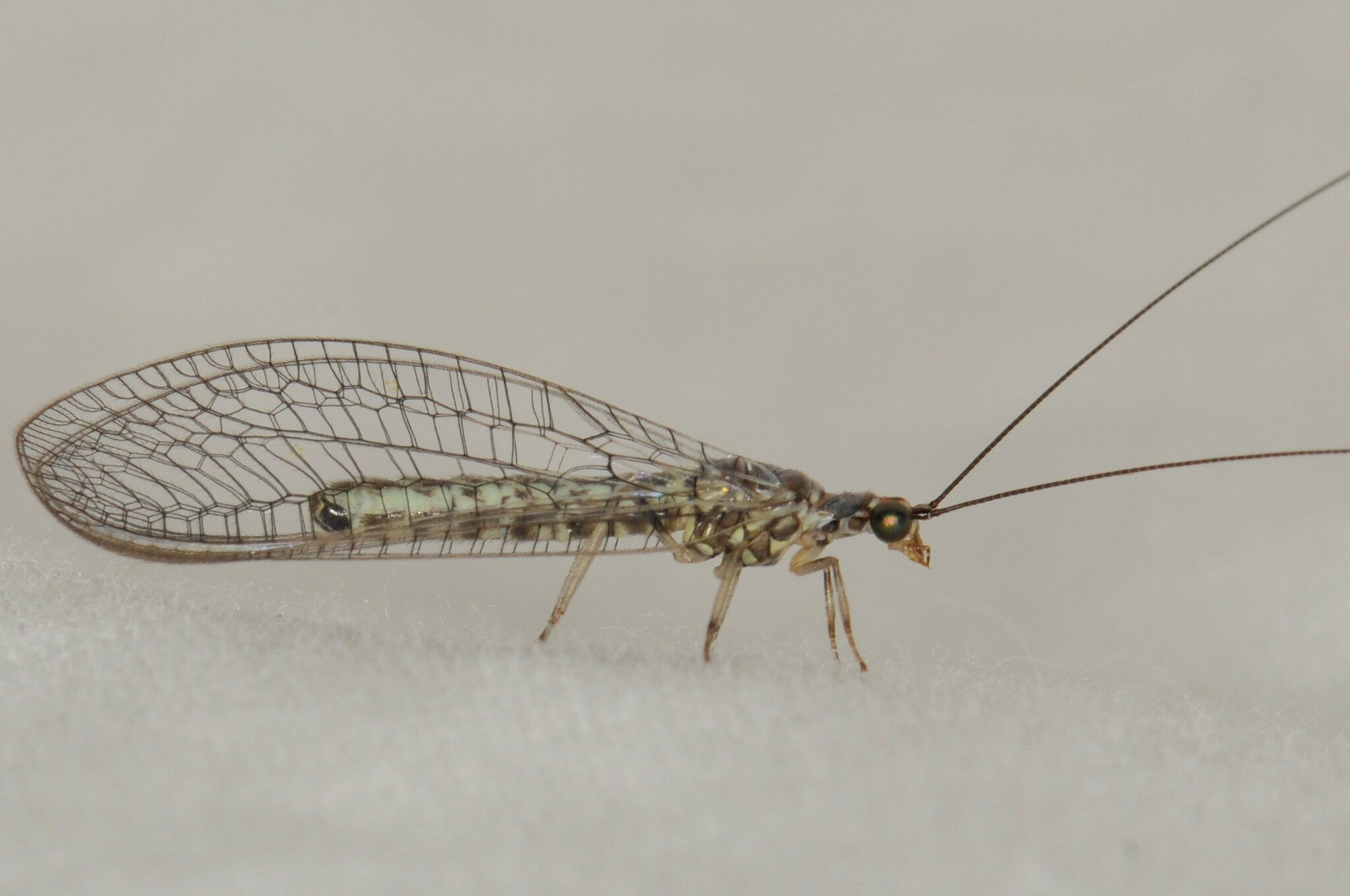

Scientific classification
- Domain: Eukaryota
- Kingdom: Animalia
- Phylum: Arthropoda
- Class: Insecta
- Order: Neuroptera
- Family: Chrysopidae
- Tribe: Chrysopini
- Genus: Yumachrysa
- Species: Y. apache

Binomial name
- Yumachrysa apache (Banks, 1938)

= Yumachrysa apache =

Species of lacewing

Yumachrysa apache is a species of green lacewing in the family Chrysopidae. It is found in North America.
