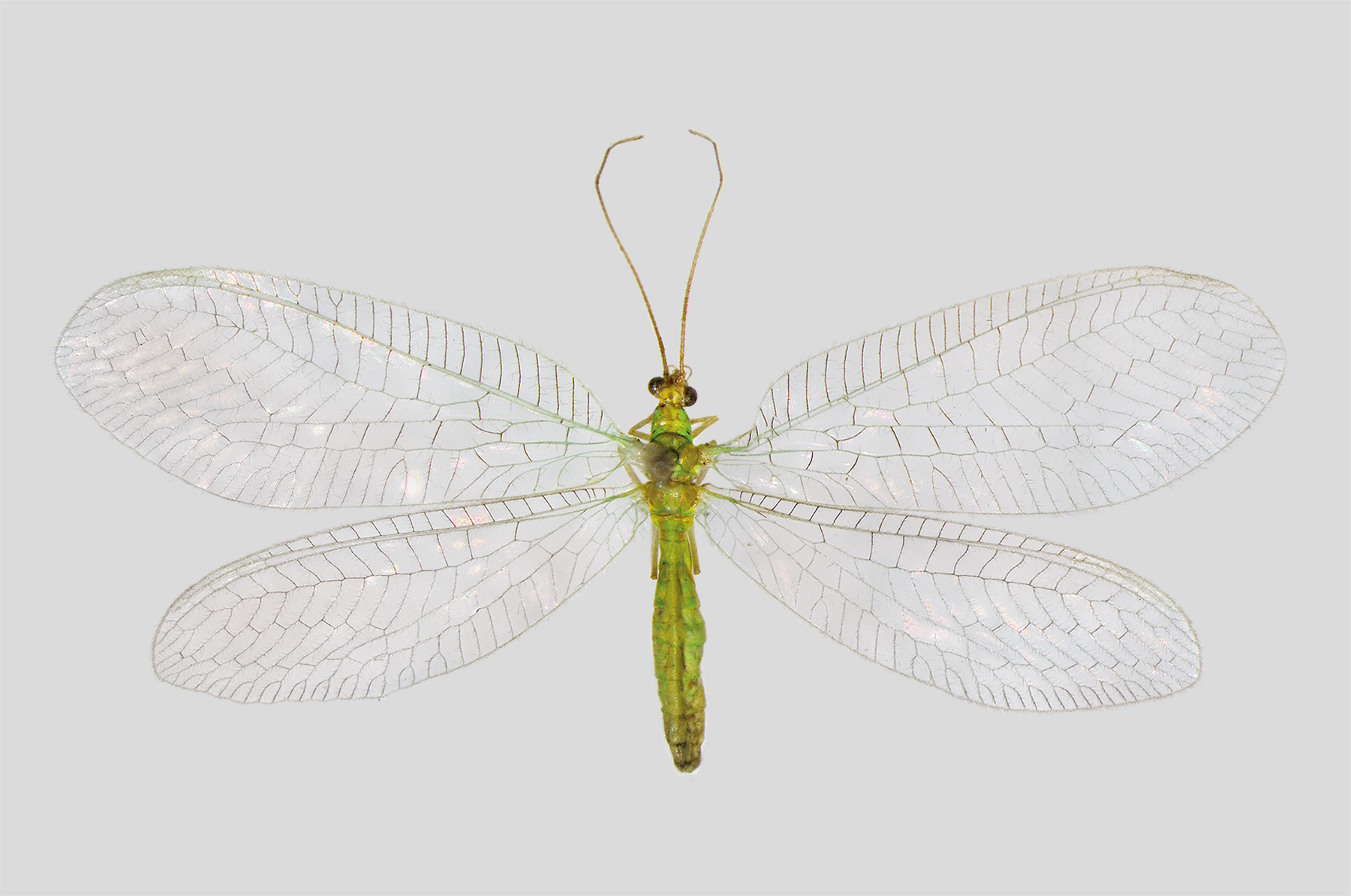
- Chrysotropia ciliata

Scientific classification
- Domain: Eukaryota
- Kingdom: Animalia
- Phylum: Arthropoda
- Class: Insecta
- Order: Neuroptera
- Family: Chrysopidae
- Genus: Chrysotropia; Navàs, 1911

= Chrysotropia =

Genus of insects

Chrysotropia is a genus of insects belonging to the family Chrysopidae.

Species:

- Chrysotropia ciliata
