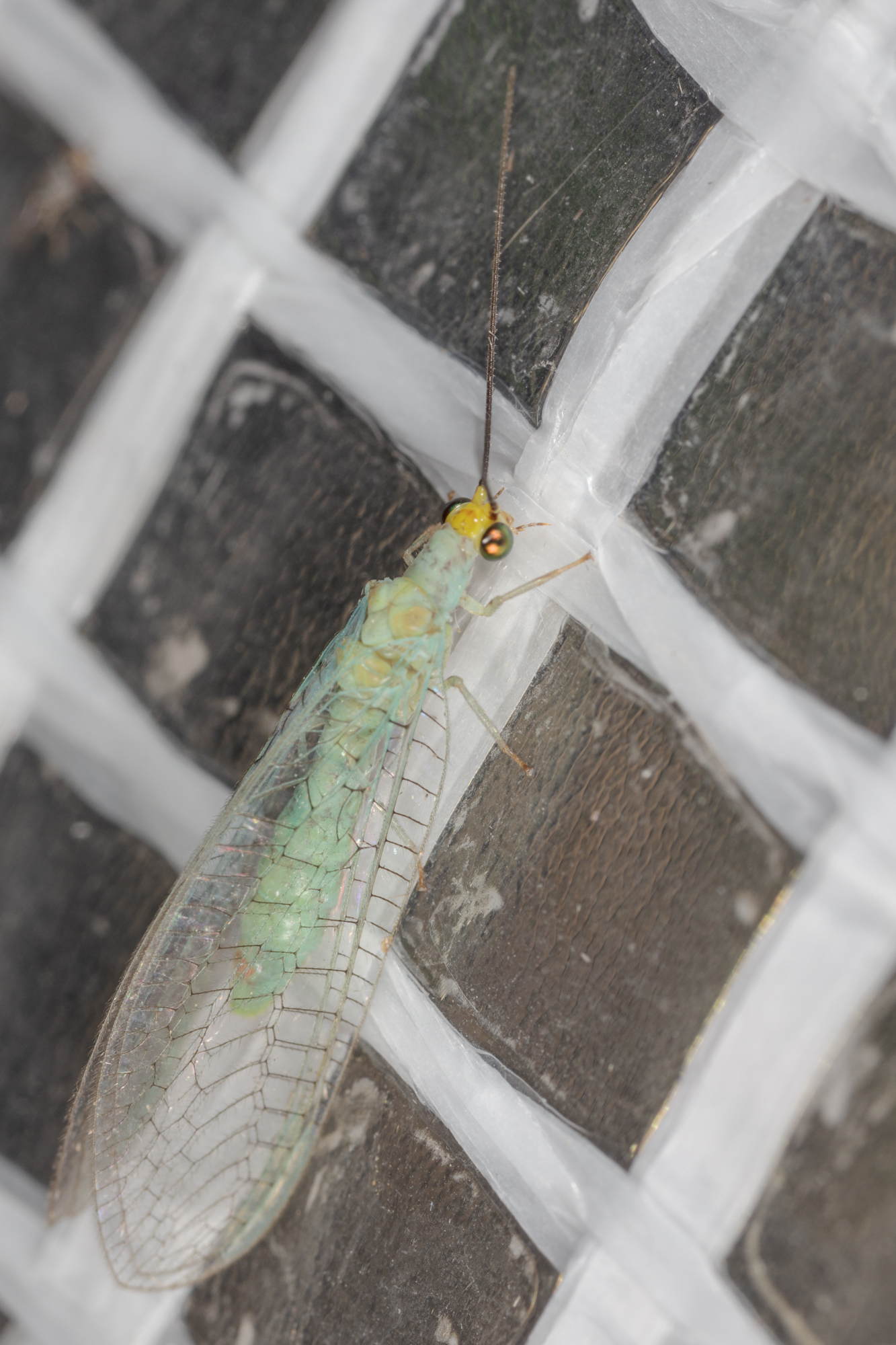

Scientific classification
- Domain: Eukaryota
- Kingdom: Animalia
- Phylum: Arthropoda
- Class: Insecta
- Order: Neuroptera
- Family: Chrysopidae
- Subfamily: Chrysopinae
- Tribe: Chrysopini
- Genus: Yumachrysa; Banks, 1950

= Yumachrysa =

Genus of lacewings

Yumachrysa is a genus of green lacewings in the family Chrysopidae. There are four described species in Yumachrysa found from the southwestern United States and Mexico.

== Species ==
These four species belong to the genus Yumachrysa:

- Yumachrysa apache (Banks, 1938)
- Yumachrysa clarivena (Banks, 1950)
- Yumachrysa incerta (Banks, 1895)
- Yumachrysa yuma (Banks, 1950)
