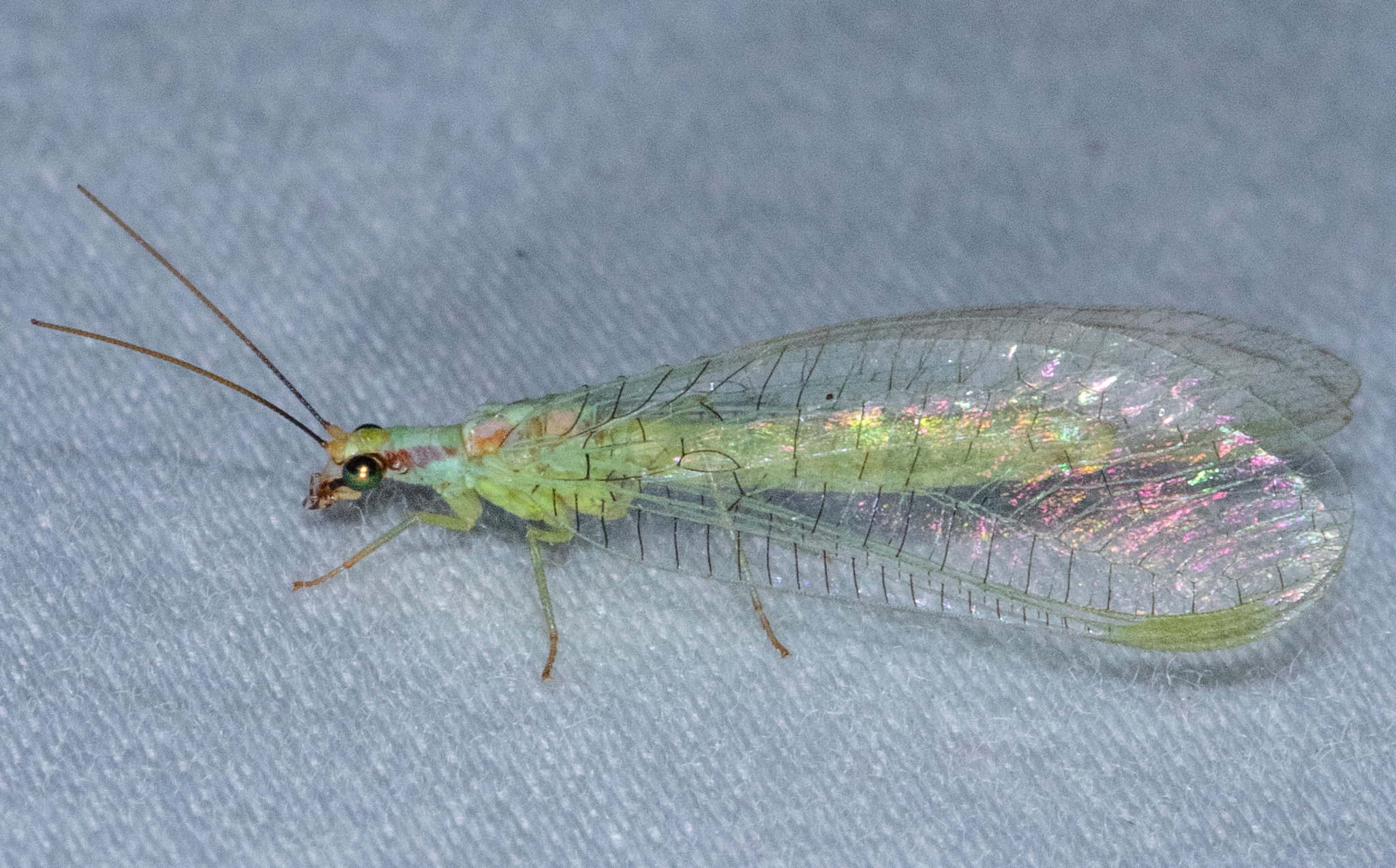

Scientific classification
- Domain: Eukaryota
- Kingdom: Animalia
- Phylum: Arthropoda
- Class: Insecta
- Order: Neuroptera
- Family: Chrysopidae
- Tribe: Chrysopini
- Genus: Chrysopa
- Species: C. coloradensis

Binomial name
- Chrysopa coloradensis Banks, 1895

= Chrysopa coloradensis =

Species of lacewing

Chrysopa coloradensis is a species of green lacewing in the family Chrysopidae. It can be found in North America.
