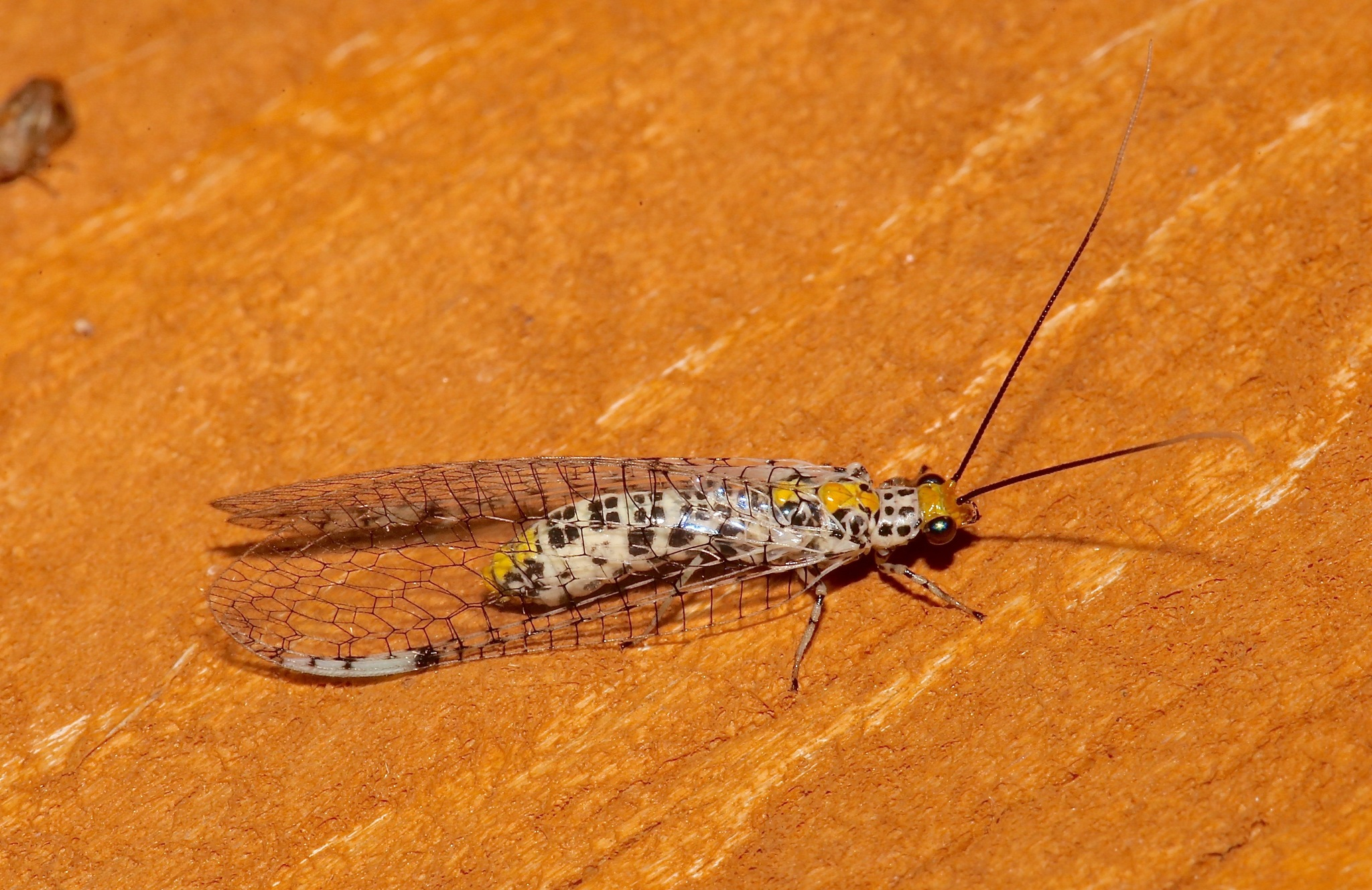
- Abachrysa eureka from Florida

Scientific classification
- Domain: Eukaryota
- Kingdom: Animalia
- Phylum: Arthropoda
- Class: Insecta
- Order: Neuroptera
- Family: Chrysopidae
- Subfamily: Chrysopinae
- Tribe: Belonopterygini
- Genus: Abachrysa; Banks, 1938
- Species: A. eureka

Binomial name
- Abachrysa eureka (Banks, 1931)

= Abachrysa =

Genus of lacewings

Abachrysa is a genus of green lacewings in the family Chrysopidae. There is one described species in Abachrysa, Abachrysa eureka.
