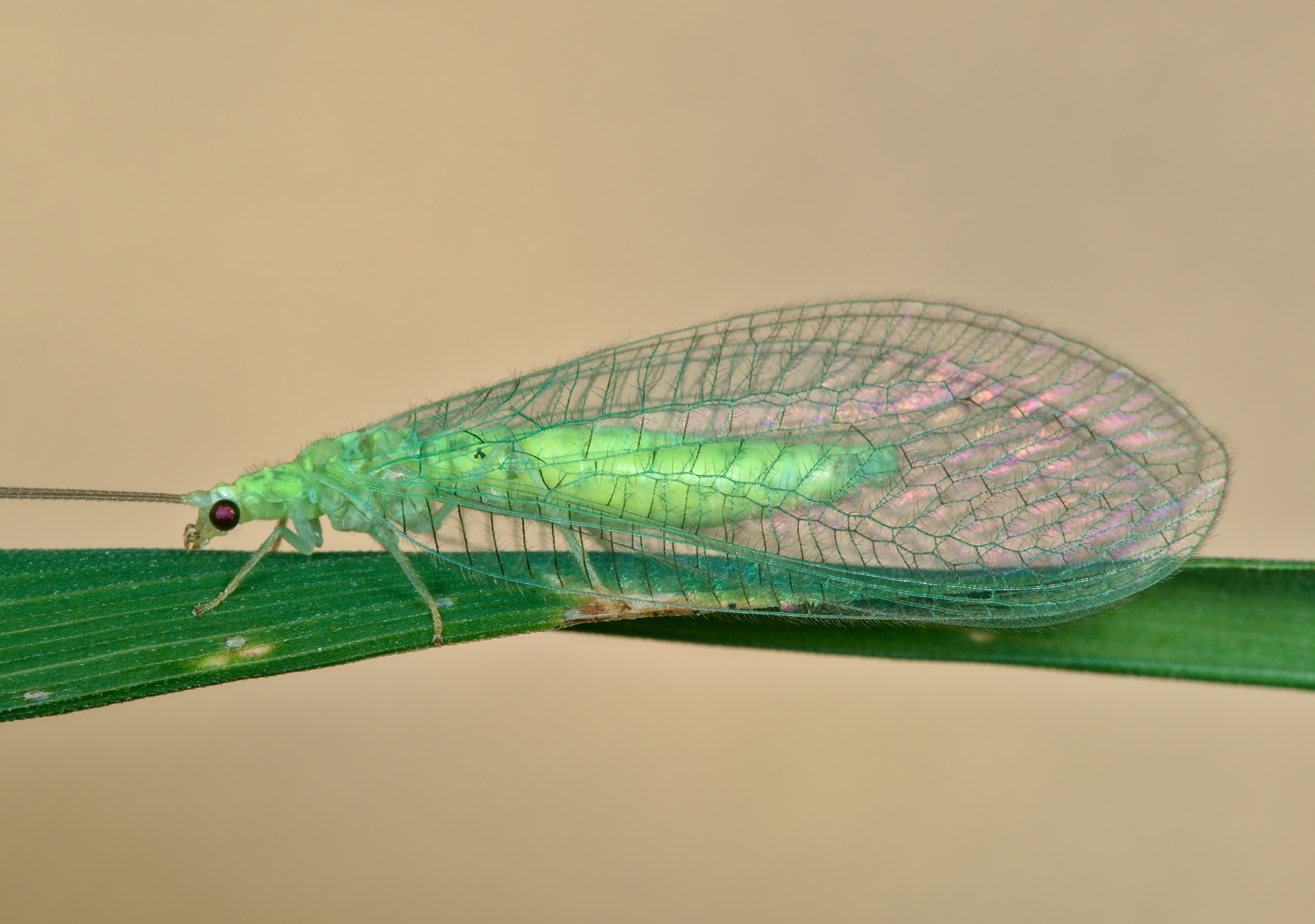
- Chrysopidia ciliata

Scientific classification
- Kingdom: Animalia
- Phylum: Arthropoda
- Class: Insecta
- Order: Neuroptera
- Family: Chrysopidae
- Subfamily: Chrysopinae
- Tribe: Chrysopini
- Genus: Chrysopidia; Navás, 1911

Species
- See text

= Chrysopidia =

Genus of lacewings

Chrysopidia is a green lacewing genus in the subfamily Chrysopinae.

== Species ==
- Chrysopidia ciliata
- Chrysopidia elegans
- Chrysopidia erato
- Chrysopidia flavilineata
- Chrysopidia fuscata
- Chrysopidia garhwalensis
- Chrysopidia holzeli
- Chrysopidia ignobilis
- Chrysopidia jiriana
- Chrysopidia jocasta
- Chrysopidia junbesiana
- Chrysopidia manipurensis
- Chrysopidia nigrata
- Chrysopidia numerosa
- Chrysopidia obliquata
- Chrysopidia orientalis
- Chrysopidia regulata
- Chrysopidia remanei
- Chrysopidia shennongana
- Chrysopidia sinica
- Chrysopidia trigonia
- Chrysopidia xiangana
- Chrysopidia yangi
- Chrysopidia zhaoi
