= Suarius =

Scientific classification
- Kingdom: Animalia
- Phylum: Arthropoda
- Class: Insecta
- Order: Neuroptera
- Family: Chrysopidae
- Subfamily: Chrysopinae
- Tribe: Chrysopini
- Genus: Suarius; Navas, 1914

Genus of lacewings

External image
- Images at iNaturalist

Suarius is a genus of Palaearctic and Oriental realm lacewings in the tribe Chrysopini, erected by Longinos Navás in 1914.

== Species ==
The Global Biodiversity Information Facility includes:

1. Suarius afghanus (Hölzel, 1967)
2. Suarius alisteri (Navás, 1914)
3. Suarius caviceps (McLachlan, 1898)
4. Suarius celsus C.-k.Yang et al., 1999
5. Suarius fedtschenkoi (McLachlan, 1875)
6. Suarius gobiensis (Tjeder, 1936)
7. Suarius hainanus X.-k.Yang & C.-k.Yang, 1991
8. Suarius hamulatus X.-k.Yang & C.-k.Yang, 1991
9. Suarius helanus (X.-k.Yang, 1993)
10. Suarius huashanensis C.-k.Yang & X.-k.Yang, 1989
11. Suarius iberiensis Hölzel, 1974
12. Suarius iranensis Hölzel, 1974
13. Suarius maroccanus Hölzel, 1965
14. Suarius mongolicus (Tjeder, 1936)
15. Suarius nanchanicus (Navás, 1927)
16. Suarius nanus (McLachlan, 1893)
17. Suarius paghmanus (Hölzel, 1967)
18. Suarius pallidus Hölzel, 1978
19. Suarius posticus (Navás, 1936)
20. Suarius pygmaeus (Navás, 1930)
21. Suarius ressli Hölzel, 1974
22. Suarius sphenochilus X.-k.Yang & C.-k.Yang, 1991
23. Suarius storeyi (Navás, 1926)
24. Suarius tigridis (Morton, 1921)
25. Suarius trilineatus X.-k.Yang, 1991
26. Suarius vanensis (Hölzel, 1967)
27. Suarius vartianae (Hölzel, 1967)
28. Suarius walsinghami Navás, 1914
29. Suarius yasumatsui (Kuwayama, 1962)
