= Chrysopidia elegans =

Scientific classification
- Domain: Eukaryota
- Kingdom: Animalia
- Phylum: Arthropoda
- Class: Insecta
- Order: Neuroptera
- Family: Chrysopidae
- Genus: Chrysopidia
- Species: C. elegans

Binomial name
- Chrysopidia elegans Hölzel, 1973

Species of lacewing

Chrysopidia elegans is a green lacewing species in the genus Chrysopidia found in China and Nepal.
