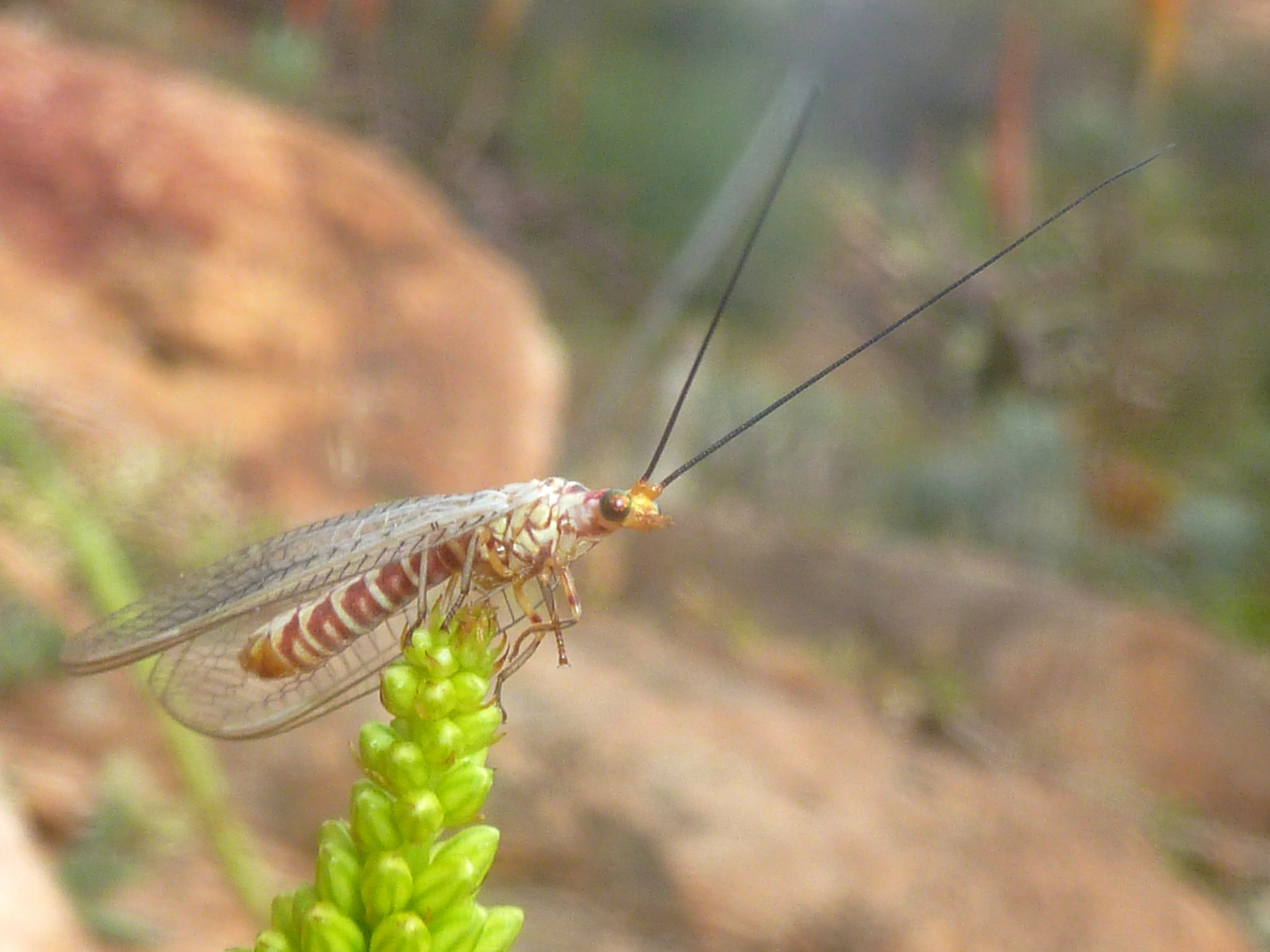
- Dysochrysa furcata

Scientific classification
- Domain: Eukaryota
- Kingdom: Animalia
- Phylum: Arthropoda
- Class: Insecta
- Order: Neuroptera
- Family: Chrysopidae
- Subfamily: Chrysopinae
- Tribe: Belonopterygini
- Genus: Dysochrysa; Tjeder, 1966

= Dysochrysa =

Genus of lacewings

Dysochrysa, the red lacewings, belong to the green lacewing family Chrysopidae. They are medium-sized Afrotropical lacewings with large eyes, and have brightly coloured bodies like the related genus Oviedus.

== Species ==
The small genus contains at least two species, including:

- Dysochrysa furcata
- Dysochrysa reflexa
