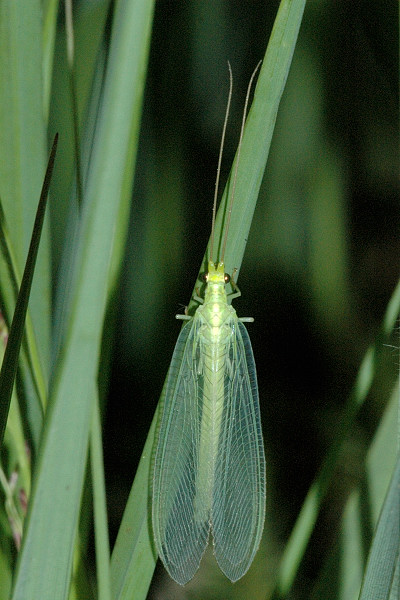
- Nineta

Scientific classification
- Domain: Eukaryota
- Kingdom: Animalia
- Phylum: Arthropoda
- Class: Insecta
- Order: Neuroptera
- Family: Chrysopidae
- Tribe: Chrysopini
- Genus: Nineta; Navás, 1912

= Nineta =

Genus of insects

Nineta is a genus of lacewings belonging to the tribe Chrysopini, erected by Longinos Navás in 1912.

The species of this genus are found in Europe through to eastern Asia and Northern America.

== Species ==
The Global Biodiversity Information Facility includes:

1. Nineta abunda C.-k.Yang & X.-k.Yang, 1989
2. Nineta afghanica Hölzel, 1982
3. Nineta alpicola (Kuwayama, 1956)
4. Nineta carinthiaca (Hölzel, 1965)
5. Nineta dolichoptera (Navás, 1910)
6. Nineta flava (Scopoli, 1763)
7. Nineta gevnensis Canbulat & Kiyak, 2003
8. Nineta grandis Navás, 1915
9. Nineta gravida (Banks, 1911)
10. Nineta guadarramensis (Pictet, 1865)
11. Nineta inpunctata (Reuter, 1894)
12. Nineta itoi Tsukaguchi, 1995
13. Nineta nanina (Banks, 1911)
14. Nineta pallida (Schneider, 1846)
15. Nineta pomacea Zakharenko, 1983
16. Nineta principiae Monserrat, 1981
17. Nineta shaanxiensis C.-k.Yang & X.-k.Yang, 1989
18. Nineta vittata (Wesmael, 1841)
