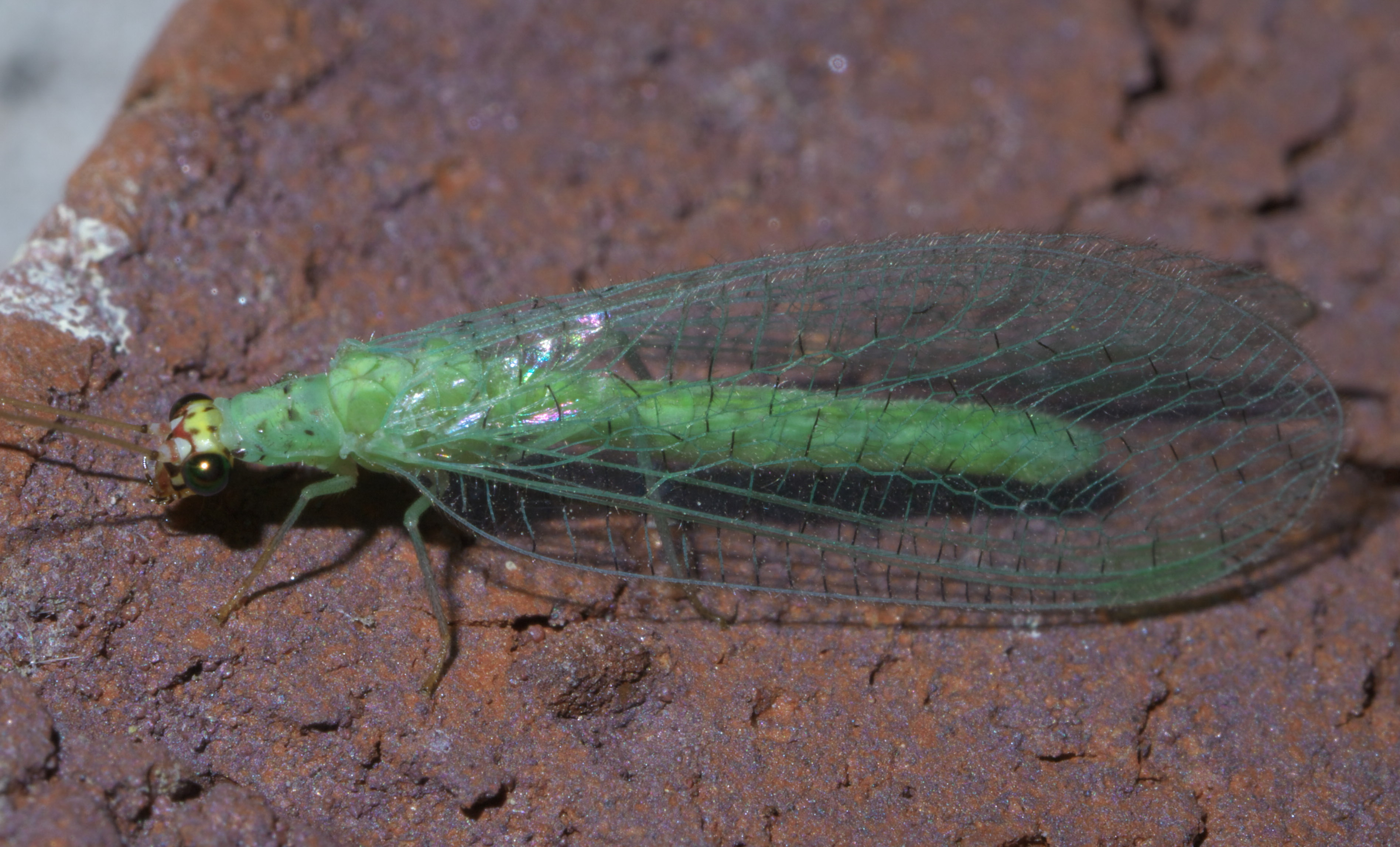
- Chrysopa oculata

Scientific classification
- Kingdom: Animalia
- Phylum: Arthropoda
- Class: Insecta
- Order: Neuroptera
- Family: Chrysopidae
- Subfamily: Chrysopinae
- Tribe: Chrysopini; Schneider, 1851

= Chrysopini =

Tribe of lacewings

Chrysopini is a tribe of green lacewings in the family Chrysopidae. There are about 32 genera and 926 described species in Chrysopini.

== Genera ==
- Anomalochrysa McLachlan, 1883 — 19 species
- Apertochrysa Tjeder, 1966 — 183 species
- Atlantochrysa Hölzel, 1970 — 1 species
- Austrochrysa Esben-Petersen, 1928 — 9 species
- Borniochrysa Brooks & Barnard, 1990 — 5 species
- Brinckochrysa Tjeder, 1966 — 23 species
- Ceraeochrysa Adams, 1982 — 62 species
- Ceratochrysa Tjeder, 1966 — 3 species
- Chrysemosa Brooks & Barnard, 1990 — 11 species
- Chrysocerca Weele, 1909 — 6 species
- Chrysopa Leach in Brewster, 1815 — over 60 sensu stricto, 199 species including incertae sedis
- Chrysoperla Steinmann, 1964 — 67 species
- Chrysopidia Navás, 1911 — 19 species
- Chrysopodes Navás, 1913 — 47 species
- Cunctochrysa Hölzel, 1970 — 10 species
- Eremochrysa Banks, 1903 — 18 species
- Furcochrysa Freitas & Penny - 1 species
- Glenochrysa Esben-Petersen, 1920 — 16 species
- Himalochrysa Hölzel, 1973 — 3 species
- Kostka - monotypic Kostka nacaratus Navás, 1913 from peninsular Malaysia
- Kymachyrsa Tauber & Garland, 2014 — 2 species
- Mallada Navás, 1925 — 61 species
- Meleoma Fitch, 1855 — 28 species
- Nineta Navás, 1912 — 18 species
- Parachrysopiella Brooks & Barnard, 1990 — 3 species
- Peyerimhoffina Lacroix, 1920 — 1 species
- Plesiochrysa Adams, 1982 — 29 species
- Rexa Navás, 1920 — 2 species
- Suarius Navás, 1914 — 29 species
- Titanochrysa Sosa and Freitas, 2012 — 6 species
- Tumeochrysa Needham, 1909 — 14 species
- Ungla Navás, 1914 — 26 species
- Yumachrysa Banks, 1950 — 4 species

== Gallery ==
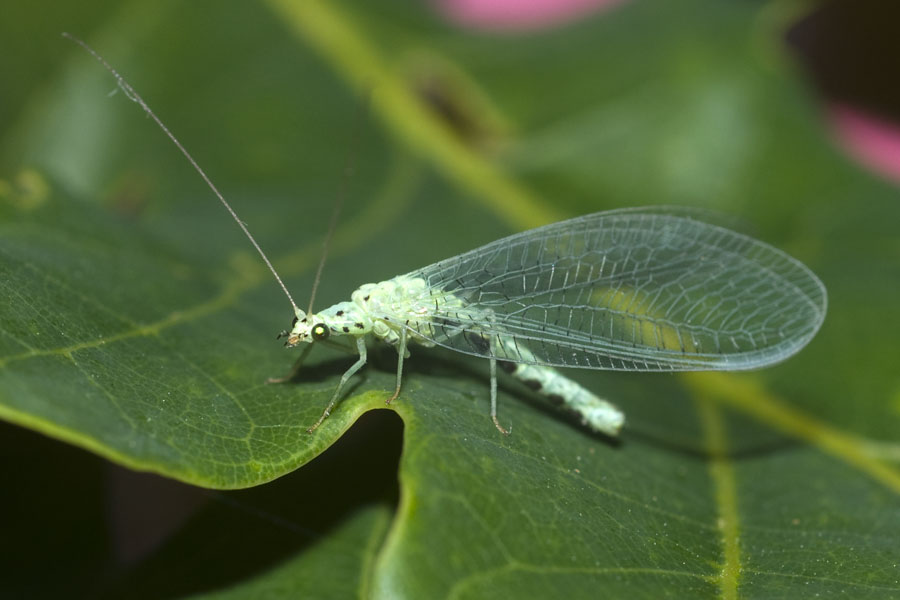
Apertochrysa ventralis

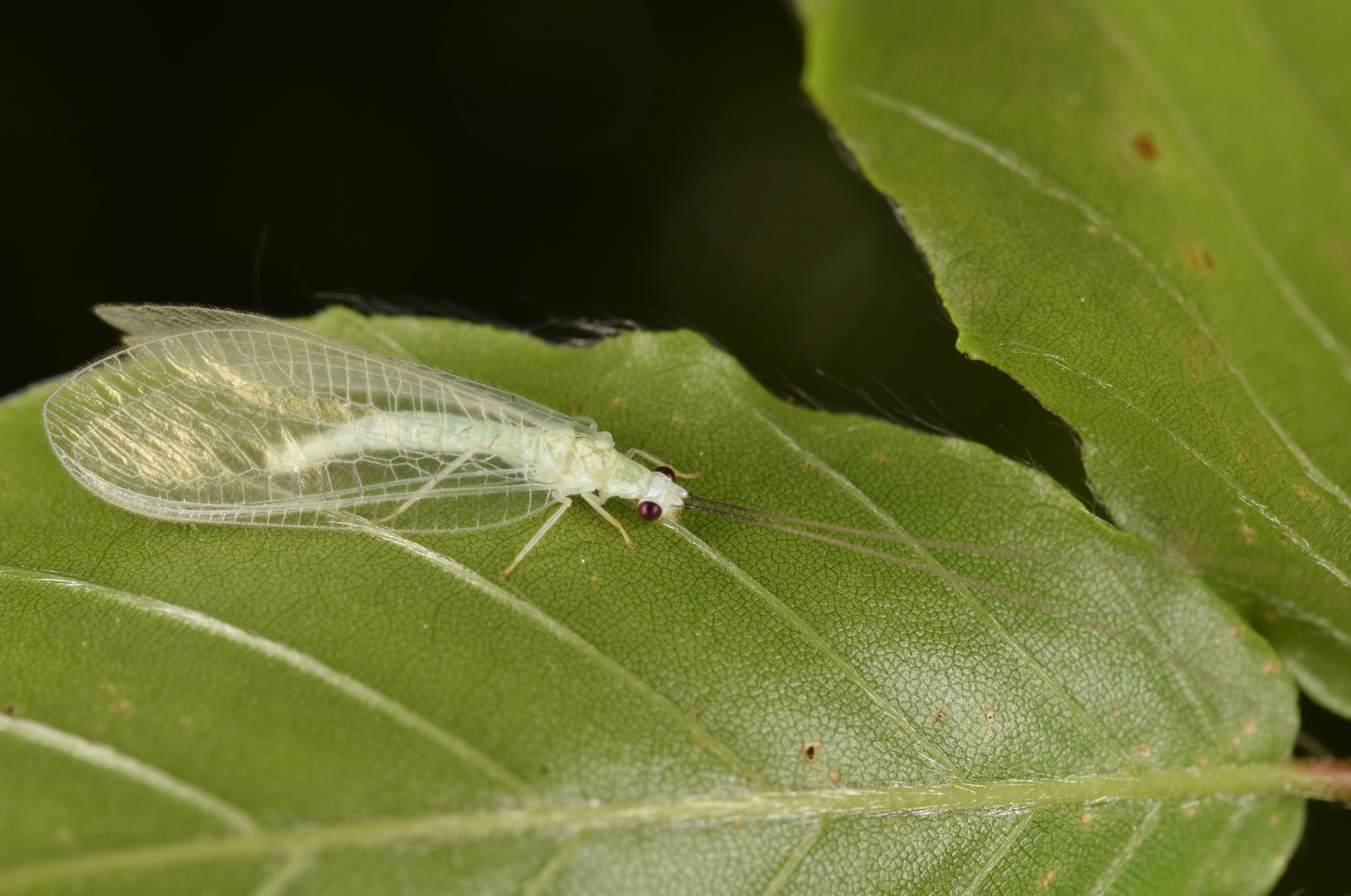
Ceraeochrysa lineaticornis

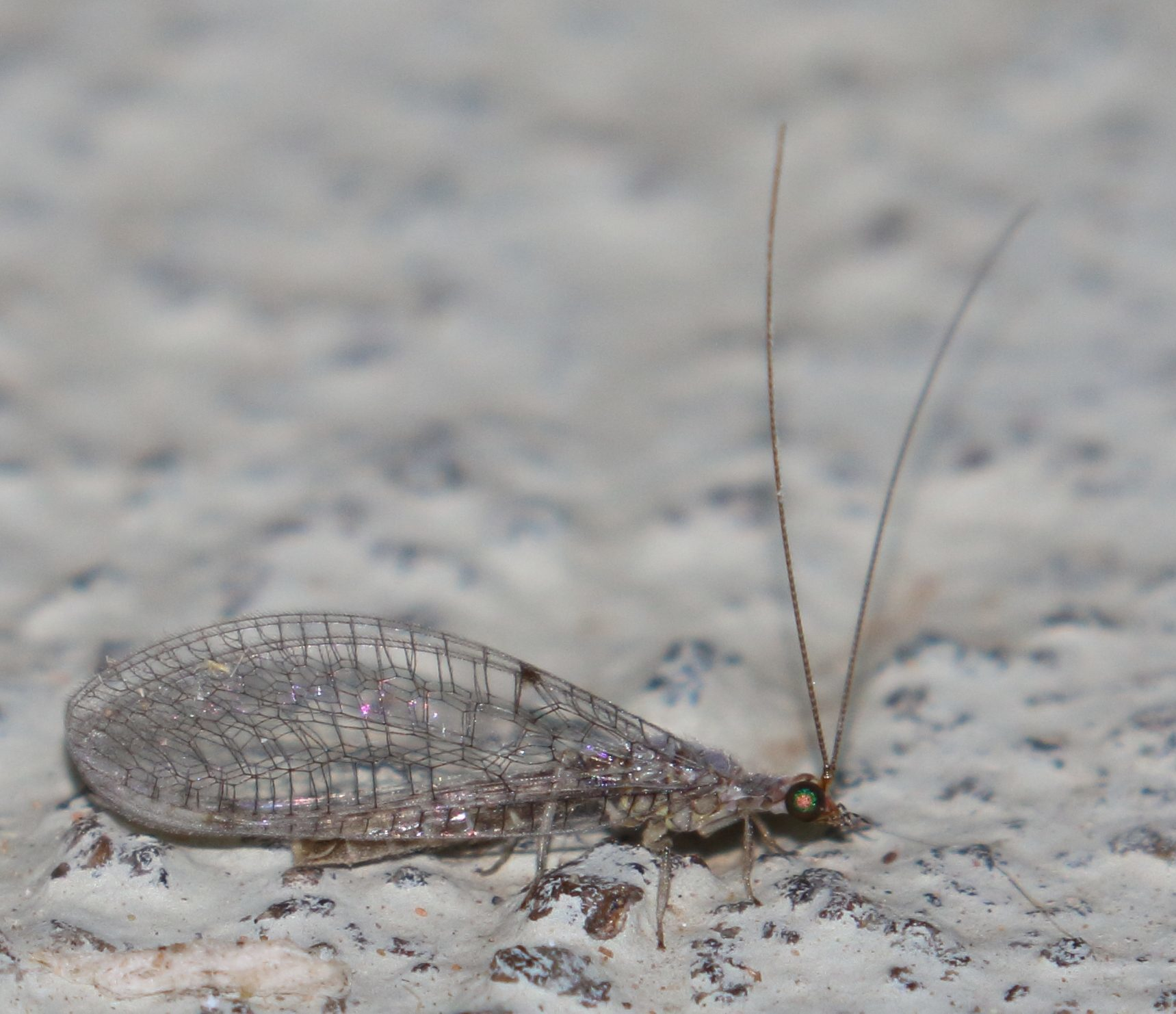
Chrysemosa jeanneli

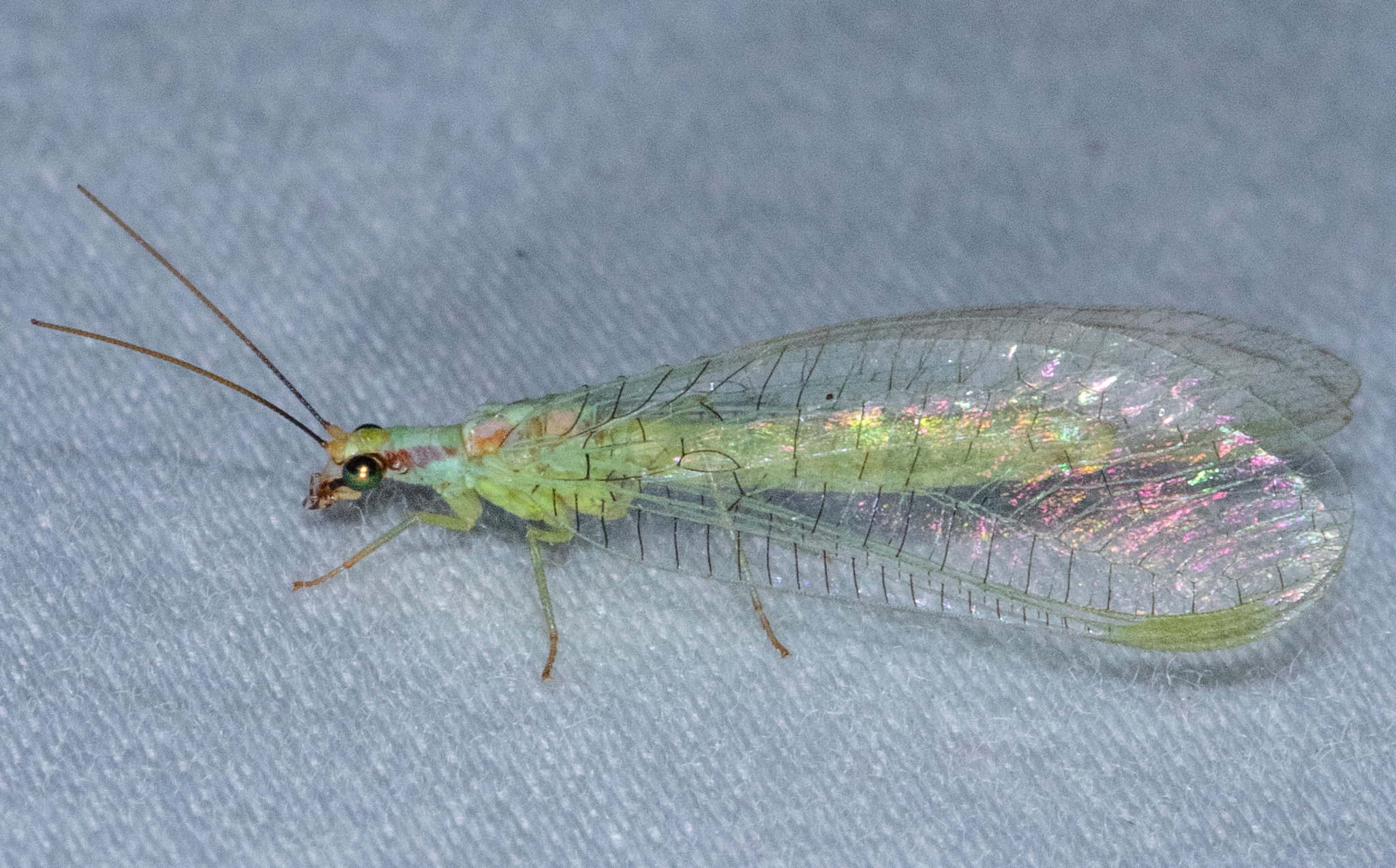
Chrysopa coloradensis

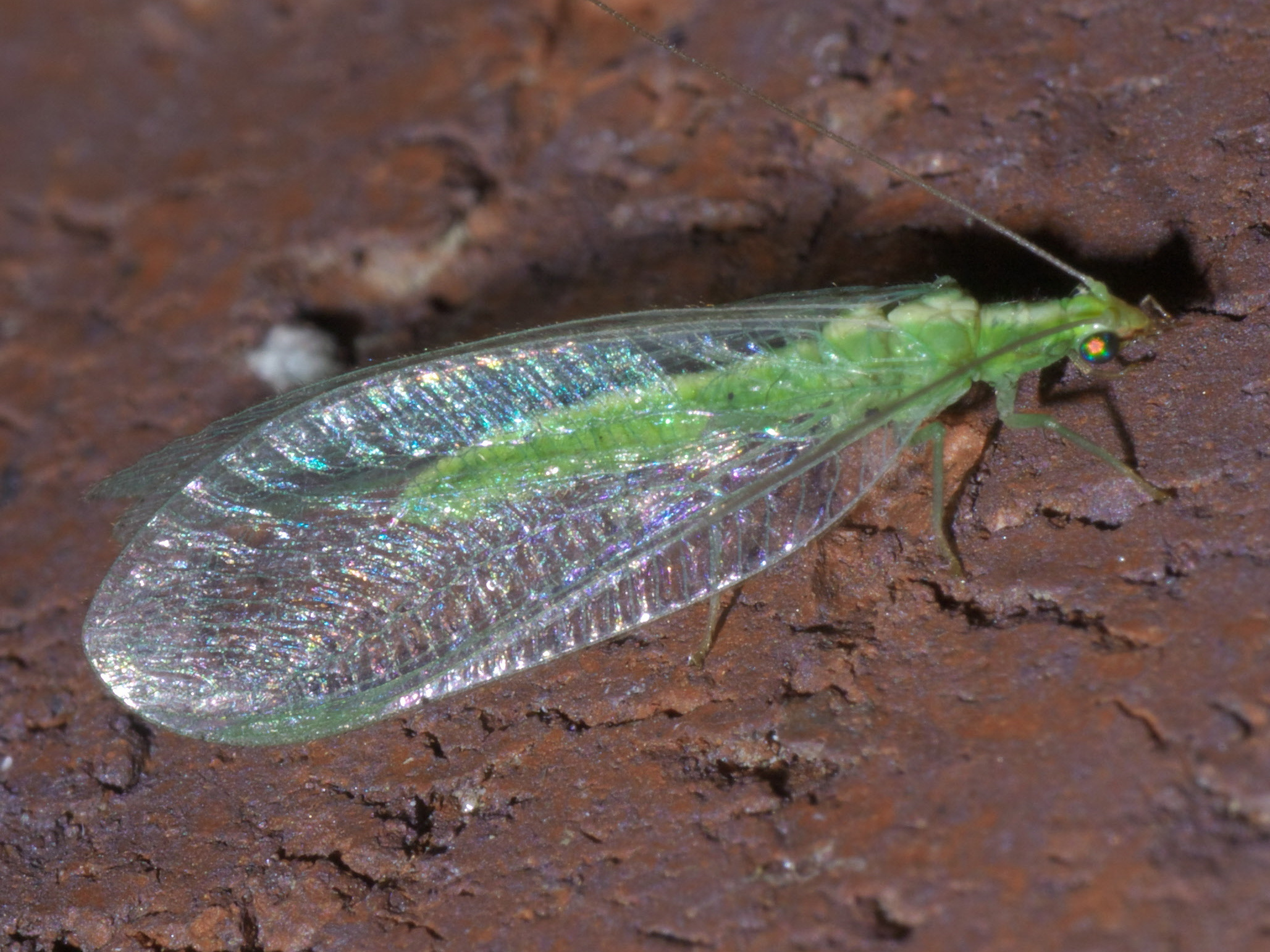
Chrysoperla rufilabris

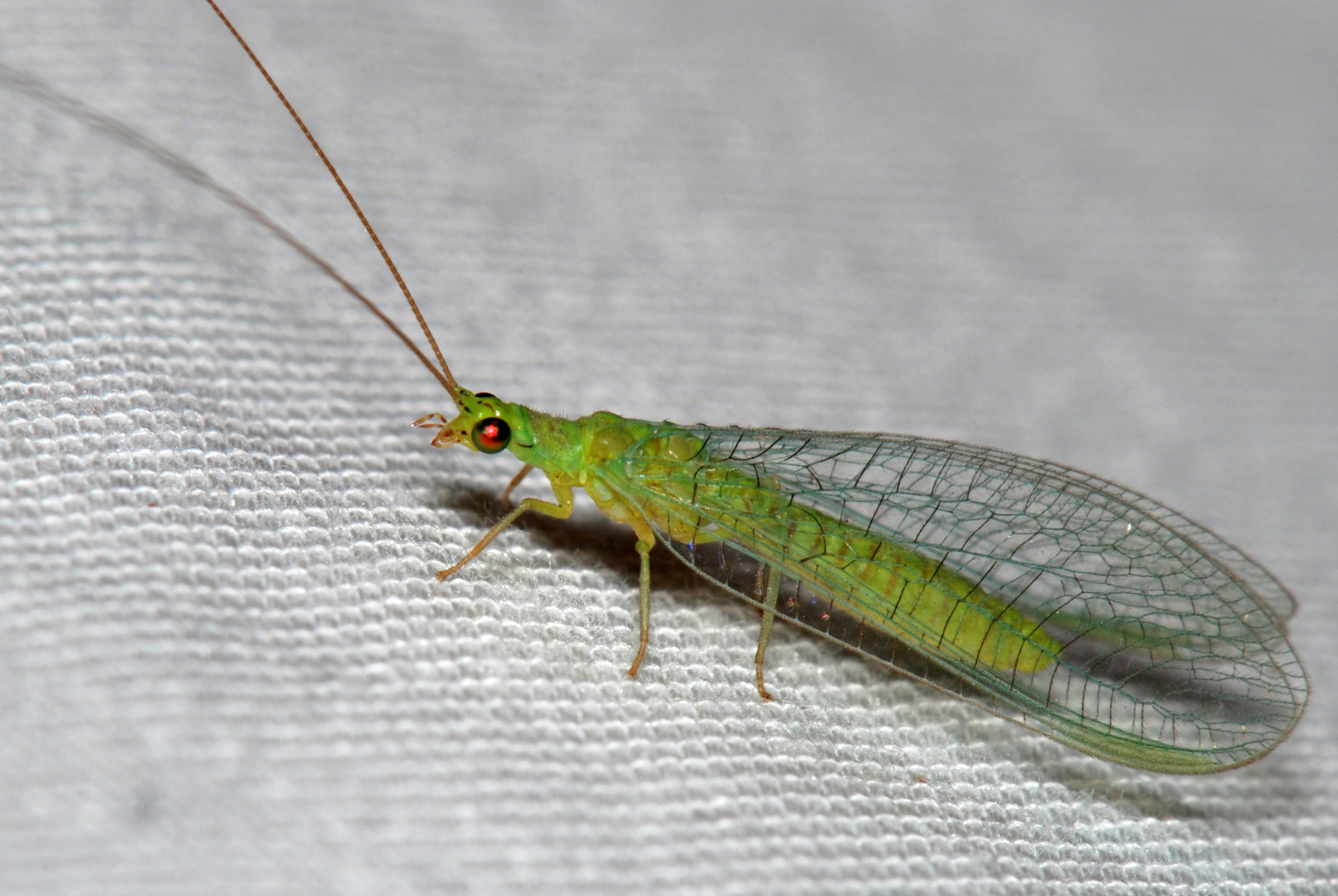
Mallada signatus

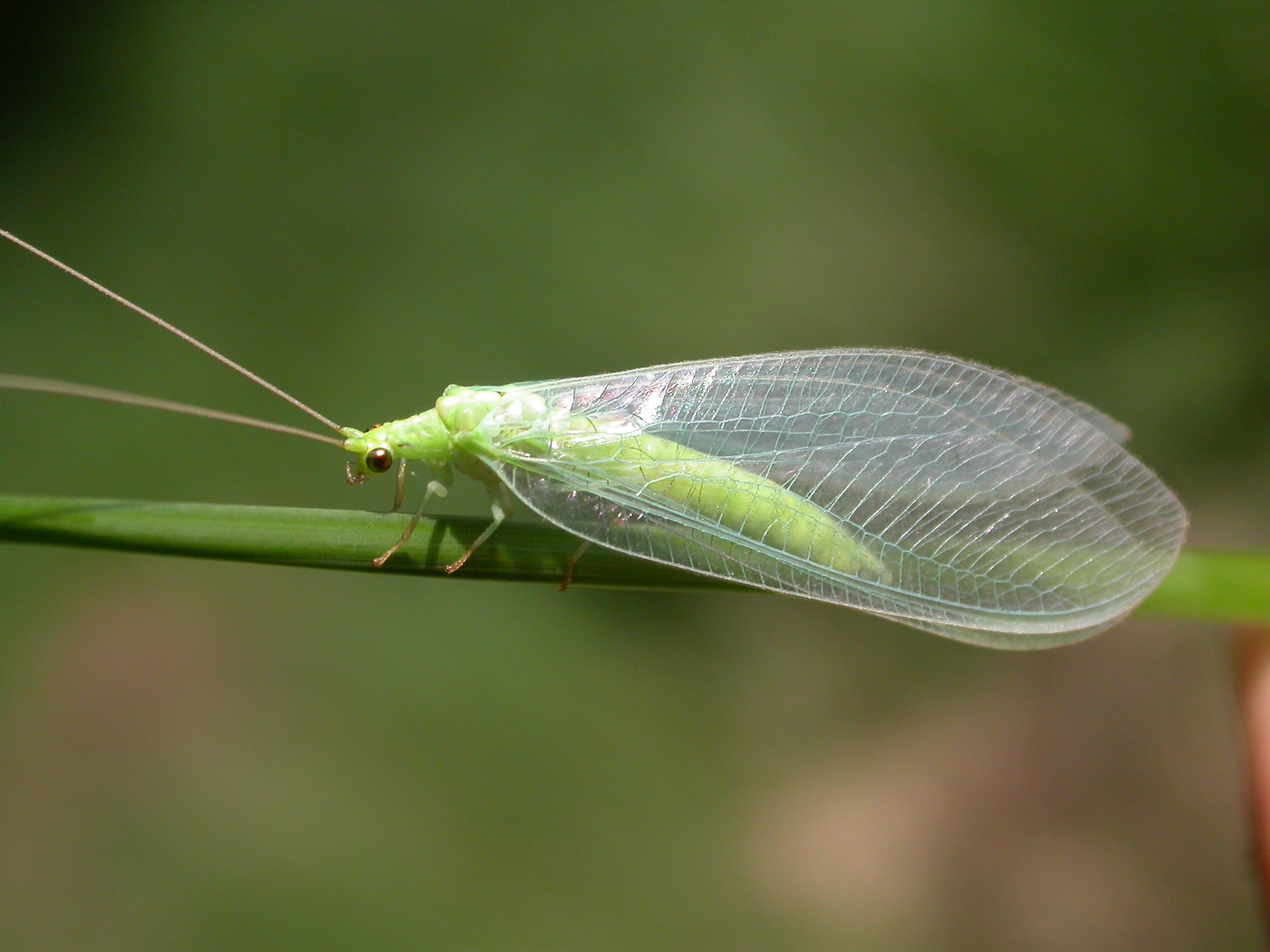
Nineta vittata

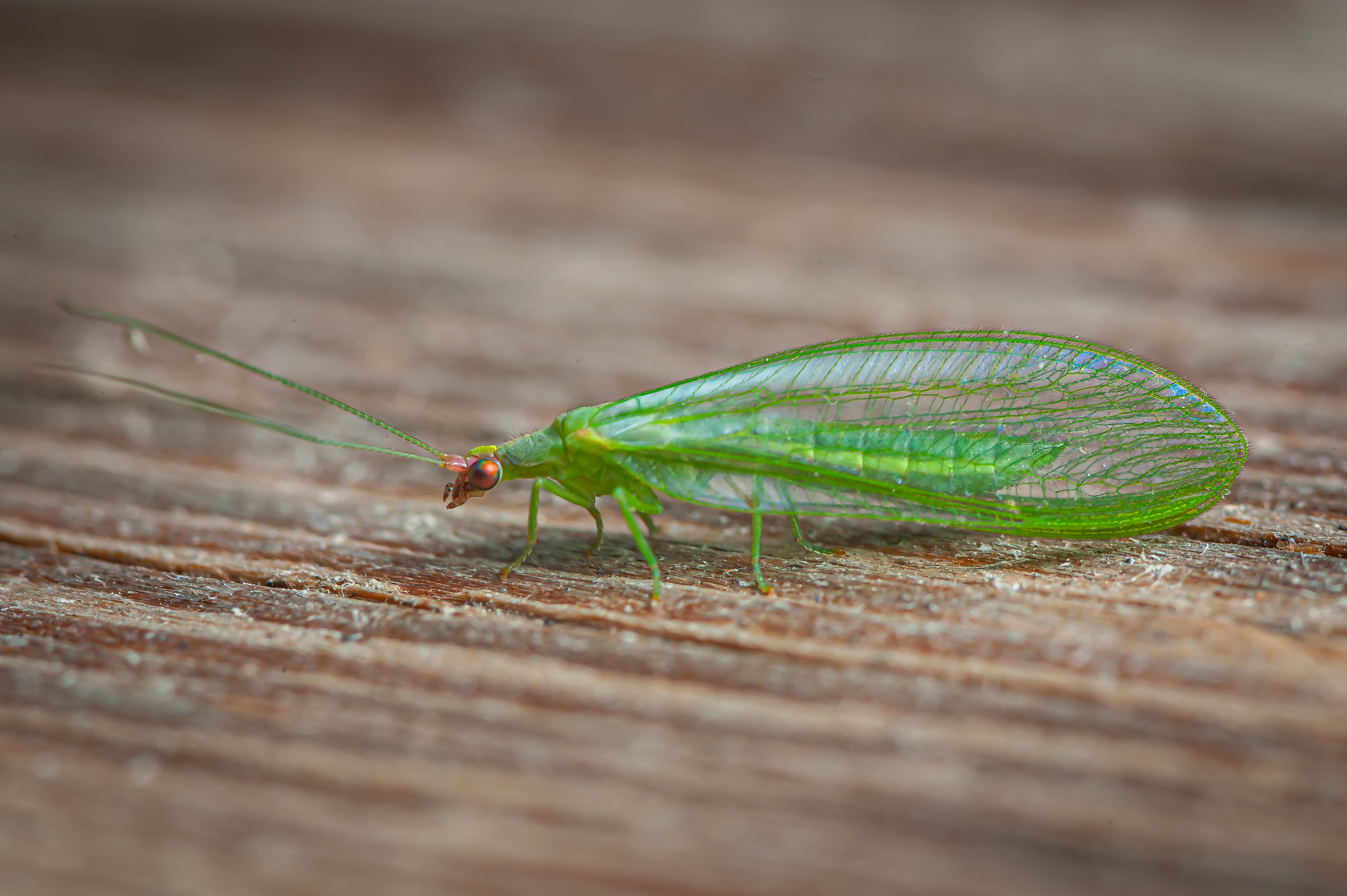
Peyerimhoffina gracilis
