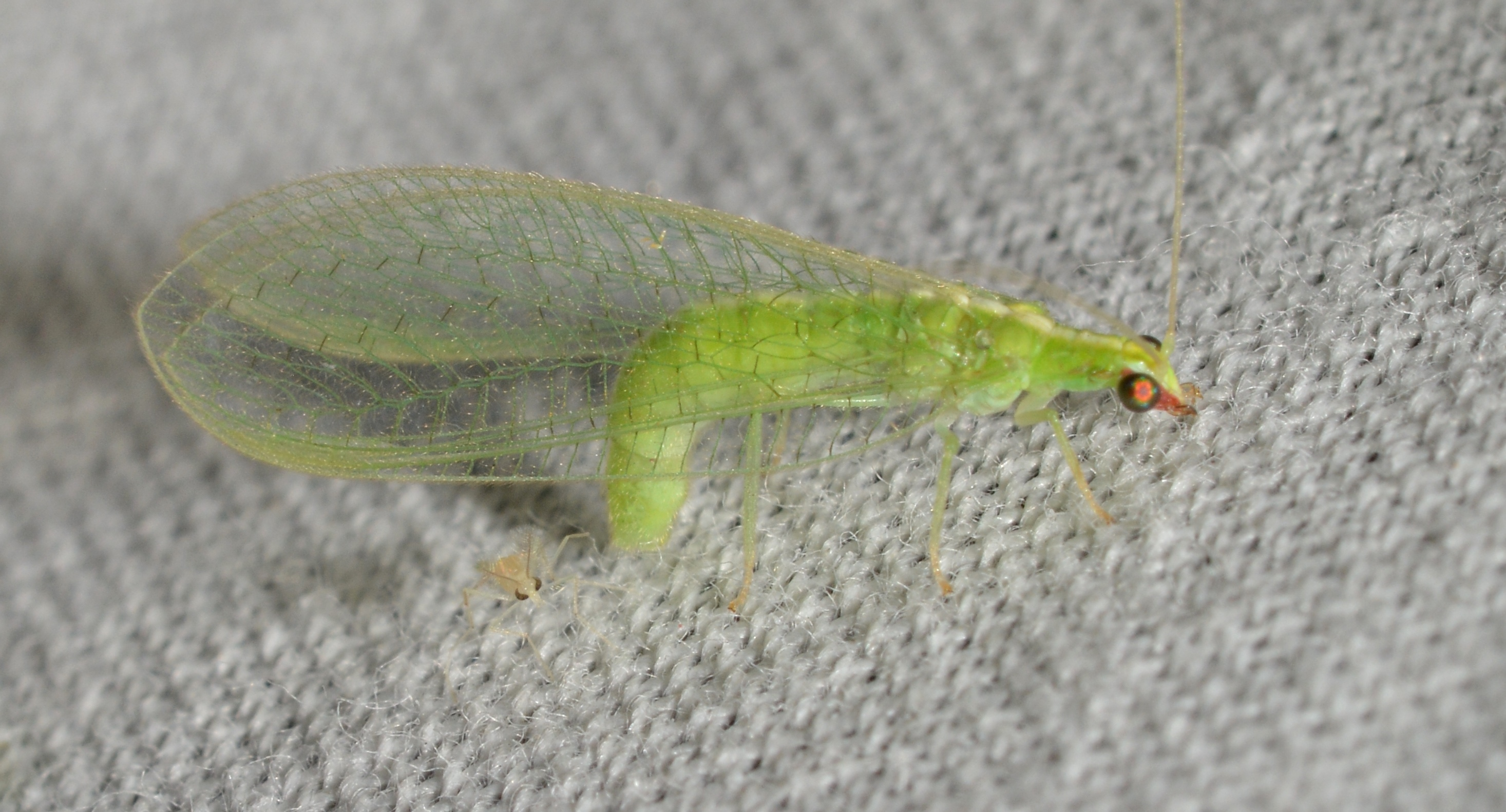

Scientific classification
- Kingdom: Animalia
- Phylum: Arthropoda
- Class: Insecta
- Order: Neuroptera
- Family: Chrysopidae
- Tribe: Chrysopini
- Genus: Chrysoperla
- Species: C. rufilabris

Binomial name
- Chrysoperla rufilabris (Burmeister, 1839)

Synonyms
- Chrysopa rufilabris Burmeister, 1839; Chrysopa interrupta Schneider, 1851; Chrysopa attenuata Walker, 1853; Chrysopa repleta Walker, 1853; Chrysopa novaeboracensis Fitch, 1855; Chrysopa tabida Fitch, 1855; Chrysopa citri Ashmead, 1880; Chrysopa medialis Banks, 1903; Leucochrysa citri (Ashmead, 1880); Chrysoperla tabida (Fitch, 1855

= Chrysoperla rufilabris =

Species of lacewing

Chrysoperla rufilabris, also known as the red-lipped green lacewing, is a species of green lacewing in the family Chrysopidae.

== Distribution ==
This species is native to the eastern portion of North America.

== Description ==
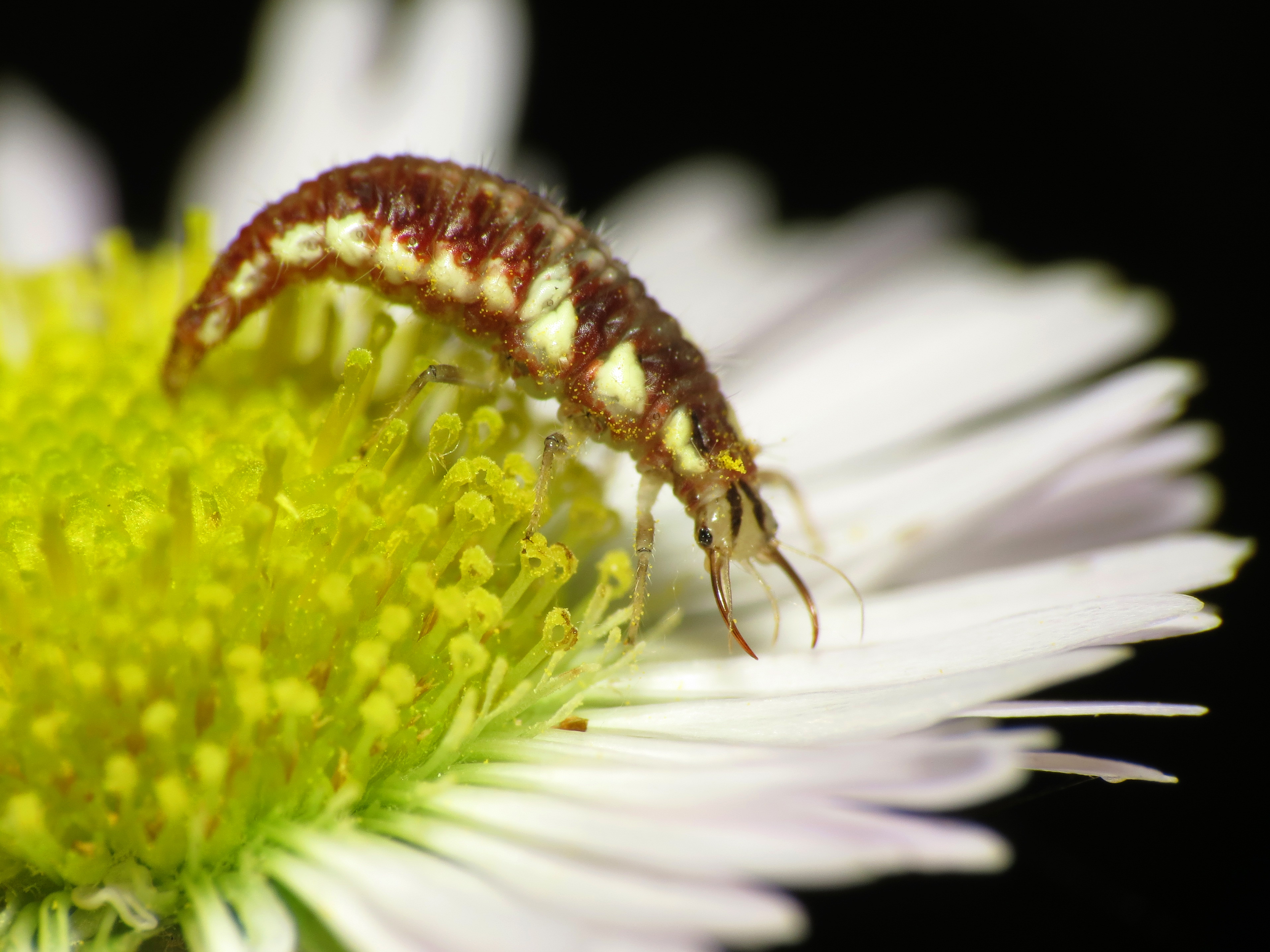
Red-lipped Green Lacewing (Chrysoperla rufilabris) larva

C. rufilabris are distinguished from other members of the genus found in North America by the broadly red genae, pointed apex of the fore wing, black gradate crossveins, and spinellae on the male genitalia.

== Biology ==
The larvae of this species prey upon soft-bodied insects including aphids, thrips, and whiteflies.
