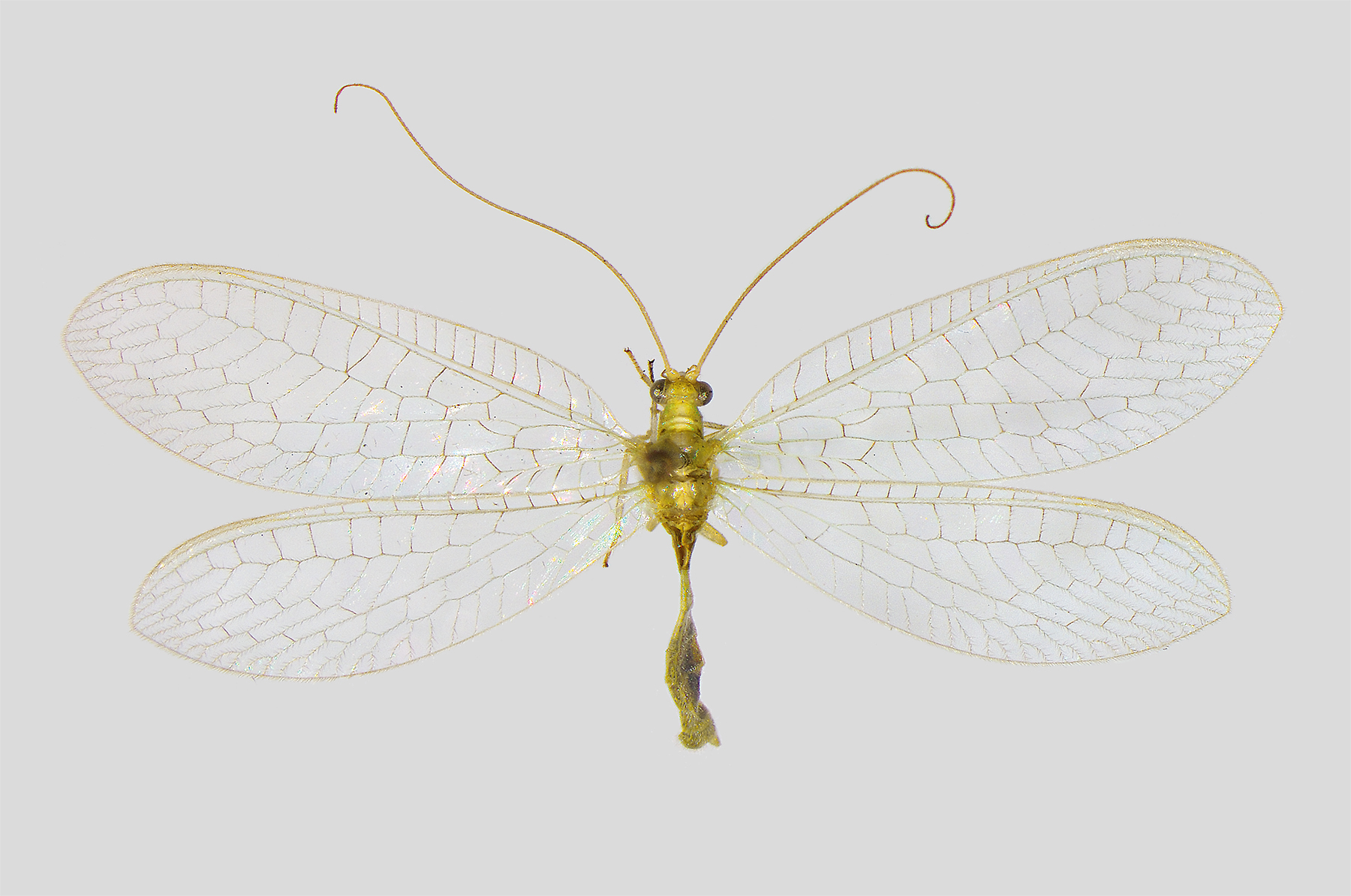
- Cunctochrysa albolineata, c.2011

Scientific classification
- Domain: Eukaryota
- Kingdom: Animalia
- Phylum: Arthropoda
- Class: Insecta
- Order: Neuroptera
- Family: Chrysopidae
- Tribe: Chrysopini
- Genus: Cunctochrysa; Hölzel, 1970

= Cunctochrysa =

Genus of insects

Cunctochrysa is a genus of insects belonging to the family Chrysopidae.

The species of this genus are found in Europe, Southern Africa and central Asia through to Japan.

== Species ==
The Global Biodiversity Information Facility includes:

1. Cunctochrysa albolineata (Killington, 1935)
2. Cunctochrysa albolineatoides (Tsukaguchi, 1995)
3. Cunctochrysa baetica (Hölzel, 1972)
4. Cunctochrysa cosmia (Navás, 1918)
5. Cunctochrysa jubingensis (Hölzel, 1973)
6. Cunctochrysa kannemeyeri (Esben-Petersen, 1920)
7. Cunctochrysa opipara (Hölzel, 1973)
8. Cunctochrysa shuenica C.-k.Yang et al., 1992
9. Cunctochrysa sinica C.-k.Yang & X.-k.Yang, 1989
10. Cunctochrysa yulongshana C.-k.Yang et al., 1992
