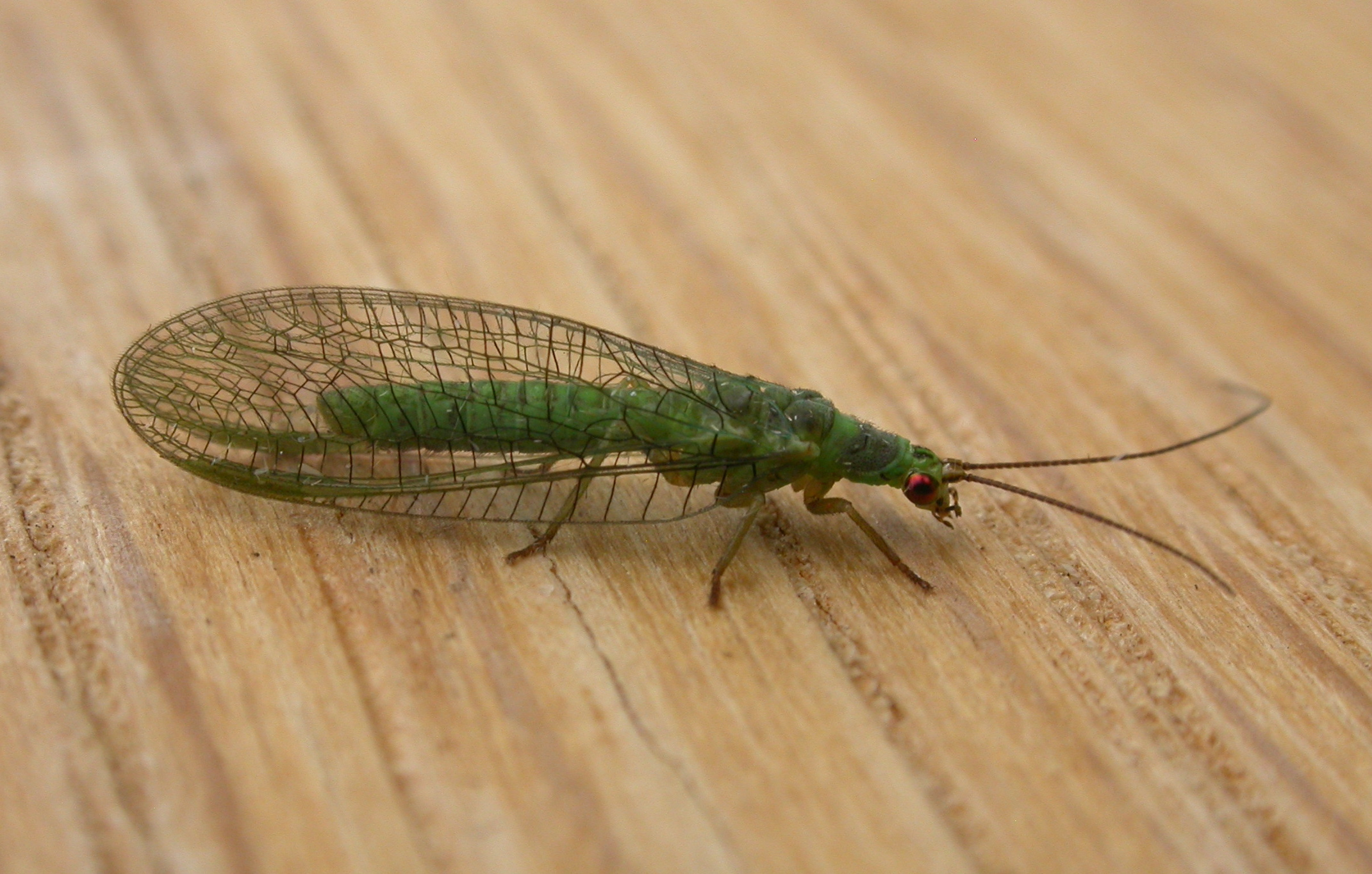
- Mallada signatus

Scientific classification
- Domain: Eukaryota
- Kingdom: Animalia
- Phylum: Arthropoda
- Class: Insecta
- Order: Neuroptera
- Family: Chrysopidae
- Genus: Mallada
- Species: M. signatus

Binomial name
- Mallada signatus Schneider, 1851

Synonyms
- Mallada alcatoa, Banks, 1943 Chrysopa alcatoa, Banks, 1943 Mallada signata, Schneider, 1851

= Mallada signatus =

Species of lacewing insect

Mallada signatus, commonly known as the green lacewing is a species of insect described by Wilhelm Gottlieb Schneider in 1851.

It is one of the species most commonly found in southern Australia.

They closely resemble Plesiochyrsa ramburi, however, the late instar larva and adults of Mallada signatus are smaller, with minimal dark markings on the head of the adults.

They can be negatively affected by feeding on prey which has been in contact with neem oil.
