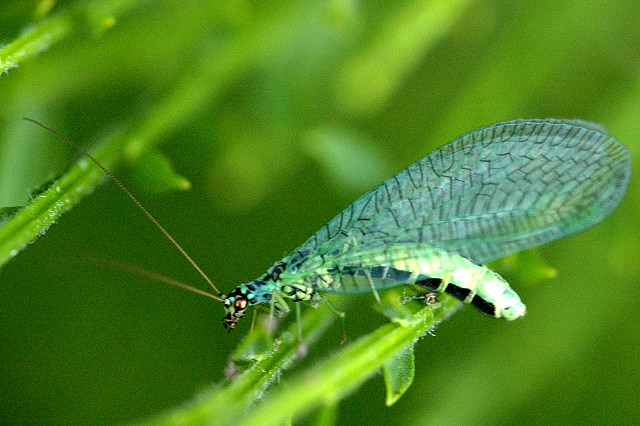
- Chrysopa perla (Chrysopini)

Scientific classification
- Kingdom: Animalia
- Phylum: Arthropoda
- Clade: Pancrustacea
- Class: Insecta
- Order: Neuroptera
- Superfamily: Chrysopoidea
- Family: Chrysopidae; Esben-Petersen, 1918

Diversity
- About 85 genera

= Chrysopidae =

Family of insects

Green lacewings are insects in the large family Chrysopidae of the order Neuroptera.

There are about 85 genera and (differing between sources) 1,300–2,000 species in this widespread group. Members of the genera Chrysopa and Chrysoperla are very common in North America and Europe; they are very similar and many of their species have been moved from one genus to the other time and again, and in the nonscientific literature assignment to Chrysopa and Chrysoperla can rarely be relied upon. Since they are the most familiar neuropterans to many people, they are often simply called "lacewings"

== Description and ecology ==
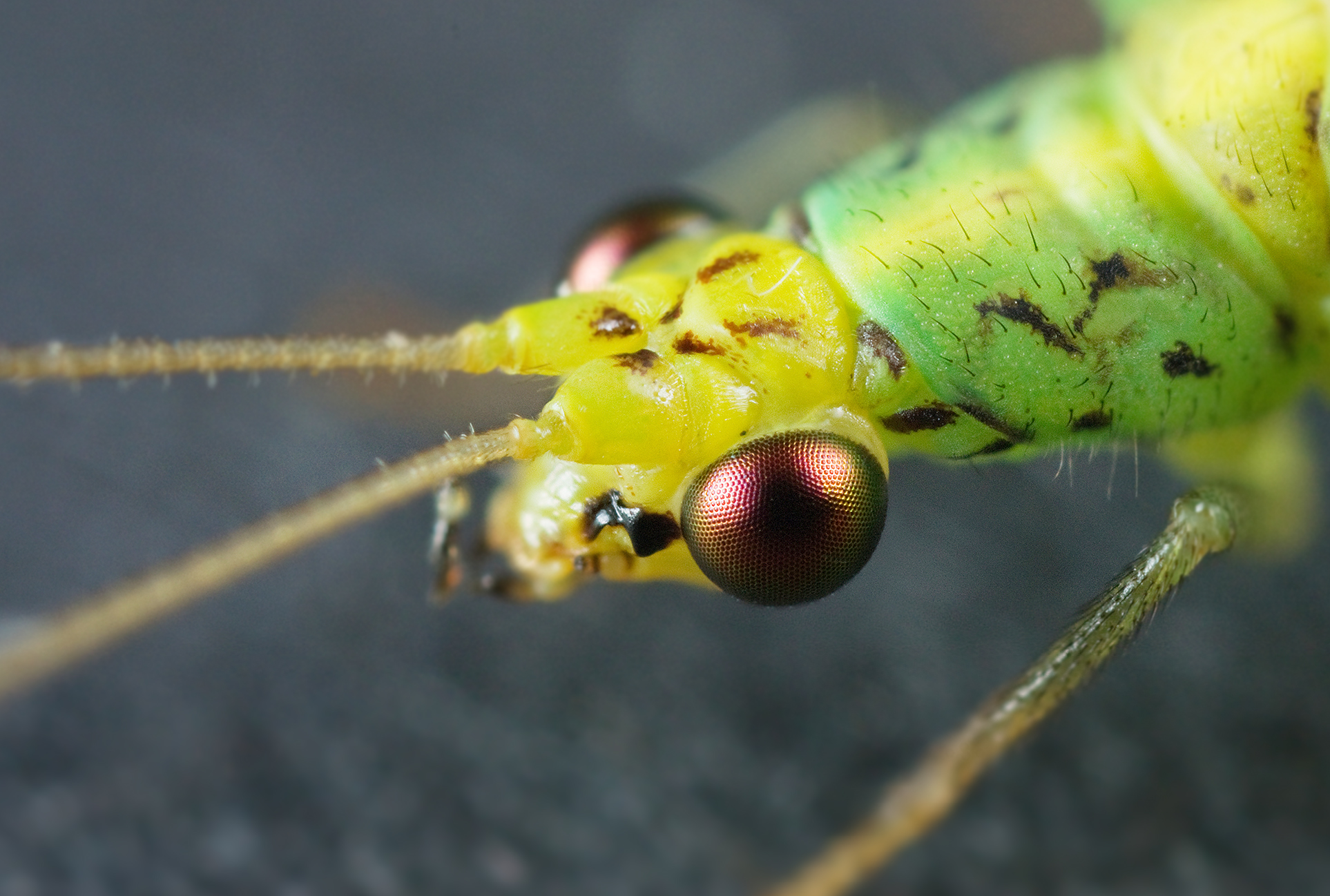
Head close-up of Apertochrysa edwardsi from Austins Ferry, Tasmania, Australia

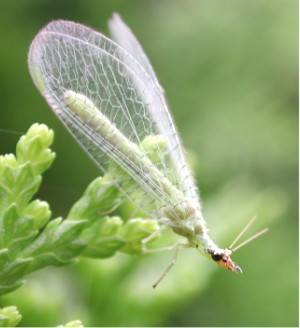
Imago perched on greenery

Green lacewings are delicate insects with a wingspan of 6 to over 65 mm, though the largest forms are tropical. They are characterized by a wide costal field in their wing venation, which includes the cross-veins. The bodies are usually bright green to greenish-brown, and the compound eyes are conspicuously golden in many species. The wings are usually translucent with a slight iridescence; some have green wing veins or a cloudy brownish wing pattern. The vernacular name "stinkflies", used chiefly for Chrysopa species but also for others (e.g. Cunctochrysa) refers to their ability to release a vile smell from paired prothoracic glands when handled.

Adults have tympanal organs at the forewings' base, enabling them to hear well. Some Chrysopa show evasive behavior when they hear a bat's ultrasound calls: when in flight, they close their wings (making their echolocational signature smaller) and drop down to the ground. Green lacewings also use substrate or body vibrations as a form of communication between themselves, especially during courtship. Species which are nearly identical morphologically may sometimes be separated more easily based on their mating signals. For example, the southern European Chrysoperla mediterranea looks almost identical to its northern relative C. carnea, but their courtship "songs" are very different; individuals of one species will not react to the other's vibrations.

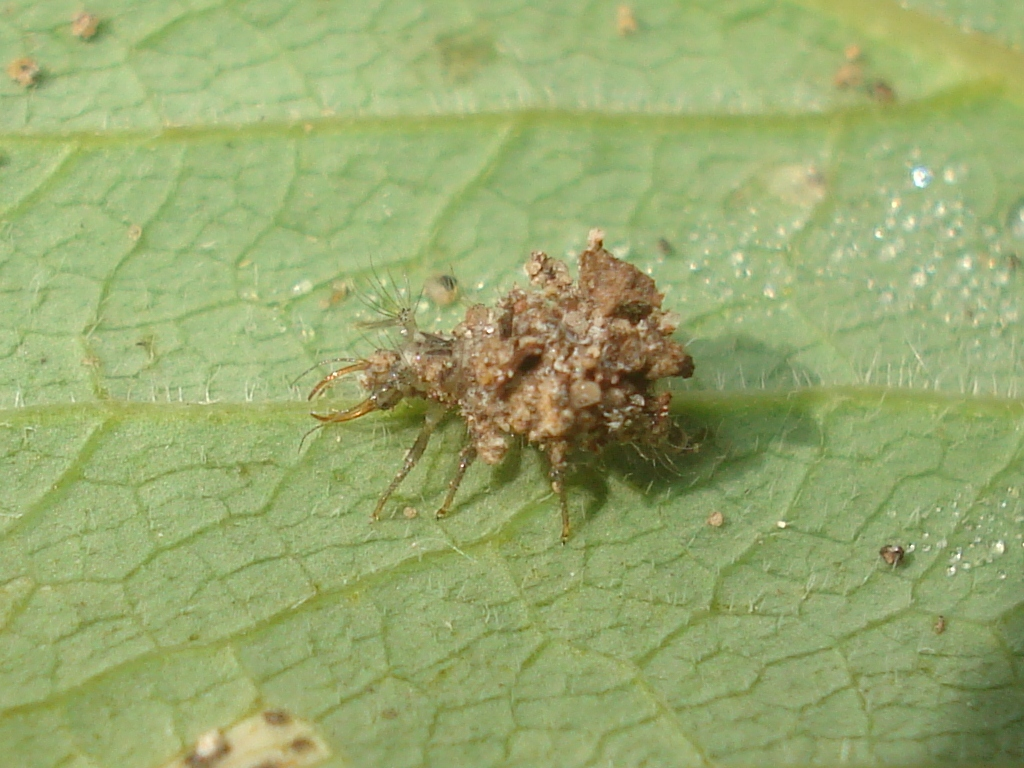
Larva of unknown species (from Latvia) camouflaged with sand grains

Adults are crepuscular or nocturnal. They feed on pollen, nectar and honeydew supplemented with mites, aphids and other small arthropods, and some, namely Chrysopa, are mainly predatory. Others feed almost exclusively on nectar and similar substances, and have symbiotic yeasts in their digestive tract to help break down the food into nutrients.

Larvae have either a more slender "humpbacked" shape with a prominent bulge on the thorax, or are plumper, with long bristles jutting out from the sides. The larva collect and place debris and food remains on these bristles – the empty integuments of aphids, most notably – that provide camouflage from ants (and birds).

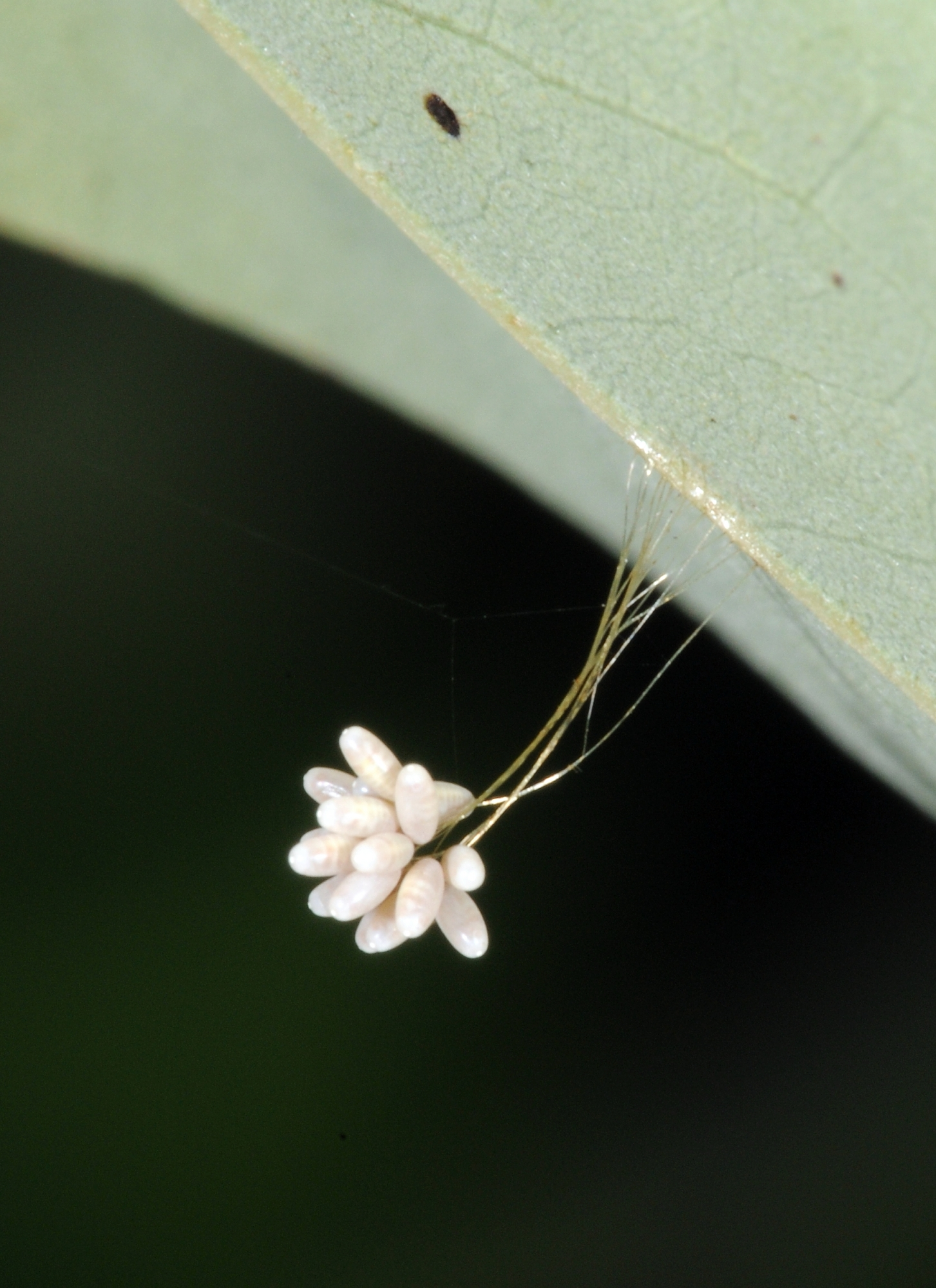
Stalked eggs of unknown species, Mainzer Sand (Rhineland-Palatinate, Germany)

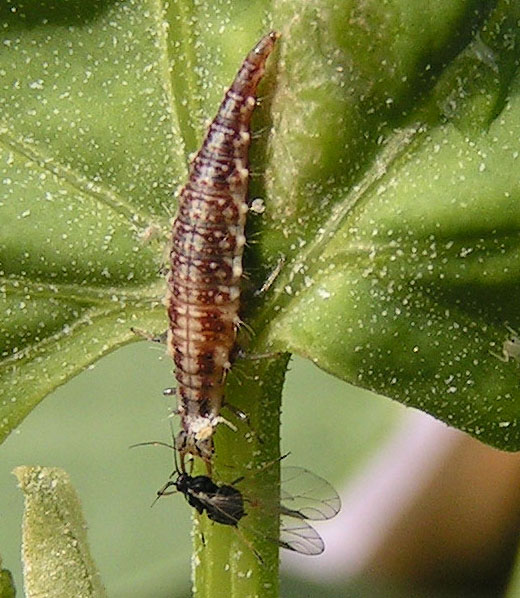
Larva of a species in the Chrysoperla carnea group feeding on an aphid

Eggs are deposited at night, singly or in small groups; one female produces some 100–200 eggs. Eggs are placed on plants, usually where aphids are present nearby in numbers. Each egg is hung on a slender stalk about 1 cm long, usually on the underside of a leaf. Immediately after hatching, the larvae moult, then crawl up the egg stalk to feed. They are voracious predators, attacking most insects of suitable size, especially soft-bodied ones (aphids, caterpillars and other insect larvae, insect eggs, and at high population densities also each other). The larvae may also occasionally bite humans, possibly out of either aggression or hunger. Therefore, the larvae are colloquially known as "aphid lions" (also spelled "aphidlions") or "aphid wolves", similar to the related antlions. Their senses are weakly developed, except that they are very sensitive to touch. Walking around in a haphazard fashion, the larvae sway their heads from one side to the other, and when they strike a potential prey object, the larva grasps it. Their maxillae are hollow, allowing a digestive secretion to be injected in the prey; the organs of an aphid can for example be dissolved by this in 90 seconds. Depending on environmental conditions, pupation which takes place in a cocoon takes about 1–3 weeks; species from temperate regions usually overwinter as a prepupa, though C. carnea overwinters as newly hatched adults.

=== Use in biological pest control ===
While depending on species and environmental conditions, some green lacewings will eat only about 150 prey items in their entire lives, in other cases 100 aphids will be eaten in a single week. Thus, in several countries, millions of such voracious Chrysopidae are reared for sale as biological control agents of insect and mite pests in agriculture and gardens. They are distributed as eggs, since as noted above they are highly aggressive and cannibalistic in confined quarters; the eggs hatch in the field. Their performance is variable; thus, there is interest in further research to improve the use of green lacewings as biological pest control. Species that have hitherto attracted wider study and are more or less readily available as captive-bred eggs to deposit out for hatching in pest-infested plant cultures are several members of Chrysoperla as well as Mallada signatus. They are a natural predator of the European corn borer, a moth that costs the US agriculture industry more than $1 billion annually in crop losses and population control.

Gardeners can attract these lacewings – and therefore ensure a steady supply of larvae – by using certain companion plants and tolerating beneficial weeds. Chrysopidae are attracted mainly by Asteraceae – e.g. calliopsis (Coreopsis), cosmos (Cosmos), sunflowers (Helianthus) and dandelion (Taraxacum) – and Apiaceae such as dill (Anethum) or angelica (Angelica).

== Systematics and taxonomy ==
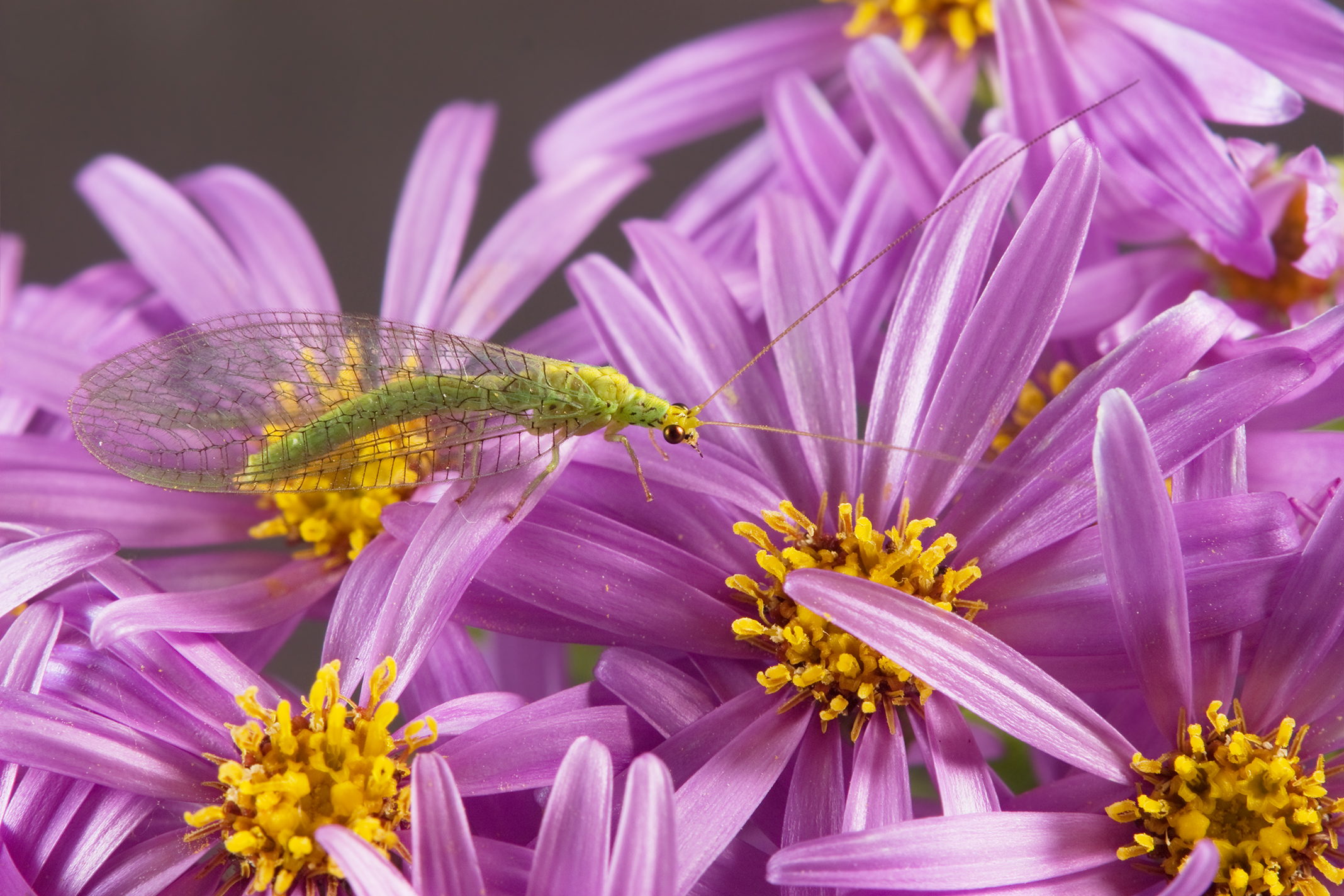
Chrysopa sp.

For a long time, green lacewings were considered close relatives of the pleasing lacewings (Dilaridae) and brown lacewings (Hemerobiidae) and placed in the superfamily Hemerobioidea. Belam But this grouping does not appear to be natural and misled most significantly by the supposed hemerobioideans' plesiomorphic larvae. Today, the Hemerobioidea are usually considered monotypic, containing only the brown lacewings; the green lacewings seem to be very closely related to the osmylids (Osmylidae), which have much more advanced larvae superficially resembling those of the spongillaflies (Sisyridae) with which the spongillaflies were thus formerly allied. Thus the superfamily Osmyloidea – also monotypic following the spongillaflies' removal from there – is the closest living relative of green lacewings; some Mesozoic taxa have been placed in families even closer to Chrysopidae (Ascalochrysidae and Mesochrysopidae) and united with these to superfamily Chrysopoidea.

== Subfamilies and genera ==
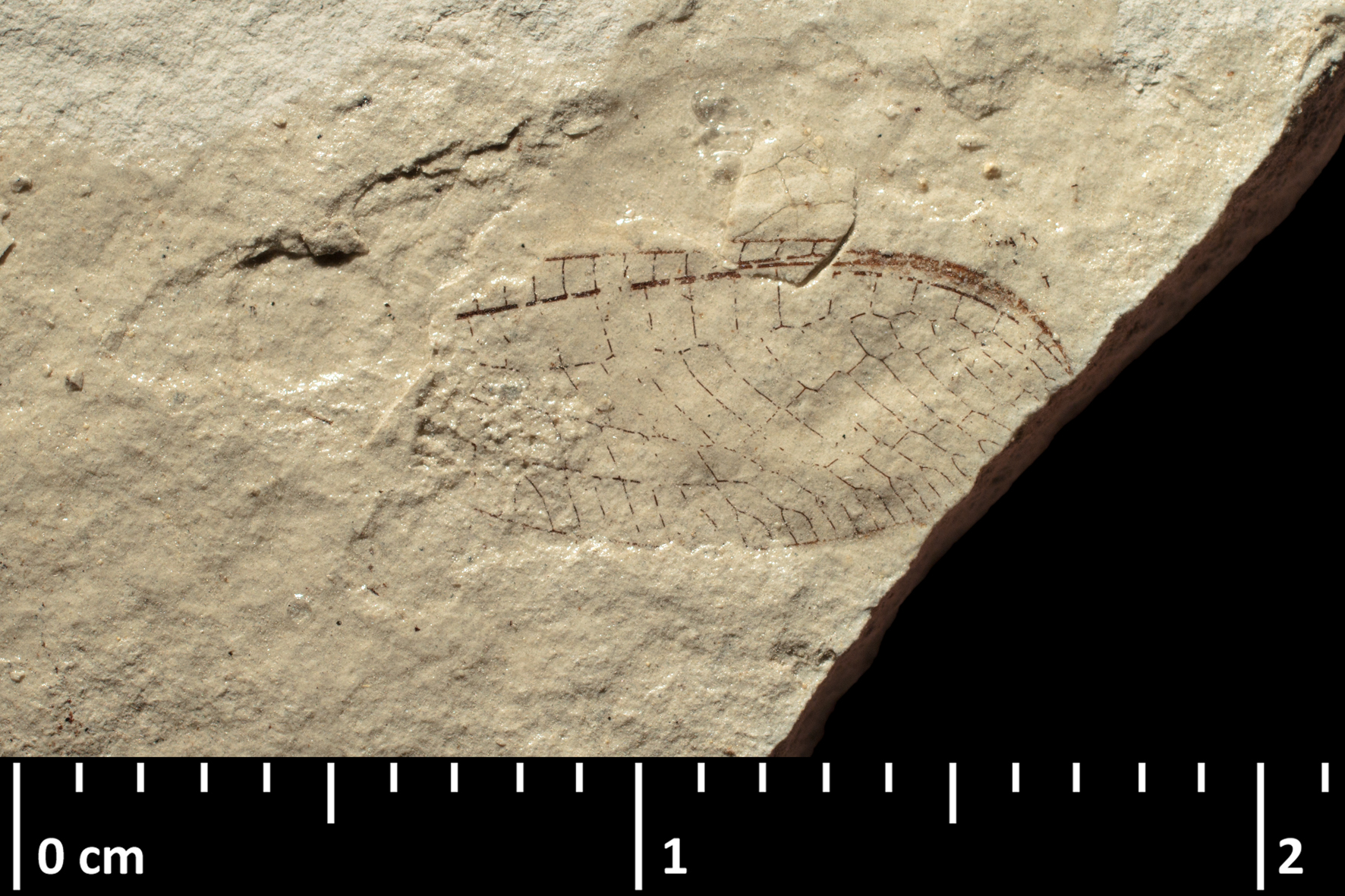
Paleochrysopa monteilsensis holotype wing

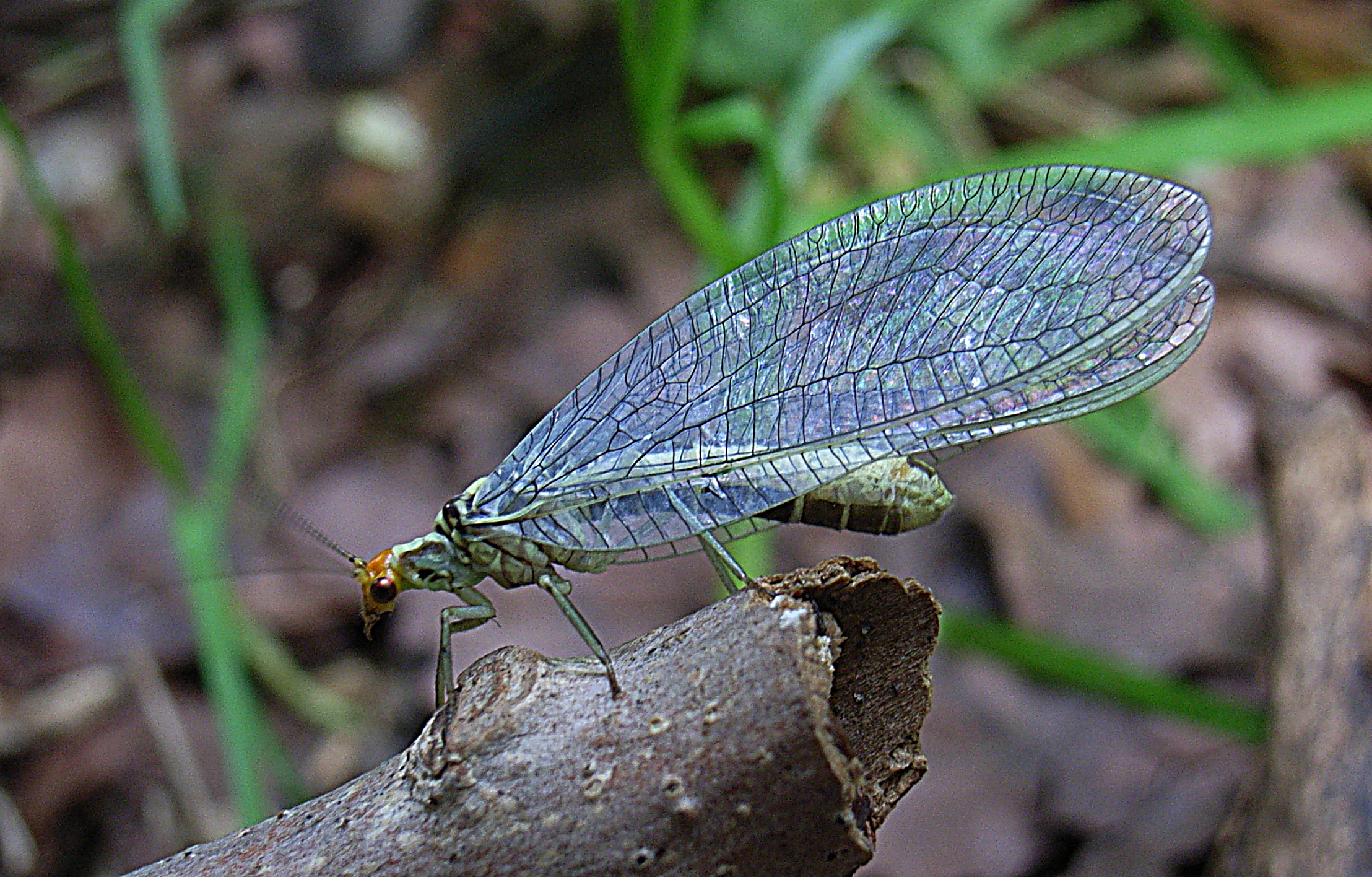
Nothochrysa fulviceps (Nothochrysinae)

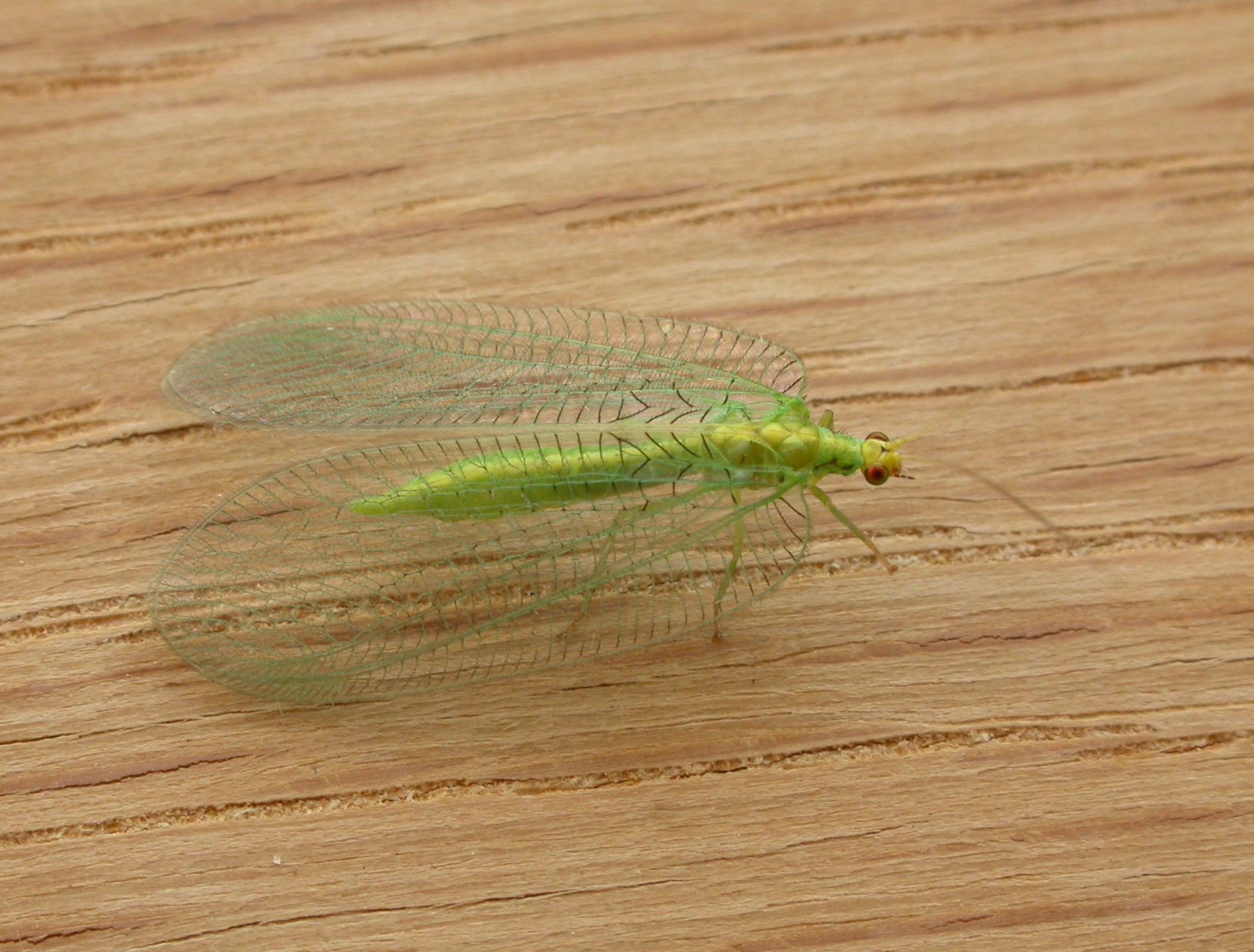
Nothancyla verreauxi (Apochrysinae)

The living genera of Chrysopidae are divided into one very large and two smaller subfamilies; a few genera are not robustly assigned to either of these yet. Compared to other Neuroptera, which have an extensive, sometimes extremely abundant, fossil record, green lacewings are not known from that many fossils, and these are not generally well-studied. Their prehistoric relatives mentioned above, however, indicate that at least the basal radiation of the Chrysopoidea must have happened in the Jurassic already, if not earlier.

=== Subfamily Apochrysinae Handlirsch, 1908 ===
- Apochrysa (including Anapochrysa, Lauraya, Nacaura, Oligochrysa, Synthochrysa)
- Domenechus
- Joguina – sometimes includes Lainius
- Lainius Navás, 1913
- Loyola (including Claverina)
- Nobilinus
- Nothancyla

=== Subfamily Chrysopinae ===
There are over 60 genera placed in four tribes:

- Ankylopterygini Navas, 1910
  - Six genera
- Belonopterygini Navas, 1913
  - Fifteen genera
- Chrysopini Schneider, 1851
  - Thirty-two genera
- Leucochrysini Adams, 1978
  - Seven genera
- Incertae sedis
  - Three genera are not placed within any specific tribe

Information on localities of fossil chrysopids is taken from the Paleobiology Database unless otherwise noted.

=== †Subfamily Limaiinae Martins-Neto & Vulcano, 1988 ===
- †Aberrantochrysa Khramov, 2018 Khasurty locality, Russia, Early Cretaceous (Aptian)
- †Araripechrysa Martins-Neto & Vulcano, 1988 Crato Formation, Brazil, Early Cretaceous (Aptian)
- †Baisochrysa Makarkin, 1997 Karabastau Formation, Kazakhstan, Middle/Late Jurassic (Callovian/Oxfordian) Zaza Formation, Russia, Early Cretaceous (Aptian)
- †Cretachrysa Makrakin, 1994 Ola Formation, Russia, Late Cretaceous (Campanian)
- †Drakochrysa Yang & Hong, 1990 Laiyang Formation, China, Aptian
- †Limaia Martins-Neto & Vulcano, 1988 Crato Formation, Brazil, Aptian
- †Mesypochrysa Martynov, 1927 Daohugou locality, China, Callovian, Karabastau Formation, Kazakhstan, Callovian/Oxfordian, Durlston Formation, United Kingdom, Early Cretaceous (Berriasian), Yixian Formation, China, Aptian Dzun-Bain Formation, Mongolia, Aptian, Khasurty, Zaza Formation, Russia, Aptian
- †Parabaisochrysa Lu et al., 2018 Burmese amber, Myanmar, Late Cretaceous (Cenomanian)
- †Protochrysa Willmann & Brooks, 1991 Yixian Formation, China, Early Cretaceous (Aptian) Kamloops Group, Canada, Fur Formation, Denmark, Eocene (Ypresian)

=== Subfamily Nothochrysinae Navas, 1910 ===
- †Adamsochrysa Makarkin & Archibald, 2013 Kamloops Group, Canada, Klondike Mountain Formation, Washington, USA, Eocene (Ypresian)
- †Archaeochrysa Ootsa Lake Formation, Canada, Eocene (Ypresian), Florissant Formation, Colorado, USA Eocene (Priabonian), Creede Formation, Colorado, USA, Oligocene (Chattian)
- †Asiachrysa Makarkin, 2014 Tadushi Formation, Russia, Eocene (Ypresian)
- Asthenochrysa
- †Cimbrochrysa Schlüter, 1982 Fur Formation, Denmark, Eocene (Ypresian) Florissant Formation, Colorado, USA Eocene (Priabonian),
- Dictyochrysa
- †Dyspetochrysa Florissant Formation, Colorado, USA Eocene (Priabonian),
- Hypochrysa
- Kimochrysa
- Leptochrysa Adams & Penny, 1992
- †Lithochrysa Ootsa Lake Formation, Canada, Eocene (Ypresian), Florissant Formation, Colorado, USA Eocene (Priabonian)
- Nothochrysa McLachlan, 1868
- †Okanaganochrysa Makarkin & Archibald, 2013 Kamloops Group, Canada, Eocene (Ypresian)
- †Palaeochrysa Scudder, 1883 Kishenehn Formation Montana, United States, Eocene (Lutetian), Florissant Formation, Colorado, USA Eocene (Priabonian)
- Pamochrysa Tjeder, 1966
- Pimachrysa
- †Pronothochrysa Peñalver et al., 1995 La Rinconada, Spain, Early Miocene
- †Pseudochrysopa Makarkin & Archibald, 2013 Ootsa Lake Formation, Canada, Eocene (Ypresian)
- †Sinonothochrysa Huang et al., 2021 Buxin Formation, China, Paleocene (Selandian)
- †Tribochrysa Florissant Formation, Colorado, USA Eocene (Priabonian), Antero Formation, Colorado, USA, Oligocene (Rupelian)
- Triplochrysa

=== Subfamily Incertae sedis ===
- †Danochrysa Willmann, 1993 Fur Formation, Denmark, Eocene (Ypresian)
- Sinochrysa Yang, 1992
- †Stephenbrooksia Willmann, 1993 Fur Formation, Denmark, Eocene (Ypresian)
- Tibetochrysa Yang, 1988
