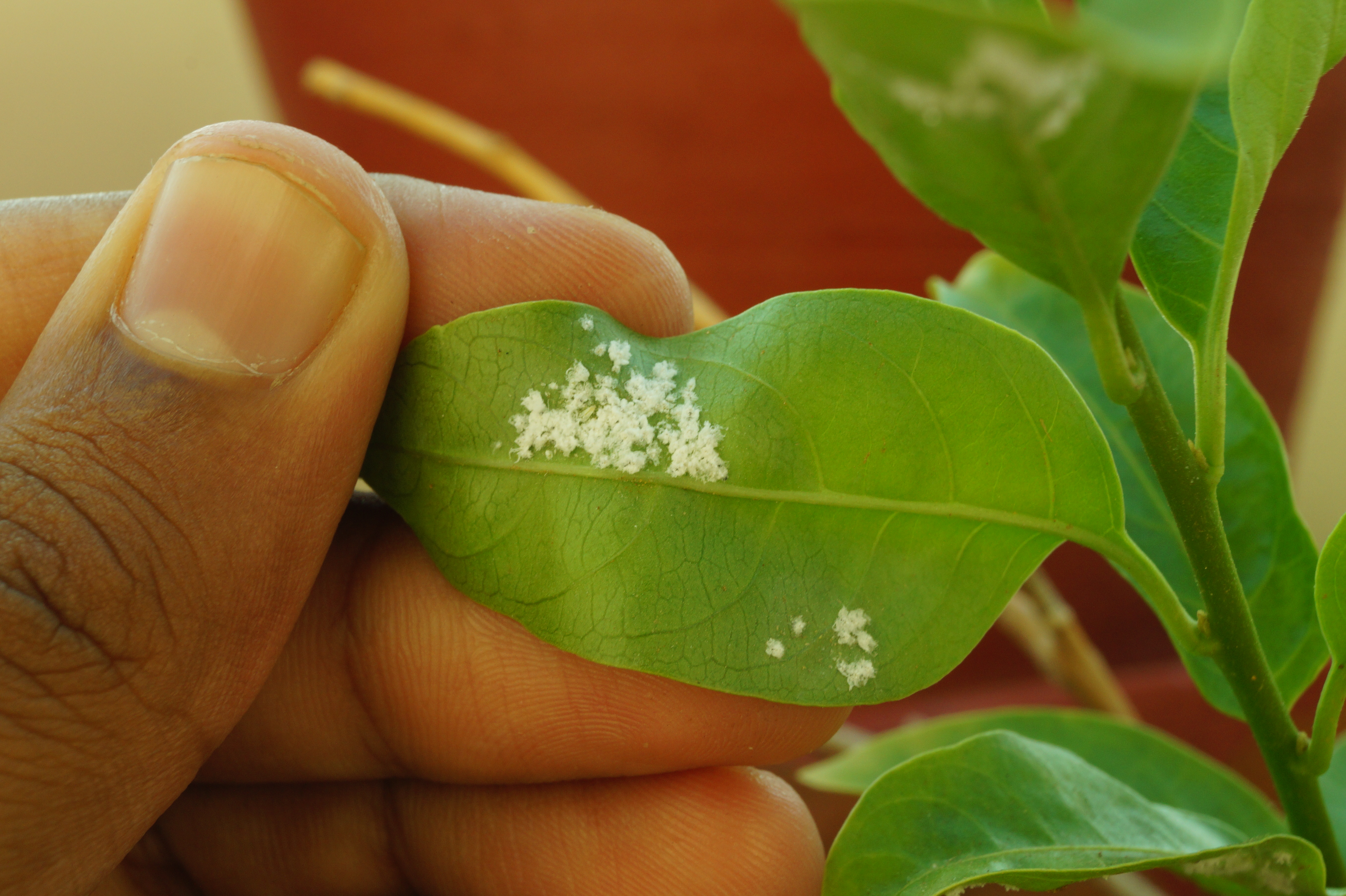
- Woolly aphid on jasmine leaf

Scientific classification
- Kingdom: Animalia
- Phylum: Arthropoda
- Clade: Pancrustacea
- Class: Insecta
- Order: Hemiptera
- Suborder: Sternorrhyncha
- Family: Aphididae
- Subfamily: Eriosomatinae

Tribes
- Eriosomatini; Fordini; Pemphigini

= Eriosomatinae =

Woolly aphids

Subfamily of aphids

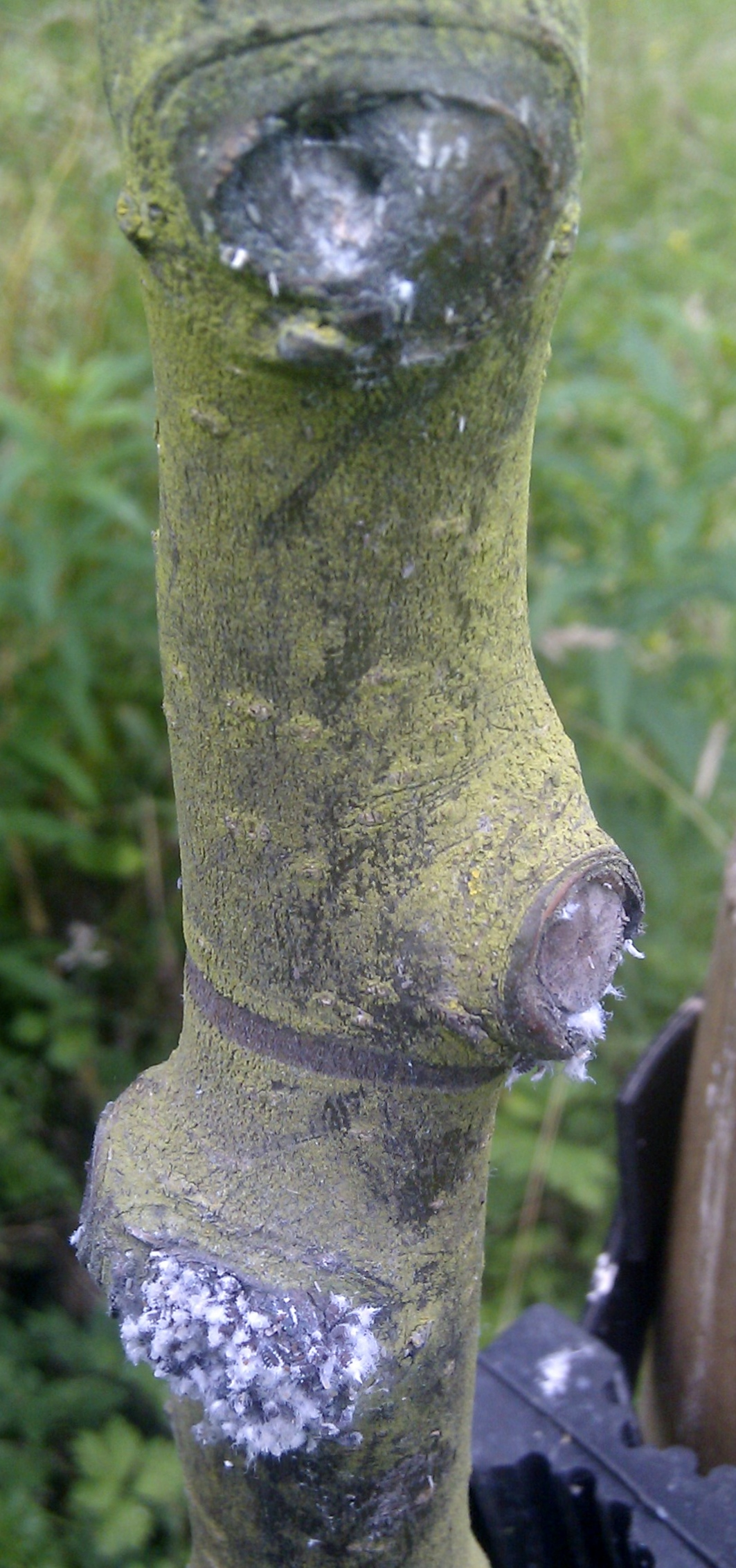
Woolly aphids on crab apple bark.

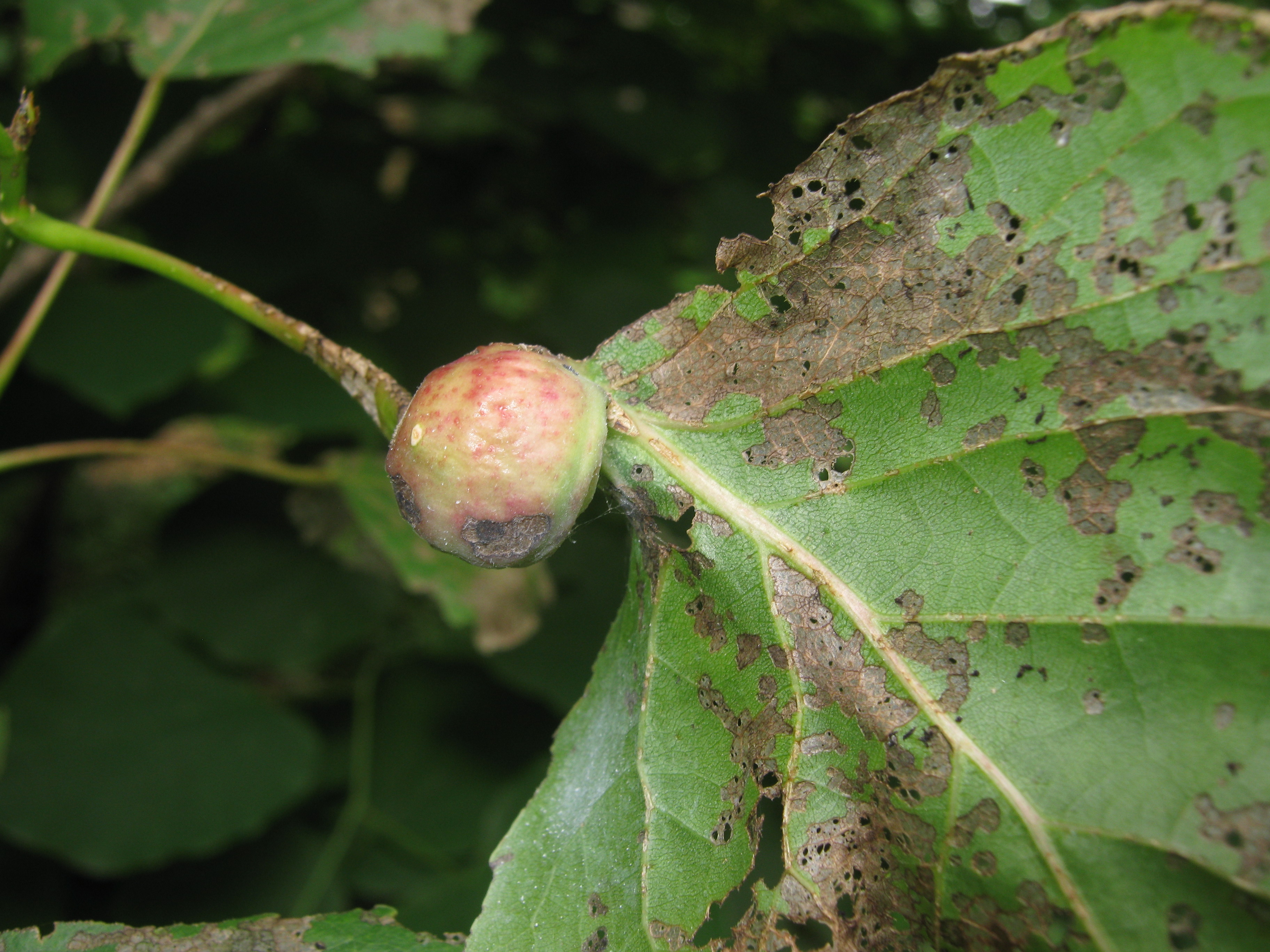
Pemphigus gall on cottonwood tree

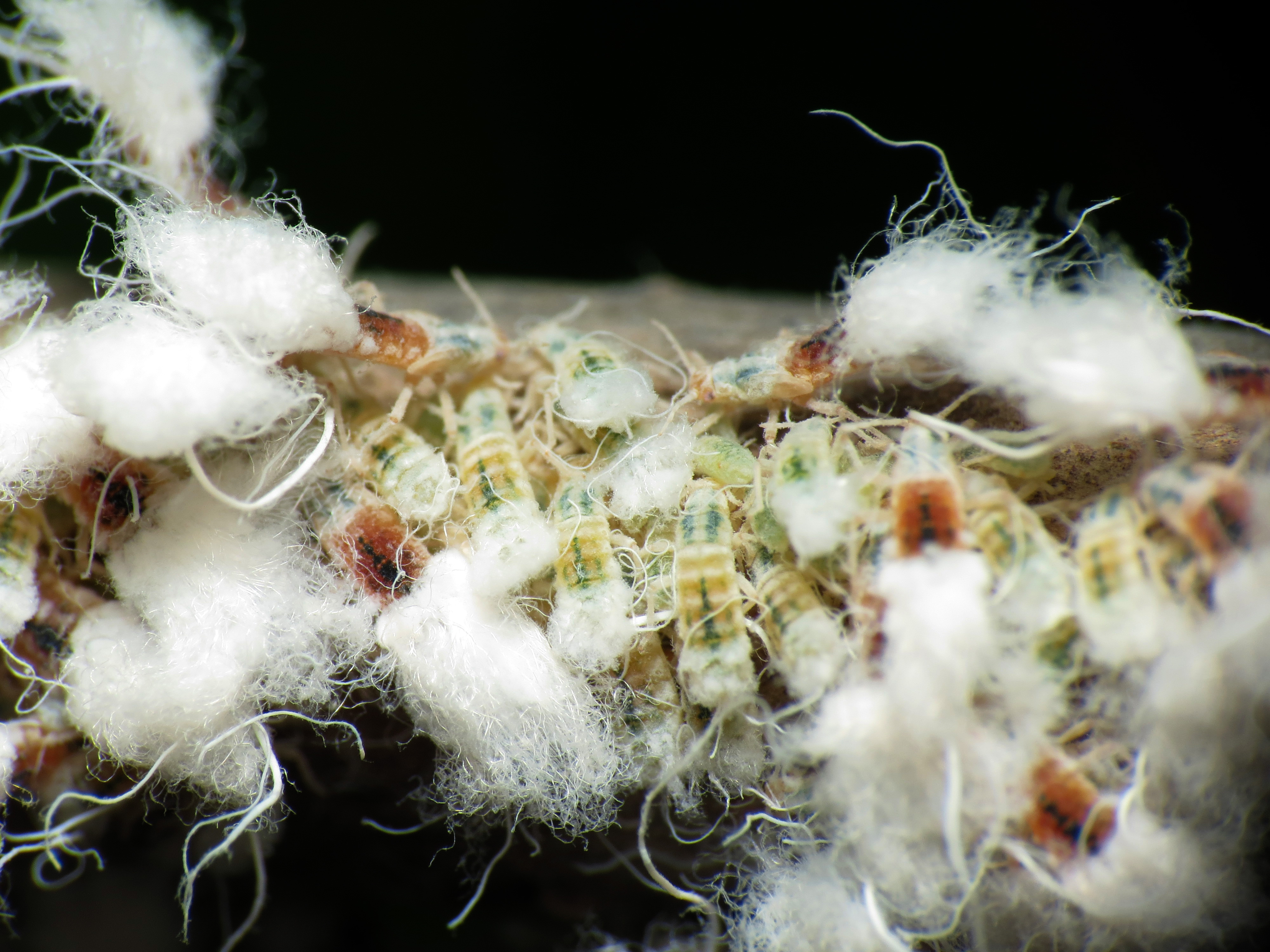
Grylloprociphilus imbricator on Fagus

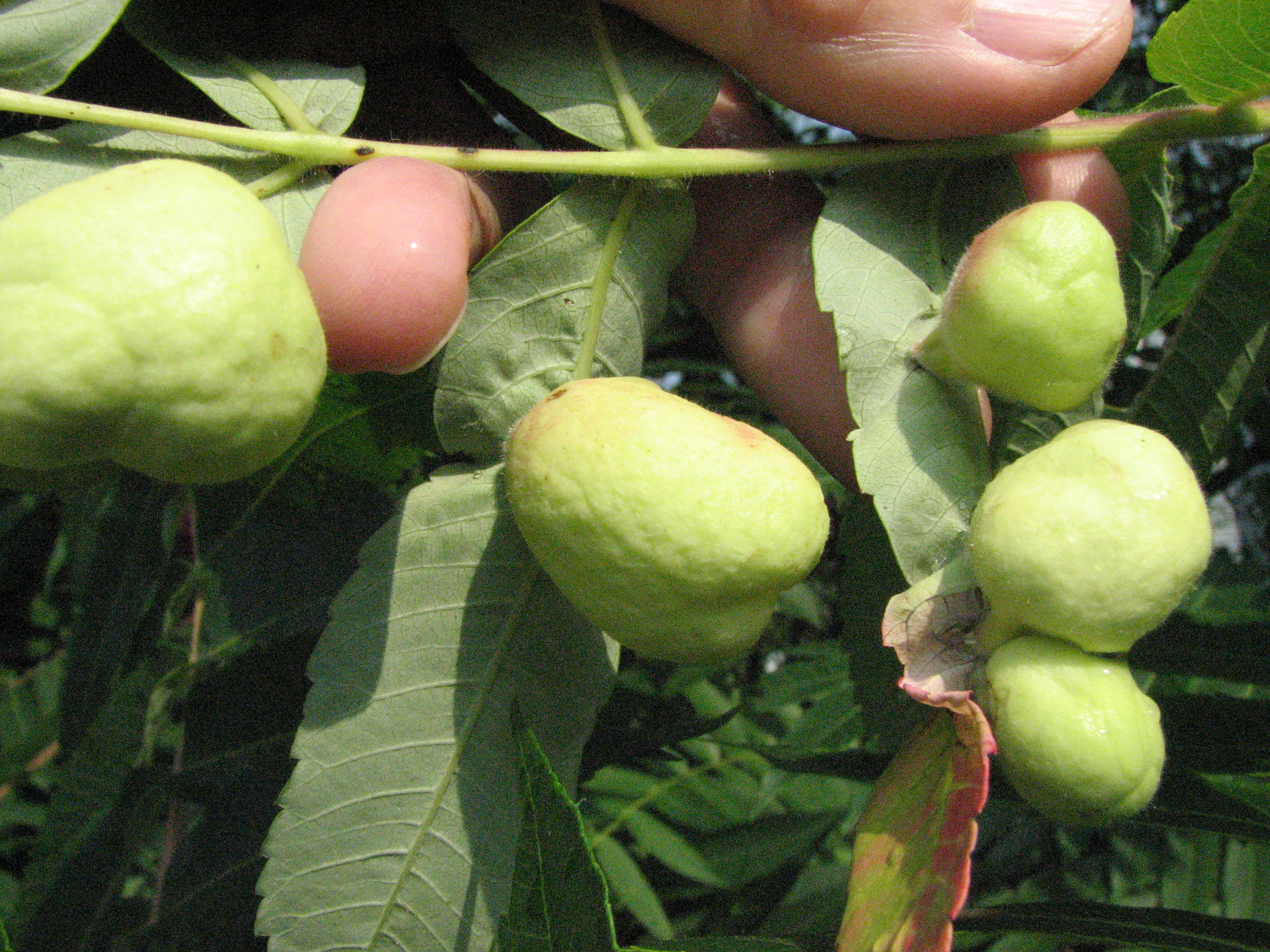
Galls made by Melaphis rhois

Woolly aphids (subfamily: Eriosomatinae) are sap-sucking insects that produce a filamentous waxy white covering which resembles cotton or wool. The adults are winged and move to new locations where they lay egg masses. The nymphs often form large cottony masses on twigs, for protection from predators.

Woolly aphids occur worldwide. Many of the numerous species have only one host plant species, or alternating generations on two specific hosts. They have been known to cause botanical damage and are often considered a pest. While most damage is minor, they can spread plant diseases and fungi. Some species can produce galls as well.

In flight they have been described as looking like "flying mice." Other nicknames include "angel flies", “cotton fairies”, "fluff bugs", "fairy flies", "ash bugs", "snow bugs", "fluffer fairies", "preachers", "poodle flies", “ghost bugs”, and "fluffy gnats".

== Diet ==
Woolly aphids feed by inserting their needle-like mouthparts into plant tissue to withdraw sap. They are able to feed on leaves, buds, bark, and even the roots of the plant. As a result of feeding on the sap, woolly aphids produce a sticky substance known as honeydew, which can lead to sooty mold on the plant.

== Botanical damage ==
Woolly aphids generally are not much cause for alarm, although they can cause unsightly damage to plants, which is particularly a problem for growers of ornamental plants. Symptoms caused by their feeding on a plant include twisted and curled leaves, yellowed foliage, poor plant growth, low plant vigor, and branch dieback.

The woolly apple aphid, Eriosoma lanigerum is a widespread pest of fruit trees, feeding principally on apple, but also, pears, hawthorn, ash, alders, elms and oaks. Gall making species include Melaphis rhois and Pemphigus spp.

Further minor damage can be caused by the honeydew that woolly aphids secrete, which is difficult to remove. While the honeydew itself doesn't cause too much of a problem, the honeydew can cause sooty mold to grow, which can block some of the sunlight needed for photosynthesis.

Woolly aphids and other sucking insects are often vectors of transmission for powdery mildew (a white fungus which grows on above ground parts of some plants), and other infectious diseases. Typically woolly aphids in subtemperate climates precede and are an indicator of various plant infections, including powdery mildew. Aphids penetrate plant surfaces where they often reside and provide a host of potential inoculants through physical, digestive or fecal secretions. Aphids are often an indicator of other potential plant problems.

== Taxonomy ==
The subfamily Eriosomatinae has recently been placed within the family Aphididae. It was previously placed in family Pemphigidae = Eriosomatidae, but that taxon is no longer valid.

== Tribes and genera ==
=== Tribe Eriosomatini ===
- Aphidounguis
- Byrsocryptoides
- Colopha
- Colophina
- Eriosoma
- Gharesia
- Hemipodaphis
- Kaltenbachiella
- Paracolopha
- Schizoneurata
- Schizoneurella
- Siciunguis
- Tetraneura
- Zelkovaphis

=== Tribe Fordini ===
- Aloephagus
- Aploneura
- Asiphonella
- Baizongia
- Chaetogeoica
- Dimelaphis
- Forda
- Geoica
- Geopemphigus
- Kaburagia
- Melaphis
- Nurudea
- Paracletus
- Rectinasus
- Schlechtendalia
- Slavum
- Smynthurodes
- Tramaforda

=== Tribe Pemphigini ===
- Ceratopemphigiella
- Ceratopemphigus
- Clydesmithia
- Cornaphis
- Diprociphilus
- Epipemphigus
- Formosaphis
- Gootiella
- Grylloprociphilus
- Mimeuria
- Mordwilkoja
- Neopemphigus
- Neoprociphilus
- Pachypappa
- Pachypappella
- Patchiella
- Pemphigus
- Prociphilus
- Thecabius
- Tiliphagus
- Uichancoella

== See also ==
- Mealybug
