= R. chinensis =

R. chinensis may refer to:

- Rhus chinensis, a plant species found in China
- Rosa chinensis, the China rose, a plant species native to central China

== See also ==
- Chinensis (disambiguation)
