= M. chinensis =

M. chinensis may refer to:

- Melaphis chinensis, the Chinese sumac aphid, an aphid species
- Morea chinensis, a synonym for Iris domestica, the blackberry lily, leopard flower or leopard lily, an ornamental plant species

== See also ==
- Chinensis (disambiguation)
