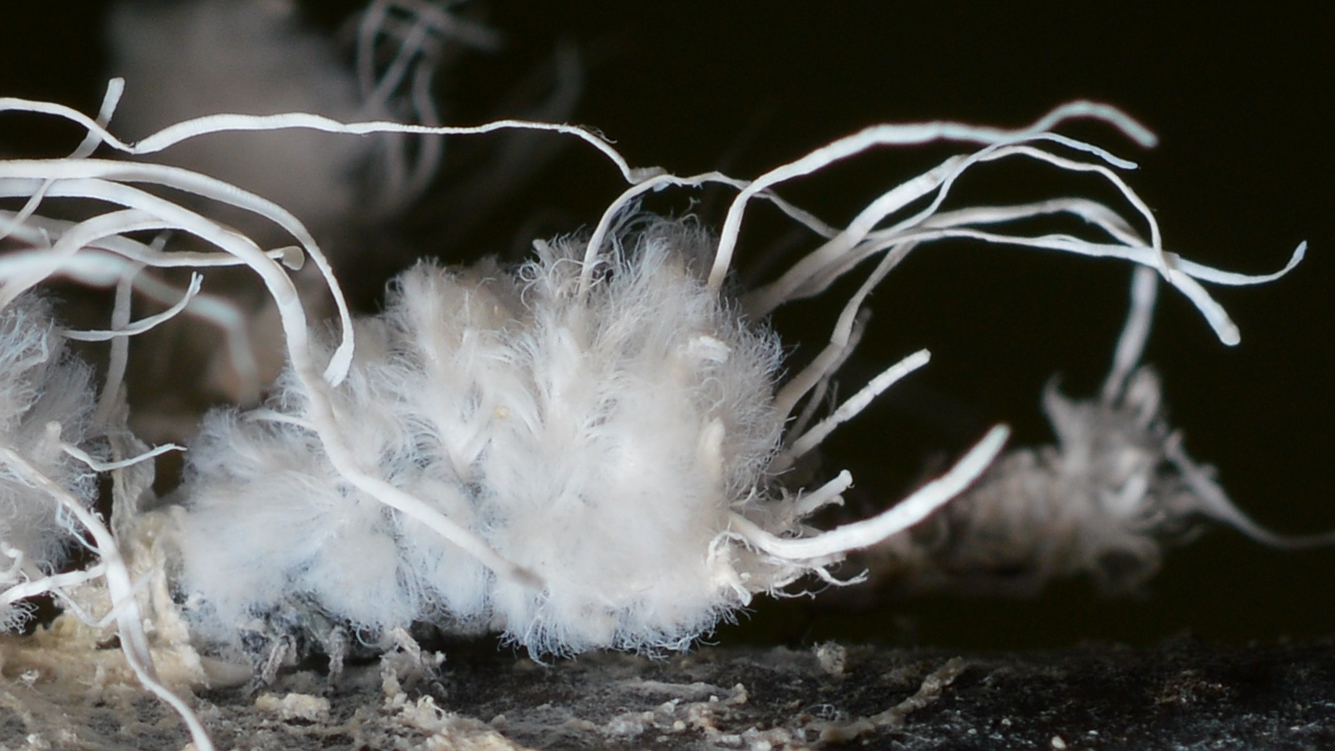
- Prociphilus tessellatus, Ontario, Canada

Scientific classification
- Domain: Eukaryota
- Kingdom: Animalia
- Phylum: Arthropoda
- Class: Insecta
- Order: Hemiptera
- Suborder: Sternorrhyncha
- Family: Aphididae
- Subfamily: Eriosomatinae
- Genus: Prociphilus
- Species: P. tessellatus

Binomial name
- Prociphilus tessellatus (Fitch, 1851)

= Prociphilus tessellatus =

Species of true bug

Prociphilus tessellatus, known generally as the woolly alder aphid or maple blight aphid, is a species of aphid in the family Aphididae.
