= Mordwilkoja =

- Mordwilkoja gall on Populus deltoides

Scientific classification
- Kingdom: Animalia
- Phylum: Arthropoda
- Clade: Pancrustacea
- Class: Insecta
- Order: Hemiptera
- Suborder: Sternorrhyncha
- Family: Aphididae
- Genus: Mordwilkoja
- Species: M. vagabunda

Binomial name
- Mordwilkoja vagabunda (Walsh, 1863)

Synonyms
- Byrsocrypta vagabunda Walsh, 1863; Parathecabius stammeri Zwölfer, 1957; Pemphigus oestlundi Cockerell, 1906; Pemphigus vagabondus (Walsh, 1863)

Genus of aphid

Mordwilkoja vagabunda, the poplar vagabond aphid, is a species of gall-forming aphid found primarily in eastern North America. It is the only species in the monotypic genus Mordwilkoja, named after Russian entomologist Alexander Mordvilko.

== Taxonomy ==
Commonly known as the poplar vagabond aphid, Mordwilkoja is an aphid classified in the subfamily Pemphiginae, tribe Pemphigini.

Mordwilkoja vagabunda was first scientifically described in a December 1862 paper by Benjamin Dann Walsh under the name Byrsocrypta vagabunda. Walsh's paper, on the aphids of the United States, appeared in the first volume of the Proceedings of the Entomological Society of Philadelphia, printed in 1863. He provided a physical description based on eleven specimens which he collected near Rock Island, Illinois. He gave it the specific name vagabunda on the basis of its "habit ... of wandering to very great distances in its native forests", knowing "nothing of its hosts". Walsh described only the insect and did not know that it produced poplar galls. In 1867, Walsh wrote a paper for the sixth volume of its Proceedings on plant galls, and in a lengthy footnote moved species he had previously classed as Byrsocrypta to the genus Pemphigus, including B. vagabunda; a later publication by him and Charles Valentine Riley confirmed this placement. In 1909, Giacomo del Guercio published a short paper in the Italian journal Rivista di Patologia Vegetale (transl. Journal of Plant Pathology), creating a new genus Mordwilkoja, to accommodate the species Walsh had described. Del Guercio named the new genus in honour of a "distinguished Russian entomologist", Alexander Mordvilko. Some sources spell the genus name Mordvilkoja.

In 1957, Helmut Zwölfer described a species of anholocyclic aphids found on yellow loosestrife (Lysimachia vulgaris), which he named Parathecabius stammeri in honour of his professor H. J. Stammer. In 2005, the species was synonymized with Mordwilkoja.

== Life cycle and gall formation ==
=== Host plants ===
Mordwilkoja vagabunda infests poplar species as its primary host, affecting:

- Populus deltoides (eastern cottonwood; central & eastern NA)
- Populus acuminata (lanceleaf cottonwood; western NA)
- Populus balsamifera (balsam poplar; northern NA)
- Populus nigra (black poplar; Eurasia)

Loosestrife (Lysimachia) species are secondary hosts, including:

- Lysimachia quadrifolia (whorled loosestrife; eastern NA)
- Lysimachia terrestris (lake loosestrife; eastern NA)
- Lysimachia vulgaris (yellow loosestrife; Europe)

=== Life cycle and behaviour ===
Generally, host-alternating aphids such as Mordwilkoja mate on their primary host in the autumn, overwinter as eggs, and then emerge in the spring, moving to their secondary host during the summer. The aphids will go through several generations each year, however: first in the spring emerge the fundatrices (stem mothers), which give birth to the fundatrigeniae, and finally the winged and migratory form which fly to the secondary host, where they reproduce by parthenogenesis. After several generations there, an autumn generation of winged aphids (the females known as gynoparae) return to the primary host; the gynoparae will produce the next generation, the females of which, the oviparae, will mate and lay their eggs.

The life cycle of Mordwilkoja was first studied by Carlo Ignoffo and Alexander Granovsky, who published two papers in 1961 on aphid activity gall development, and Clyde Furhiman Smith, who discovered the aphids' secondary host and in 1971 published descriptions of each stage of the life cycle.

The wingless fundatrix generation hatch in the early spring from eggs deposited in small groups in "peripheral pockets of galls" and covered with "wax-like filament". The first generation of fundatrices feed gregariously on stem apices, causing visible reddening and damage which Ignoffo and Granovsky likened to a rose, "each galled stipule likened to a petal". These galls on the stipules are where the fundatrix generation molt, and produce the fundatrigenia generation after the fifth molt. In Ignoffo and Granovsky's study, each fundatrix produced on average 791 fundatriginae, with one productive individual producing more than 1670. The fundatrigeniae pupate inside the galls, and have been recorded to be hosts for a parasitic wasp, Aphelinus mali. In Ignoffo and Granovsky's study area (Minneapolis–St. Paul), the winged (alate) generation first appeared in late June and the migration to the secondary host reached its peak in early July, in the very early morning just after sunrise each day. They land on their secondary host, locally available loosestrife, feeding first on the leaves and stems before descending below ground to attack the roots. They may overwinter on the secondary host or the sexually active generation will migrate back to the poplar trees and mate. They have no functioning mouthparts. Both the male and females go through four moults within two days and then mate; each female deposits one egg a few days later.

=== Galls ===
Mordwilkoja galls are used by inquilines, particularly (in decreasing order of abundance), Chaitophorus populifolia (Aphidae), Anthocoris borealis (Anthocoridae), Chrysopa oculata (Chrysopidae), Haplothrips faurei (Phlaeothripidae), and many others including arachnids, beetles, and moths.

== Distribution ==
Mordwilkoja is widespread in central-northern North America, but is more common in the east. The Global Biodiversity Information Facility (GBIF) includes only sparse records from the West extending from central British Columbia and Salt Lake City, Utah eastwards across the Prairie region to Manitoba and Indiana. There are far more records in the east, especially in southern Manitoba and the Great Lakes region. There are records as far east as New Brunswick. Smith described a similar range in 1971. In the Old World, Zwölfer discovered aphids subsequently identified as Mordwilkoja from one locality near Dechsendorf in Erlangen, Bavaria. In 2010, a paper in the Journal of the Entomological Research Society by two foresters at Bartın University, Turkey reported the discovery of Mordwilkoja aphids and their galls on three black poplars (Populus nigra) in Bartın, the first record of the genus from Asia.

== Bibliography ==
- Del Guercio, Giacomo (1 Aug 1909). "Intorno ad un nuovo genere di Penfigidi americani (Gen. Mordwilkoja Del Guere.)" [On a new genus of American Pemphigidae]. Rivista di Patologia Vegetale. II (in Italian). 4 (1): 10–2. JSTOR 42558204.
- Ignoffo, Carlo M.; Granovsky, Alexander A. (July 1961). "Life History and Gall Development of Mordwilkoja vagabunda (Homoptera: Aphidae) on Populus deltoides". Annals of the Entomological Society of America. 54 (4): 486–99. doi:10.1093/aesa/54.4.486.
- Ignoffo, Carlo M.; Granovsky, Alexander A. (September 1961). "Life History and Gall Development of Mordwilkoja vagabunda (Homoptera: Aphidae) on Populus deltoides. Part II—Gall development". Annals of the Entomological Society of America. 54 (5): 635–641. doi:10.1093/aesa/54.5.635.
- Smith, Clyde F. (Dec 1971). "The life cycle and redescription of Mordvilkoja vagabunda". Proceedings of the Entomological Society of Washington. 73 (4): 359–367 – via Biodiversity Heritage Library.
- Walsh, Benjamin D. (1863) [8 Dec 1862]. "On the genera of Aphidae found in the United States". Proceedings of the Entomological Society of Philadelphia. 1: 294–311 – via Biodiversity Heritage Library.
- Walsh, Benjamin D.; Riley, Charles V. (Feb 1869). "Galls and their architects". The American Entomologist. 1 (6). St. Louis: 101–110.
- Zwölfer, Helmut (Jan 1957). "Zur Systematik, Biologie und ökologie unterirdisch lebender Aphiden". Zeitschrift für Angewandte Entomologie (in German). 40 (4): 443–584. doi:10.1111/j.1439-0418.1957.tb00879.x.
