= Torda =

Torda may refer to:

Localities in Romania

- Torda, a Hungarian name for Turda, a city and municipality in Cluj County
- Tordai-hasadék, a Hungarian name for Cheile Turzii, a natural reserve near Turda

Localities in Serbia

- Torda (Žitište), a village near Žitište, Vojvodina, Serbia

History

- Decree of Torda (14th century)
- Edict of Torda (1568)
- Maros-Torda County, former county of the Kingdom of Hungary
- Torda-Aranyos County, former county of the Kingdom of Hungary
- Torda County, former county of the Kingdom of Hungary, the Eastern Hungarian Kingdom and the Principality of Transylvania

Science

- Torda, a taxonomic synonym for Forda, a genus of aphids
