= P. chinensis =

P. chinensis may refer to:

- Pardanthus chinensis, a synonym for Iris domestica, the blackberry lily, leopard flower or leopard lily, an ornamental plant species
- Polistes chinensis, a wasp species

== See also ==
- Chinensis (disambiguation)
