= G. chinensis =

G. chinensis may refer to:

- Gemmingia chinensis, a synonym for Iris domestica, the blackberry lily, leopard flower or leopard lily, an ornamental plant species
- Gyraulus chinensis, a freshwater snail species

== See also ==
- Chinensis (disambiguation)
