= Forda orientalis =

Scientific classification
- Kingdom: Animalia
- Phylum: Arthropoda
- Class: Insecta
- Order: Hemiptera
- Suborder: Sternorrhyncha
- Family: Aphididae
- Genus: Forda
- Species: F. orientalis

Binomial name
- Forda orientalis David, 1969

Species of aphid

Forda orientalis is a species of aphid. It is a pest of millets.
