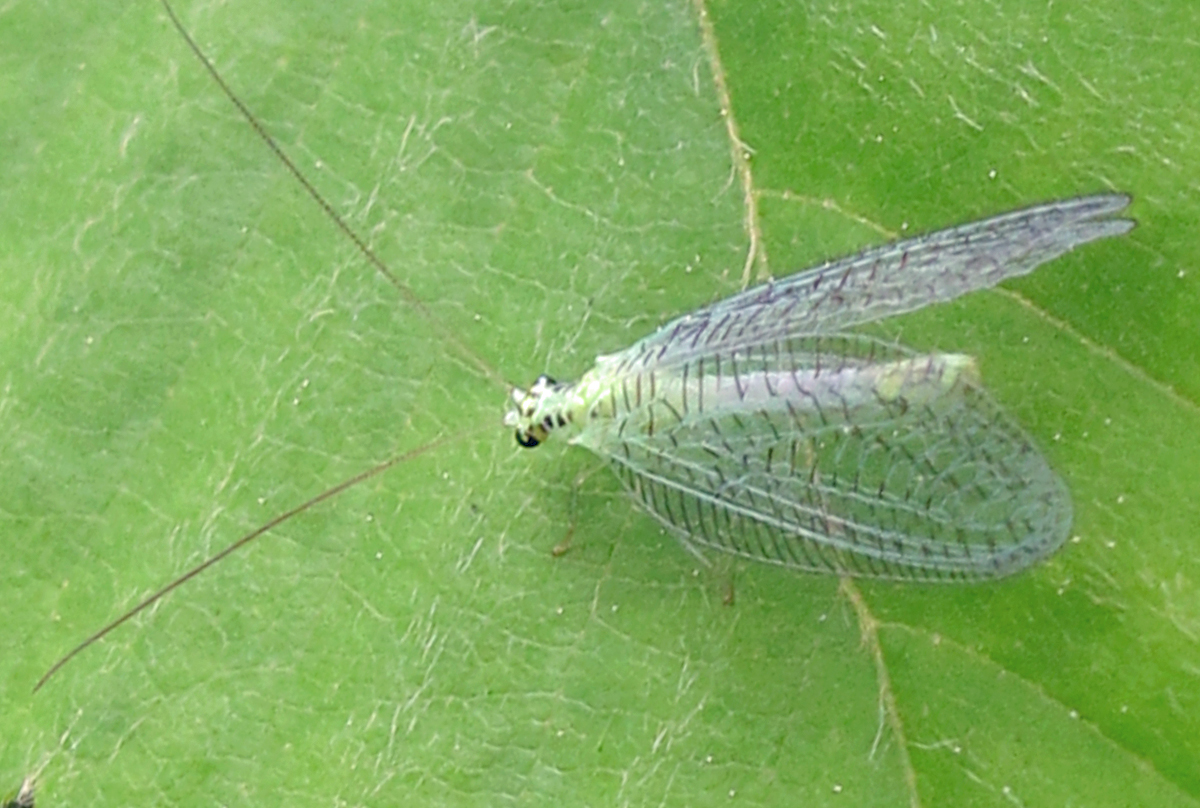

Scientific classification
- Domain: Eukaryota
- Kingdom: Animalia
- Phylum: Arthropoda
- Class: Insecta
- Order: Neuroptera
- Family: Chrysopidae
- Tribe: Chrysopini
- Genus: Chrysopa
- Species: C. chi

Binomial name
- Chrysopa chi Fitch, 1855

= Chrysopa chi =

Species of lacewing

Chrysopa chi is a species of green lacewing in the family Chrysopidae. It is found in North America.
