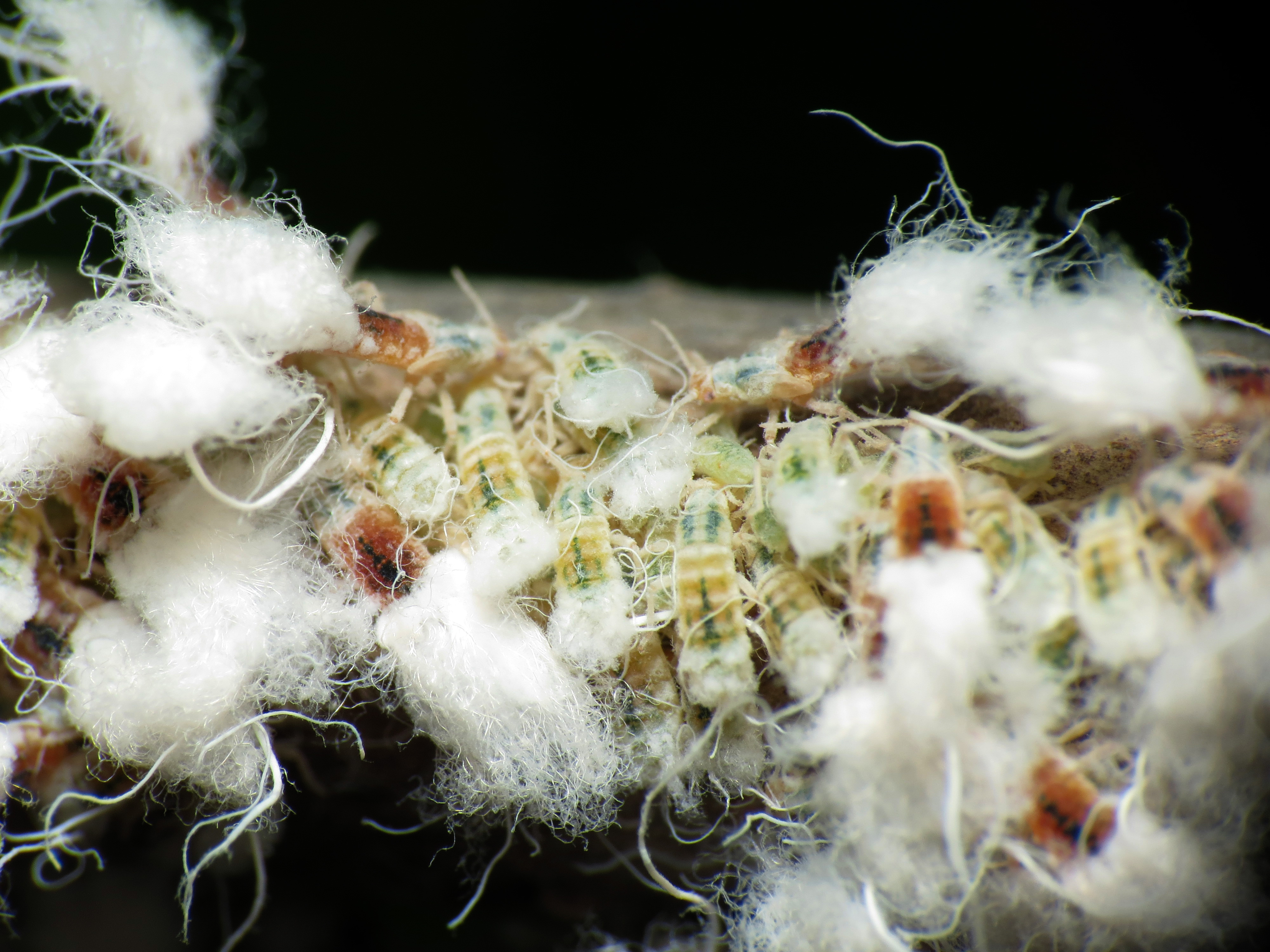
- Beech blight aphids

Scientific classification
- Kingdom: Animalia
- Phylum: Arthropoda
- Clade: Pancrustacea
- Class: Insecta
- Order: Hemiptera
- Suborder: Sternorrhyncha
- Family: Aphididae
- Genus: Grylloprociphilus
- Species: G. imbricator

Binomial name
- Grylloprociphilus imbricator (Fitch, 1851)

= Beech blight aphid =

Species of true bug

The beech blight aphid (Grylloprociphilus imbricator) is a small insect in the order Hemiptera that feeds primarily on the sap of American beech trees. The aphids form dense colonies on small branches and the undersides of leaves. A secondary host, based on their geographic location, is the roots of the bald cypress (Taxodium distichum), where some aphids alternate between hosts and others remain with Taxodium distichum year-round.

The aphids themselves are a light bluish color with bodies covered with long, white, waxy filaments giving them a woolly appearance. They first become apparent in July and as populations continue to grow they become increasingly noticeable. Very high numbers can be seen on individual branches, sometimes extending onto leaves. Infested trees may appear to have their branches and twigs covered with snow. This aphid has a defensive behaviour in that it raises the posterior end of its body and sways from side to side when disturbed. Many aphids performing this action at the same time has led to this species being referred to as the "Boogie-Woogie Aphid".

Beech blight aphids moving in unison

Deposits of sooty mold caused by the fungus Scorias spongiosa build up below the colonies, growing on the copious amounts of honeydew the insects exude. Multiple ant species are attracted, gleaning honeydew beneath aphid feeding areas at beech trees and tending aphids at the cypress tree sites.

The aphids do not usually cause much damage to overall tree health, but dieback is occasionally seen on very heavily infested branches. If infestations are heavy, twigs may die, but damage to the tree is usually minor. The aphids can be blasted off with a jet of water or can be controlled with any insecticides labeled for aphids. A wetting agent should be included to help penetrate the waxy body covering of the insect. Horticultural oil sprays and insecticidal soap have also been used successfully. Several parasites are known to attack this aphid and it is thought that they will in time be effective in reducing the population numbers of aphids.
