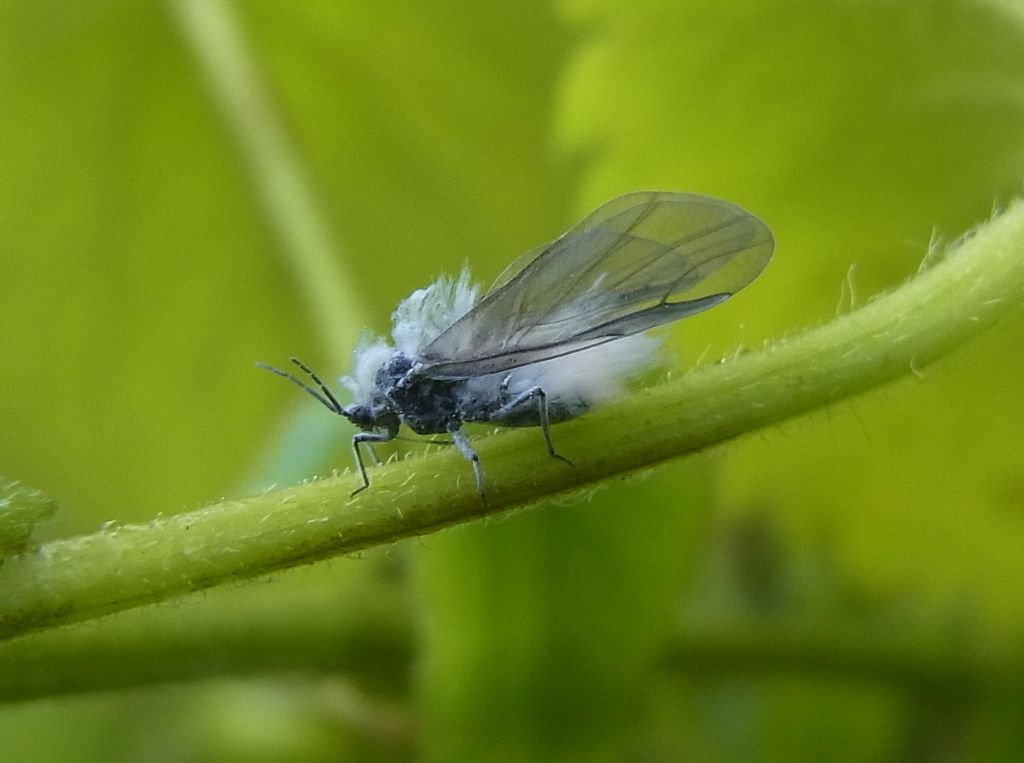
- Prociphilus oriens

Scientific classification
- Kingdom: Animalia
- Phylum: Arthropoda
- Class: Insecta
- Order: Hemiptera
- Suborder: Sternorrhyncha
- Family: Aphididae
- Tribe: Pemphigini
- Genus: Prociphilus; Koch, 1857

= Prociphilus =

Genus of true bugs

Prociphilus is an aphid genus of the subfamily Eriosomatinae, which cause the plants they attack to produce galls. The aphids reside and feed within the gall.

There are around 50 species in this genus.

The appearance of Prociphilus oriens is often said to presage the first snowfall in Hokkaido and Tohoku. Prociphilus oriens is commonly called yukimushi (雪虫), literally translating to "snow bug", in Japan.

== Species ==
These species belong to the genus Prociphilus:

- Prociphilus americanus (Walker, 1852)
- Prociphilus aomoriensis (Matsumura, 1917)
- Prociphilus aurus Zhang & Qiao, 1997
- Prociphilus baicalensis (Cholodkovsky, 1920)
- Prociphilus bumeliae (Schrank, 1801)
- Prociphilus carolinensis Smith, 1969
- Prociphilus caryae (Fitch, 1856)
- Prociphilus chaenomelis
- Prociphilus cheni Tao, 1970
- Prociphilus clerodendri Okamoto & Takahashi, 1927
- Prociphilus cornifoliae Singh, Das & Raychaudhuri, 1977
- Prociphilus corrugatans (Sirrine, 1894)
- Prociphilus crataegicola Shinji, 1922
- Prociphilus crataegistrobi (Smith, 1969)
- Prociphilus dilonicerae Zhang, 1981
- Prociphilus emeiensis Zhang, 1997
- Prociphilus erigeronensis (Thomas, 1879)
- Prociphilus formosanus Takahashi, 1935
- Prociphilus fraxini (Fabricius, 1777)
- Prociphilus fraxinifolii (Riley, 1879)
- Prociphilus gambosae Zhang & Zhang, 1993
- Prociphilus ghanii Hille Ris Lambers, 1973
- Prociphilus himalayaensis Chakrabarti, 1976
- Prociphilus konoi Hori, 1938
- Prociphilus kuwanai Monzen, 1927
- Prociphilus laricis Shinji, 1941
- Prociphilus ligustrifoliae (Tseng & Tao, 1938)
- Prociphilus longianus Smith, 1974
- Prociphilus lonicerae Shinji, 1943
- Prociphilus mexicanus Remaudière & Muñoz Viveros, 1985
- Prociphilus micheliae Hille Ris Lambers, 1933
- Prociphilus oleae (Leach, 1826)
- Prociphilus oriens Mordvilko, 1935
- Prociphilus osmanthae Essig & Kuwana, 1918
- Prociphilus pergandei Smith, 1974
- Prociphilus piceaerubensis (Smith, 1969)
- Prociphilus pini (Burmeister, 1835)
- Prociphilus piniradicivorus Smith, 1969
- Prociphilus probosceus Sanborn, 1904
- Prociphilus sasakii Monzen, 1927
- Prociphilus take (Shinji, 1922)
- Prociphilus taukogi
- Prociphilus taxus (Ghosh, Chakrabarti, Chowdhuri & Raychaudhuri, 1969)
- Prociphilus tessellatus (Fitch, 1851) (woolly alder aphid)
- Prociphilus trinus Zhang, 1997
- Prociphilus umarovi
- Prociphilus ushikoroshi Shinji, 1924
- Prociphilus vesicalis (Rudow, 1875)
- Prociphilus xylostei (De Geer, 1773)
