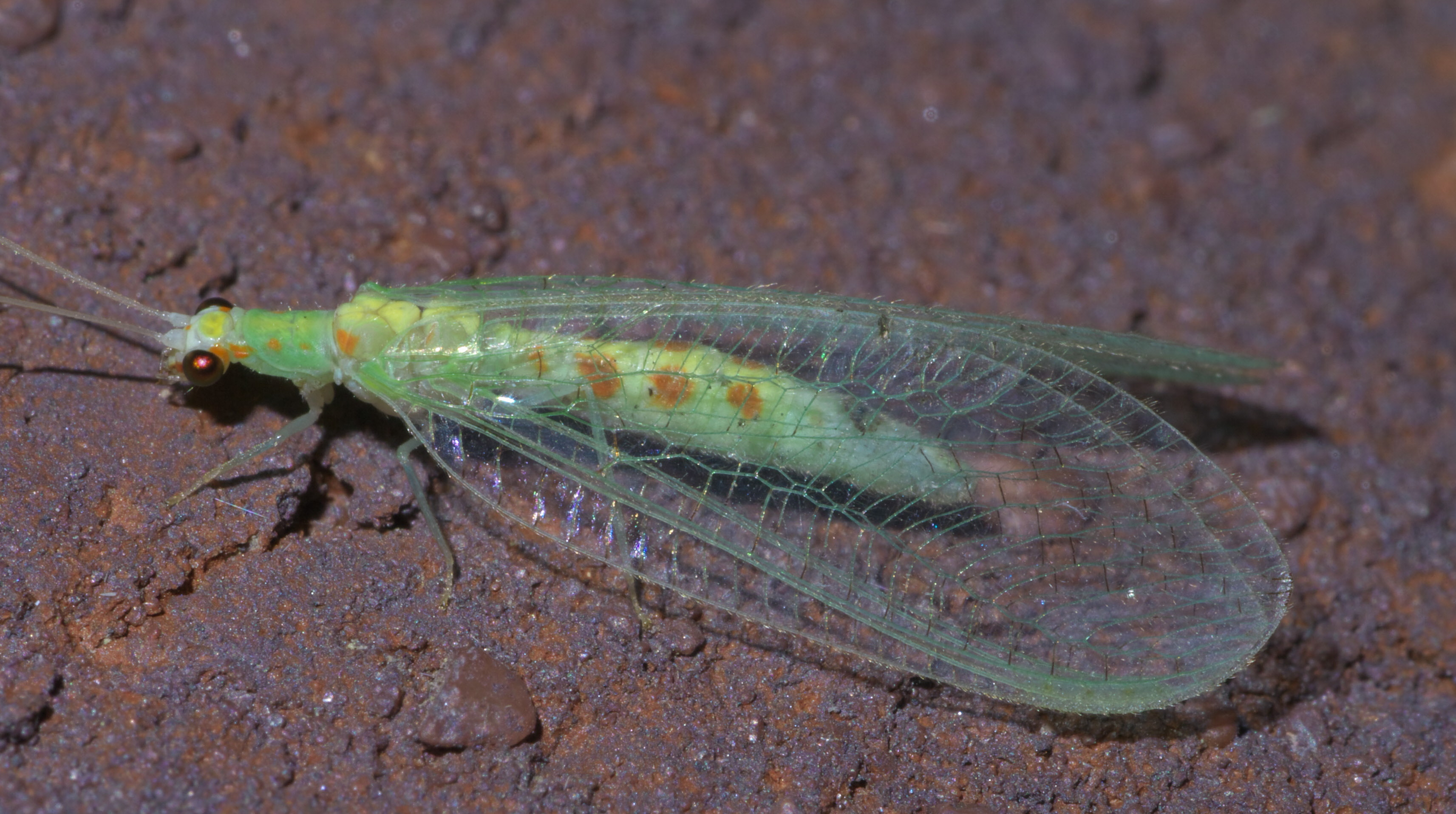

Scientific classification
- Kingdom: Animalia
- Phylum: Arthropoda
- Class: Insecta
- Order: Neuroptera
- Family: Chrysopidae
- Tribe: Chrysopini
- Genus: Chrysopa
- Species: C. quadripunctata

Binomial name
- Chrysopa quadripunctata Burmeister, 1839

= Chrysopa quadripunctata =

Species of lacewing

Chrysopa quadripunctata is a species of green lacewing in the family Chrysopidae. It is found in North America.

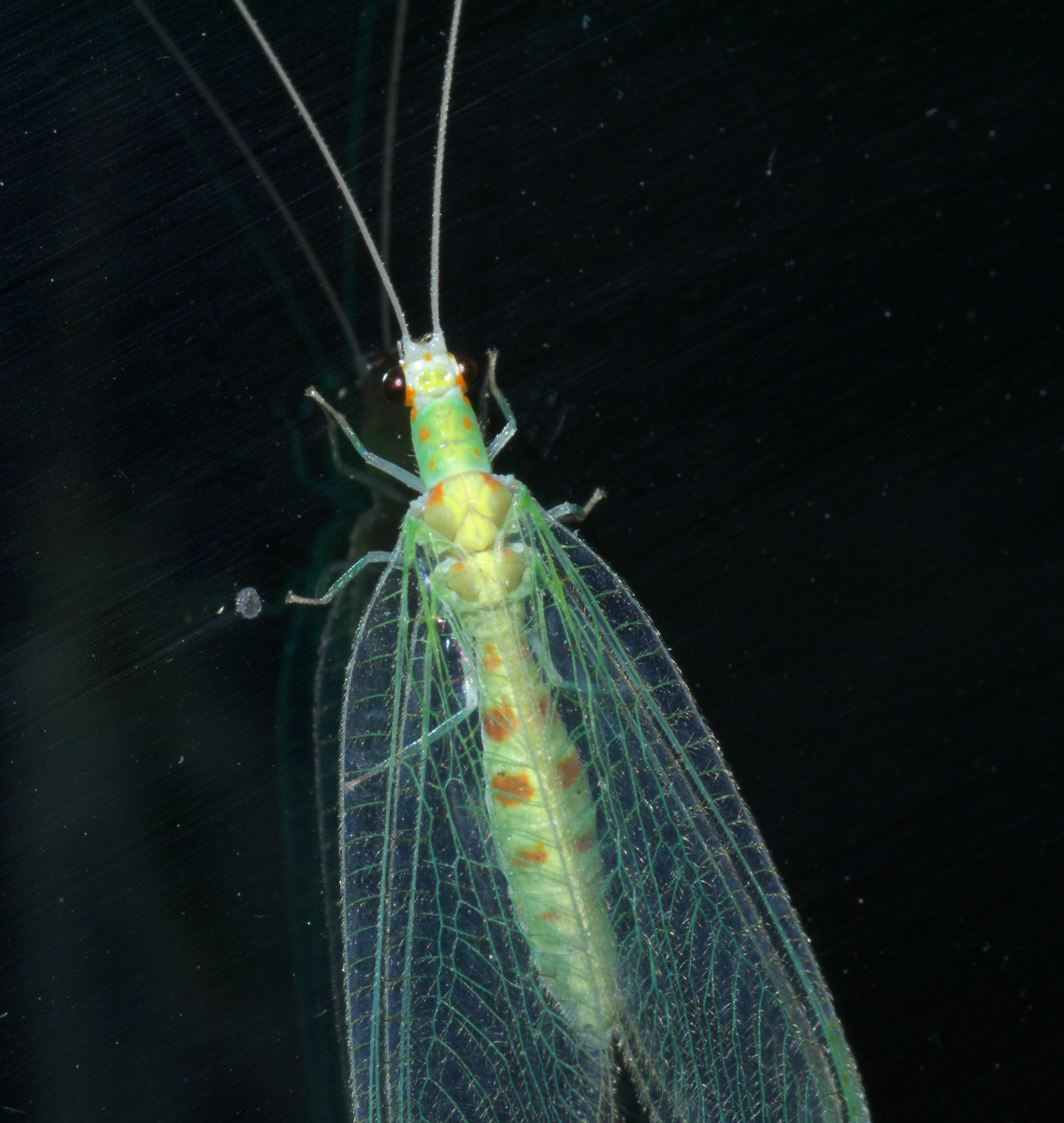
