= Forda formicaria =

Scientific classification
- Kingdom: Animalia
- Phylum: Arthropoda
- Class: Insecta
- Order: Hemiptera
- Suborder: Sternorrhyncha
- Family: Aphididae
- Genus: Forda
- Species: F. formicaria

Binomial name
- Forda formicaria von Heyden, 1837

Species of aphid

Forda formicaria is a species of aphid. It is a pest of millets. It has been recorded on barnyard grass, Elymus sp., Hordeum spp., Setaria spp., wheat, and oats in the United States.
