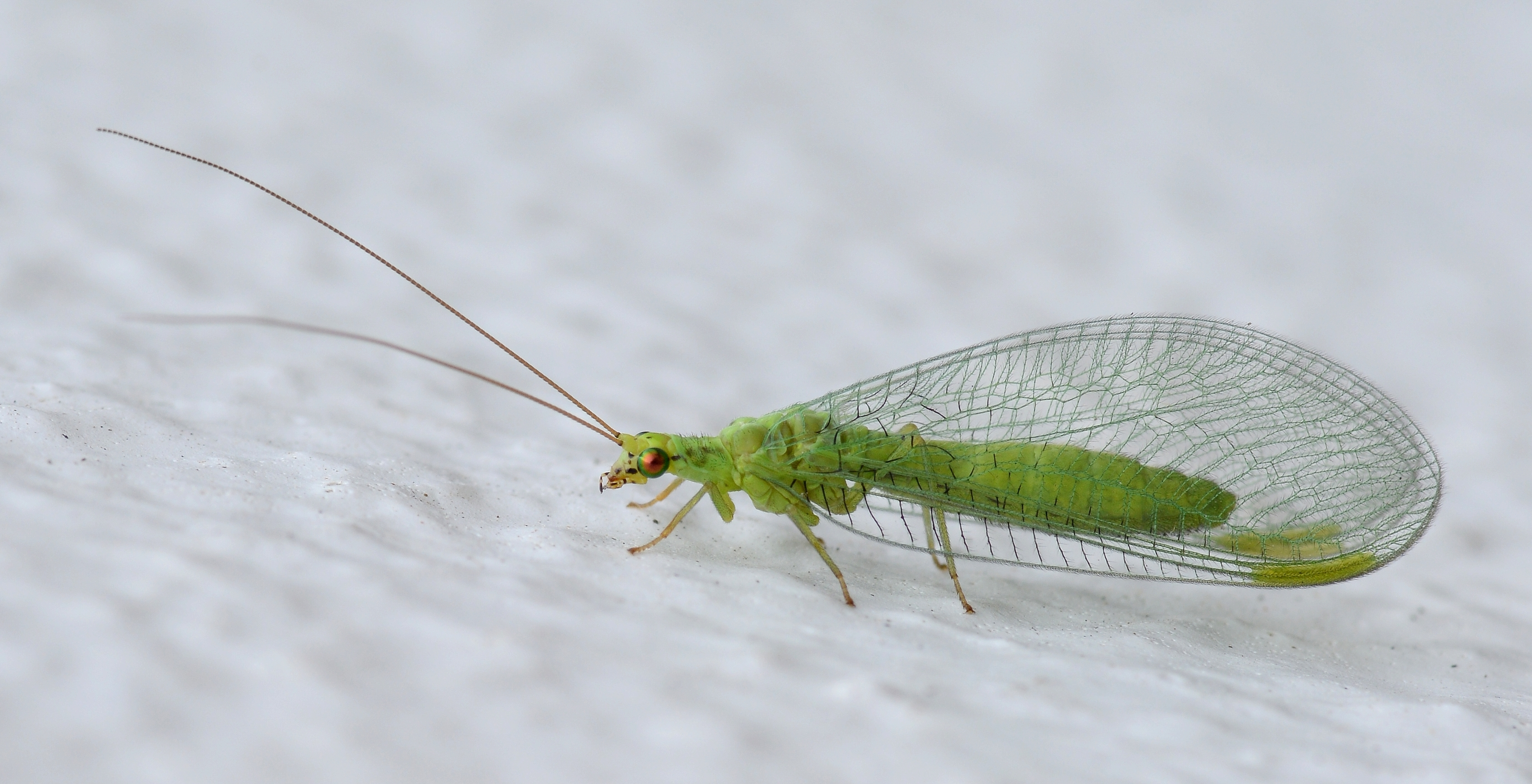
- Chrysopa sp.

Scientific classification
- Kingdom: Animalia
- Phylum: Arthropoda
- Clade: Pancrustacea
- Class: Insecta
- Order: Neuroptera
- Family: Chrysopidae
- Subfamily: Chrysopinae
- Tribe: Chrysopini
- Genus: Chrysopa; Leach in Brewster, 1815

Species
- See text

Synonyms
- Odontochrysa Yang & Yang, 1991

= Chrysopa =

Genus of insects

Chrysopa is a genus of green lacewings in the neuropteran family Chrysopidae.

Members of this genus and the genus Chrysoperla are common in much of North America, Europe and Asia. They share similar characteristics and some species have been moved from one genus to the other and back again. Their larvae are predatory and feed on aphids and members of this genus have been used in biological pest control.

William Elford Leach first described this genus in 1815 in Brewster's Edinburgh Encyclopædia. Albert Koebele introduced species of Chrysopa to New Zealand in the 1890s, as a method to combat aphids, however no Chrysopa species were able to establish.

== Species ==
- Chrysopa abbreviata
- Chrysopa chi Fitch, 1855
- Chrysopa coloradensis Banks, 1895
- Chrysopa dorsalis
- Chrysopa excepta Banks, 1911
- Chrysopa formosa
- Chrysopa incompleta Banks, 1911
- Chrysopa intima
- Chrysopa lezeyi
- Chrysopa nigra
- Chrysopa nigricornis Burmeister, 1839
- Chrysopa oculata Say, 1839
- Chrysopa pallens
- Chrysopa perla
- Chrysopa pleuralis Banks, 1911
- Chrysopa quadripunctata Burmeister, 1839
- Chrysopa slossonae Banks, 1924
- Chrysopa viridana
