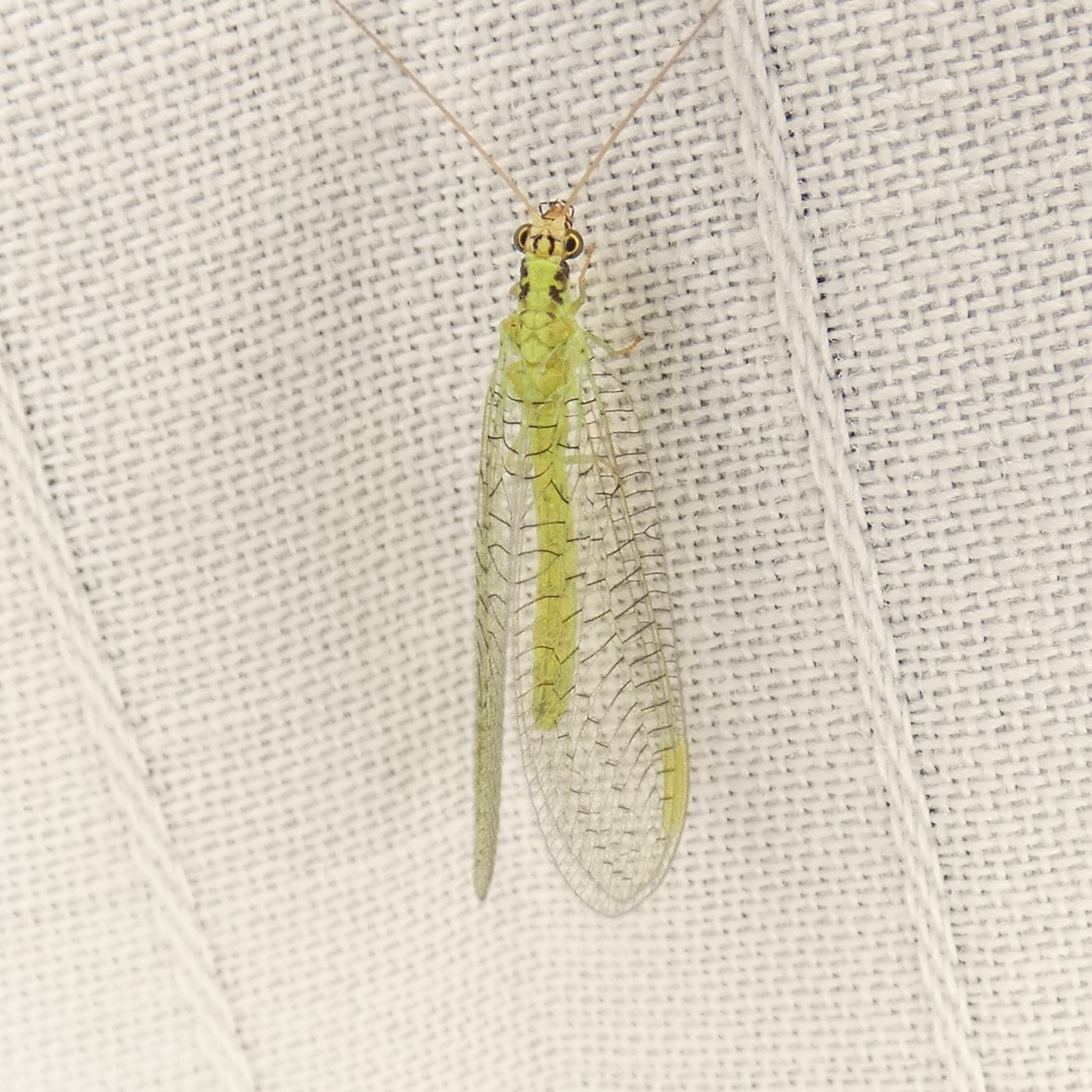

Scientific classification
- Domain: Eukaryota
- Kingdom: Animalia
- Phylum: Arthropoda
- Class: Insecta
- Order: Neuroptera
- Family: Chrysopidae
- Tribe: Chrysopini
- Genus: Chrysopa
- Species: C. incompleta

Binomial name
- Chrysopa incompleta Banks, 1911

= Chrysopa incompleta =

Species of lacewing

Chrysopa incompleta is a species of green lacewing. It is found in the eastern United States.
