= Forda hirsuta =

Scientific classification
- Kingdom: Animalia
- Phylum: Arthropoda
- Class: Insecta
- Order: Hemiptera
- Suborder: Sternorrhyncha
- Family: Aphididae
- Genus: Forda
- Species: F. hirsuta

Binomial name
- Forda hirsuta Mordvilko, 1935

Species of aphid

Forda hirsuta is a species of aphid. It is a pest of millets.
