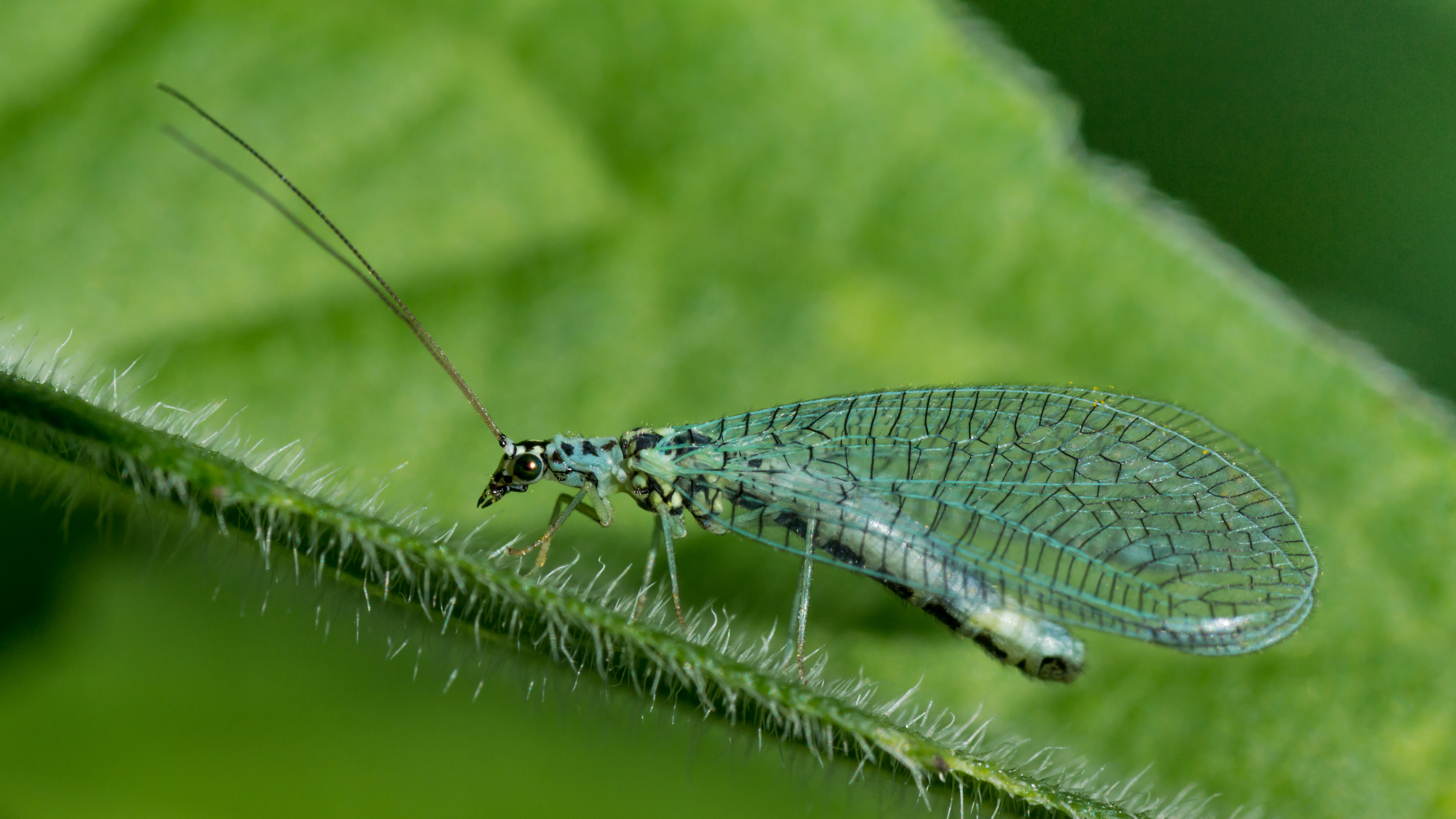
- Near Havelsee, Germany

Scientific classification
- Kingdom: Animalia
- Phylum: Arthropoda
- Class: Insecta
- Order: Neuroptera
- Family: Chrysopidae
- Genus: Chrysopa
- Species: C. perla

Binomial name
- Chrysopa perla (Linnaeus, 1758)

Synonyms
- List: Aeolops perla (Linnaeus, 1758); Aeolops viridis (Retzius, 1783); Chrysopa cancellata (Schrank, 1802); Chrysopa chrysops (Linnaeus, 1758); Chrysopa divisa Navás, 1910; Chrysopa elongata Lacroix, 1916; Chrysopa fallax Navás, 1914; Chrysopa nigrodorsalis Pongrácz, 1912; Chrysopa nothochrysiformis Lacroix, 1915; Chrysopa reticulata Curtis, 1834; Cintameva nothochrysodes Navás, 1936; Cintameva perla (Linnaeus, 1758) Emerobius chrysops (Linnaeus, 1758); Hemerobius cancellatus Schrank, 1802; Hemerobius chrysops Linnaeus, 1758; Hemerobius perla Linnaeus, 1758 Hemerobius reticulatus (Leach in Brewster, 1815); Hemerobius viridis Retzius, 1783; Osmylus chrysops (Linnaeus, 1758)

= Chrysopa perla =

Species of lacewing

Chrysopa perla, the Pearly Green Lacewing, is an insect species belonging to the green lacewing family, Chrysopidae (subfamily Chrysopinae).

== Distribution ==
This widespread species is present in most of Europe and in temperate zones of Asia.

== Habitat ==
These insects prefer cool and shady areas, mainly in deciduous woods, wet forests, woodland edges, hedge rows, scrubby grassland and shrubs.

== Description ==
The adults reach 10–12 millimetres (0.39–0.47 in) of length, with a wingspan of 25–30 millimetres (0.98–1.18 in). The basic coloration of the body is green. Wings are blue-green with black veins. They turn pale yellow during the winter. Several black markings are present on the head, the thorax and below the abdomen. The second antennal segment is black. This species is rather similar to Chrysopa dorsalis, showing an oval pale spot between the eyes, which is roundish in C. perla.

== Biology ==
Adults can be encountered from May through August. They are fearsome predators, primarily feeding on aphids, occasionally on flower nectar.

The females usually lay eggs near aphid colonies. Larvae are predators, mainly feeding on Aphididae, Coccidae species and caterpillars (Pieris brassicae, Autographa gamma). The adult insects hibernate in winter.

== Gallery ==
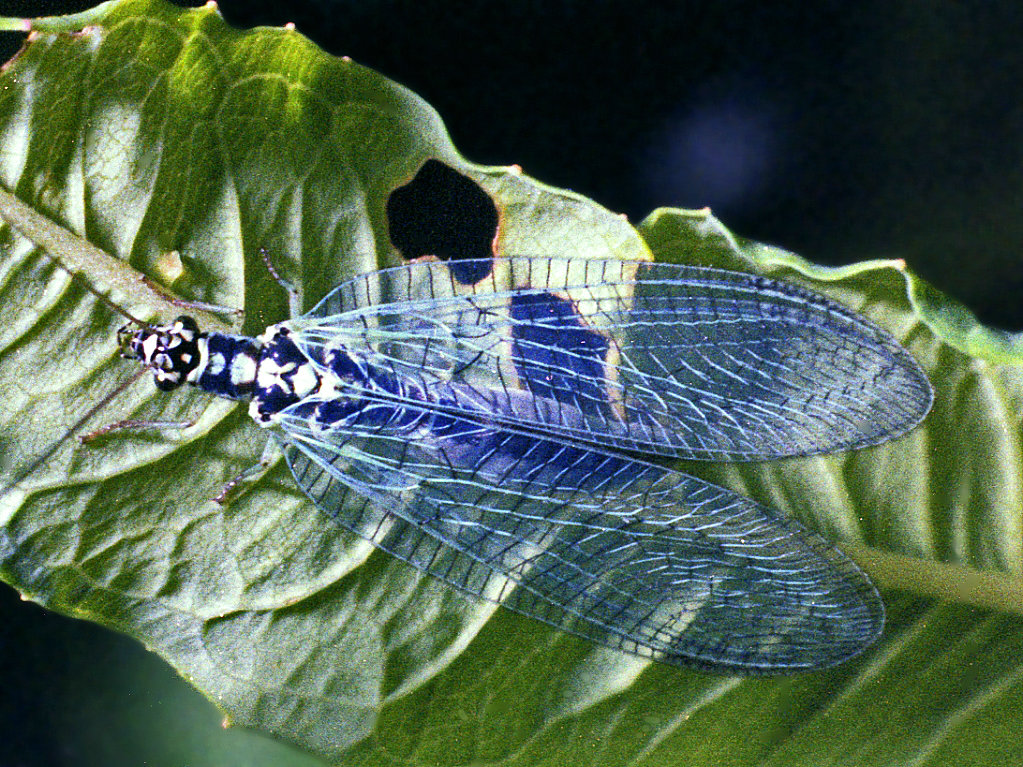
Dorsal view

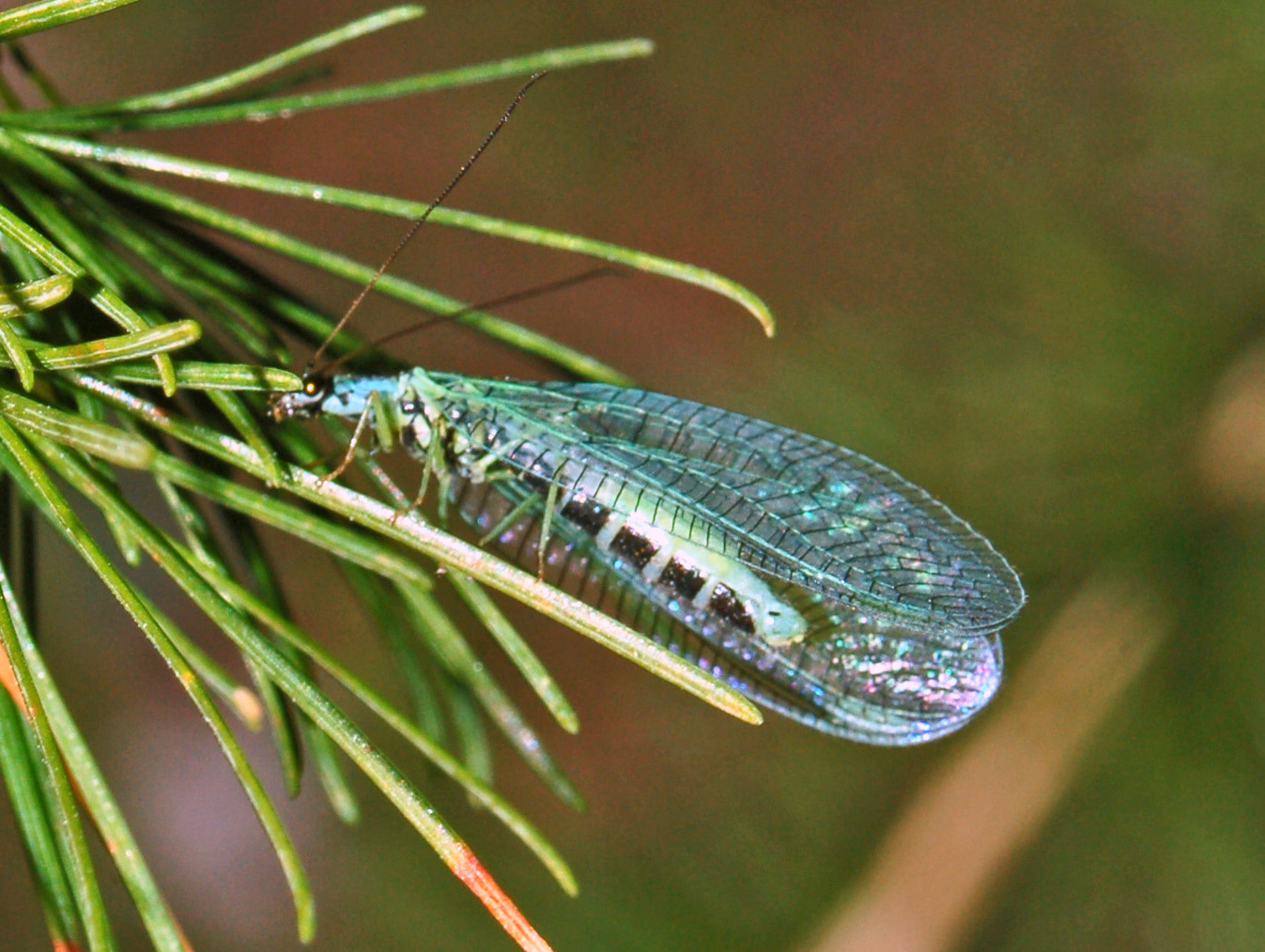
Female. Side view

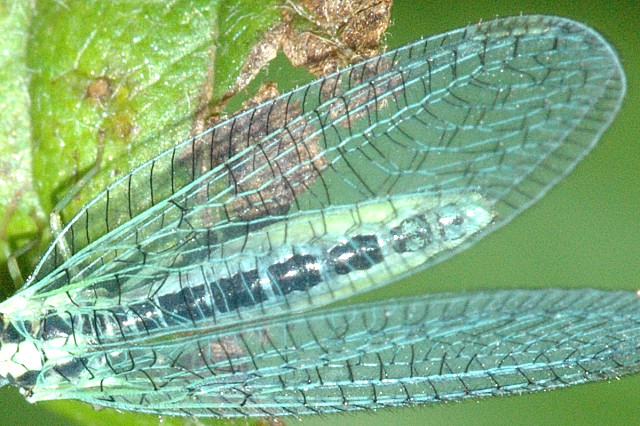
Wing detail

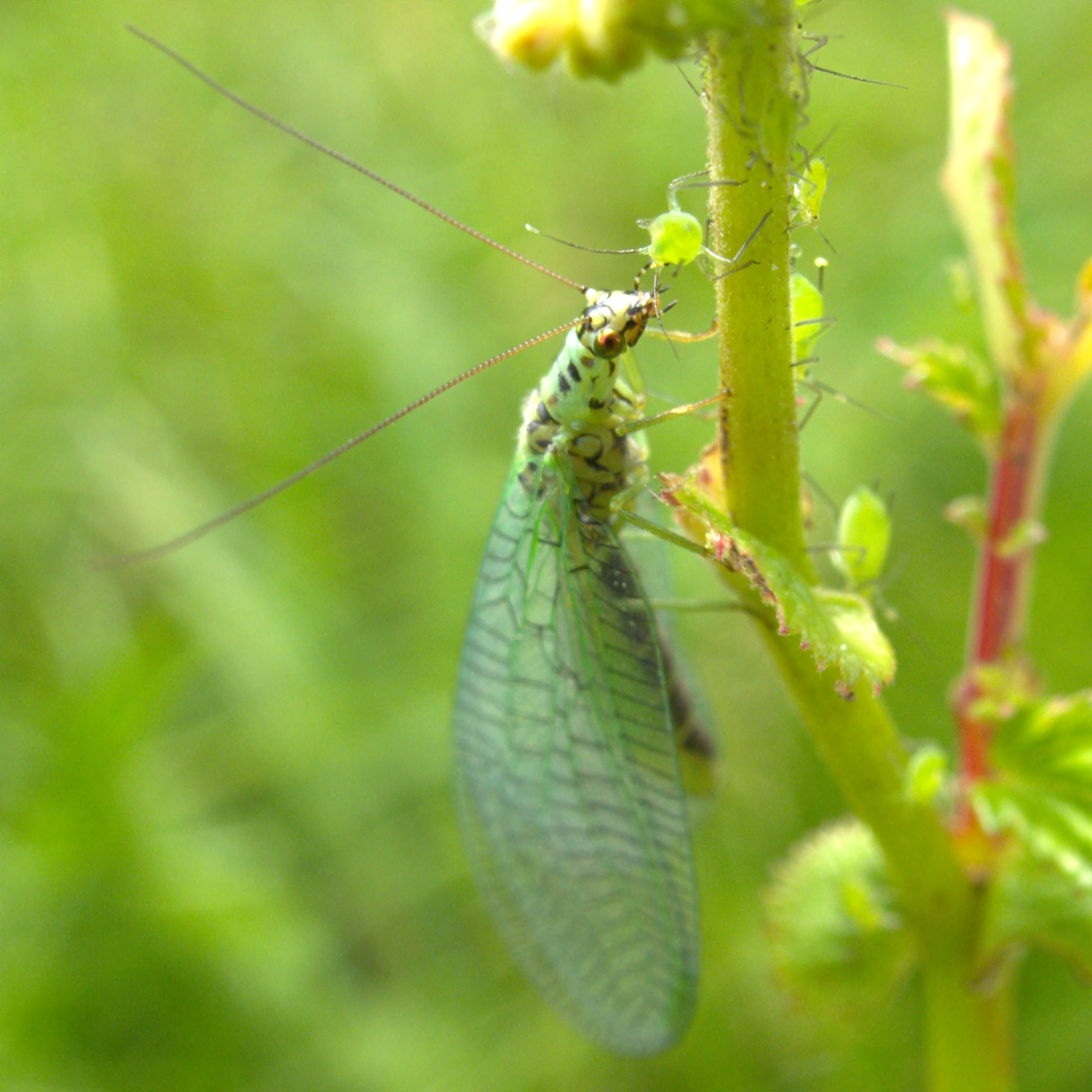
Eating aphids

Video clip
