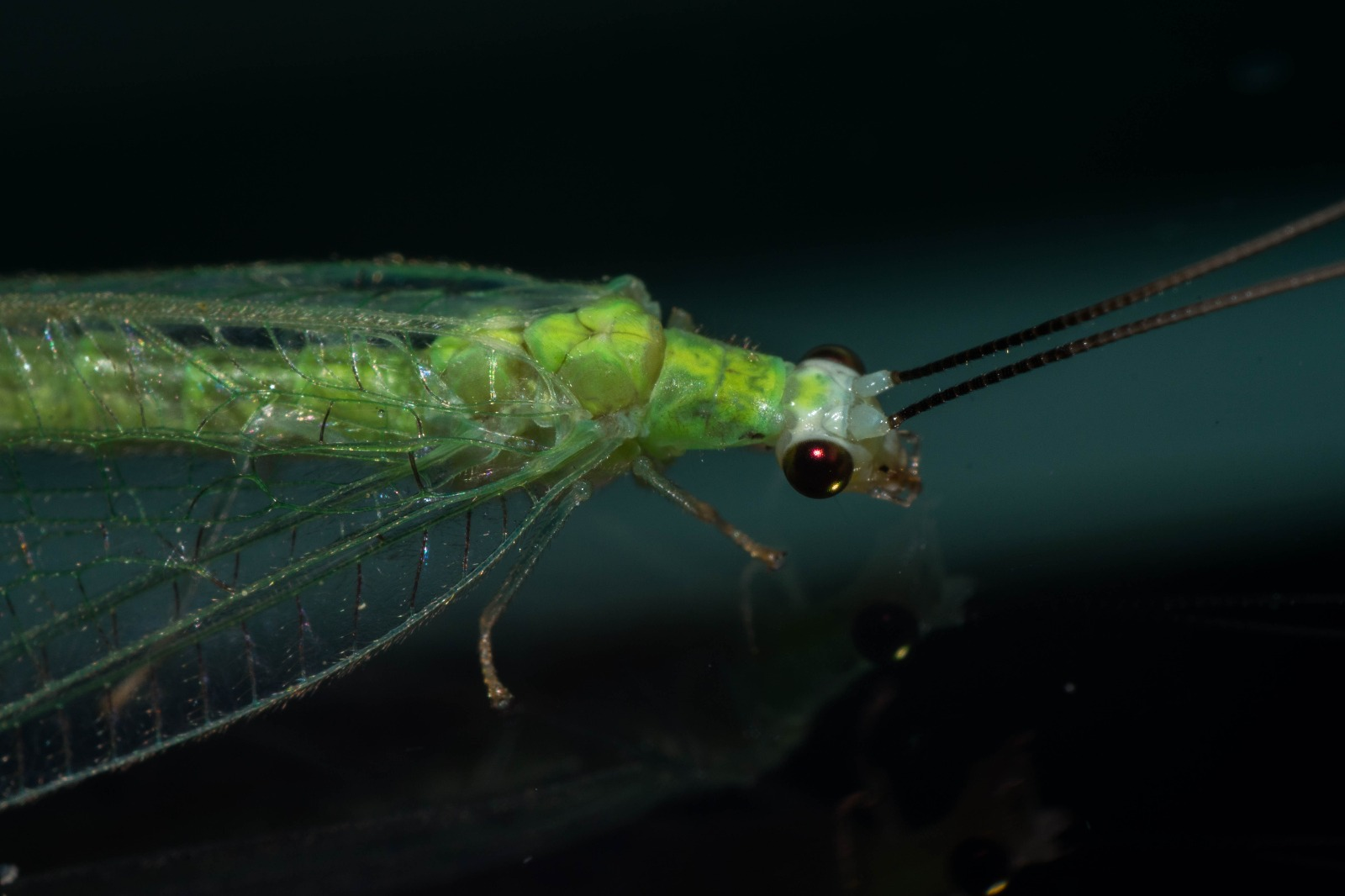

Scientific classification
- Kingdom: Animalia
- Phylum: Arthropoda
- Class: Insecta
- Order: Neuroptera
- Family: Chrysopidae
- Genus: Chrysopa
- Species: C. nigricornis

Binomial name
- Chrysopa nigricornis Burmeister, 1839

= Chrysopa nigricornis =

Species of lacewing

Chrysopa nigricornis is a species of green lacewing in the family Chrysopidae. It is found in Central America and North America.
