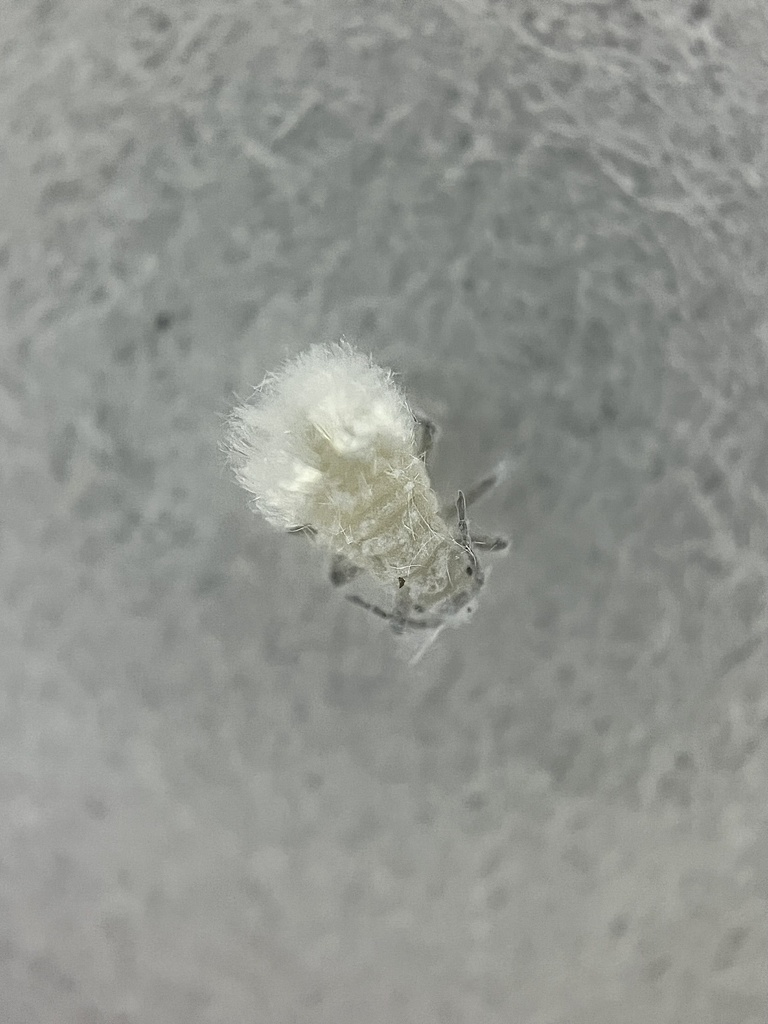

Scientific classification
- Kingdom: Animalia
- Phylum: Arthropoda
- Class: Insecta
- Order: Hemiptera
- Suborder: Sternorrhyncha
- Family: Aphididae
- Genus: Thecabius
- Species: T. affinis

Binomial name
- Thecabius affinis Kaltenbach, 1843

= Thecabius affinis =

Species of aphid

Thecabius affinis, commonly known as the buttercup-poplar gall aphid, is a gall-making aphid in the genus Thecabius found in the United States and Europe.

== Host plants ==
This species creates galls on buttercups and poplar trees across its range.

== Description ==
The aphid is fuzzy and white colored in pre adults, and adults are generically bluish. The main destinguisher for this aphid is the host plant. This is the only aphid of this species' appearance that uses the bottom of buttercups (in North America) and poplar species, where they congregate.

== Pest ==
This species causes major leaf damage to poplar trees across its range, especially in the United Kingdom and surrounding countries.
