= Ceratopemphigus =

Scientific classification
- Kingdom: Animalia
- Phylum: Arthropoda
- Clade: Pancrustacea
- Class: Insecta
- Order: Hemiptera
- Suborder: Sternorrhyncha
- Family: Aphididae
- Genus: Ceratopemphigus; Schouteden, 1905
- Species: C. zehntneri

Binomial name
- Ceratopemphigus zehntneri Schouteden, 1905

Ceratopemphigus zehntneri is an aphid in the order Hemiptera. It is a true bug and sucks sap from plants. It is the only species in the genus Ceratopemphigus. It is known to form galls on Ligustrum robustum. It is one of two endemic aphids of Sri Lanka.
