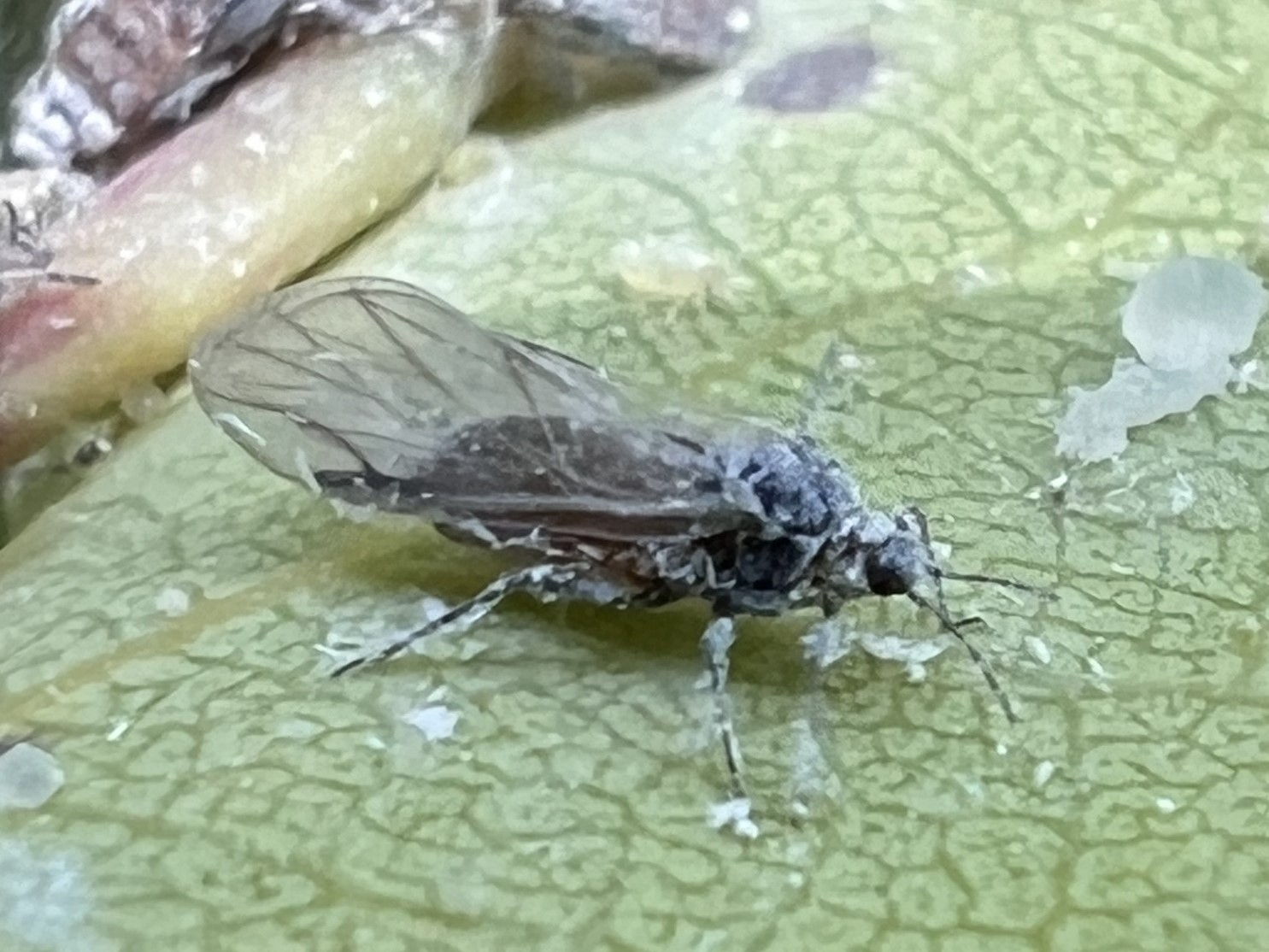

Scientific classification
- Kingdom: Animalia
- Phylum: Arthropoda
- Clade: Pancrustacea
- Class: Insecta
- Order: Hemiptera
- Suborder: Sternorrhyncha
- Family: Aphididae
- Genus: Pachypappa; Koch, 1856

= Pachypappa =

Genus of true bugs

Pachypappa is a genus of aphids in the family Aphididae.

The species of this genus are found in Europe and North America.

== Species ==
The following species are recognised in the genus Pachypappa:

- Pachypappa aigeros Zhang, 1997
- Pachypappa marsupialis Koch, 1856
- Pachypappa myrtilli Börner, 1950
- Pachypappa pilosa (Zhang, 1981)
- Pachypappa populi (Linnaeus, 1758)
- Pachypappa pseudobyrsa (Walsh, 1863)
- Pachypappa rosettei (Maxson, 1934)
- Pachypappa sacculi (Gillette, 1914)
- Pachypappa shaposhnikovi
- Pachypappa tortuasae Zhang, 1997
- Pachypappa tremulae (Linnaeus, 1761)
- Pachypappa vesicalis Koch, 1856
- Pachypappa warshavensis (Nasonov, 1894)
- BOLD:AAB6203 (Pachypappa sp.)
- BOLD:ACD2319 (Pachypappa sp.)
- BOLD:ACJ9208 (Pachypappa sp.)
- BOLD:ACN8097 (Pachypappa sp.)
- BOLD:ACR1460 (Pachypappa sp.)
