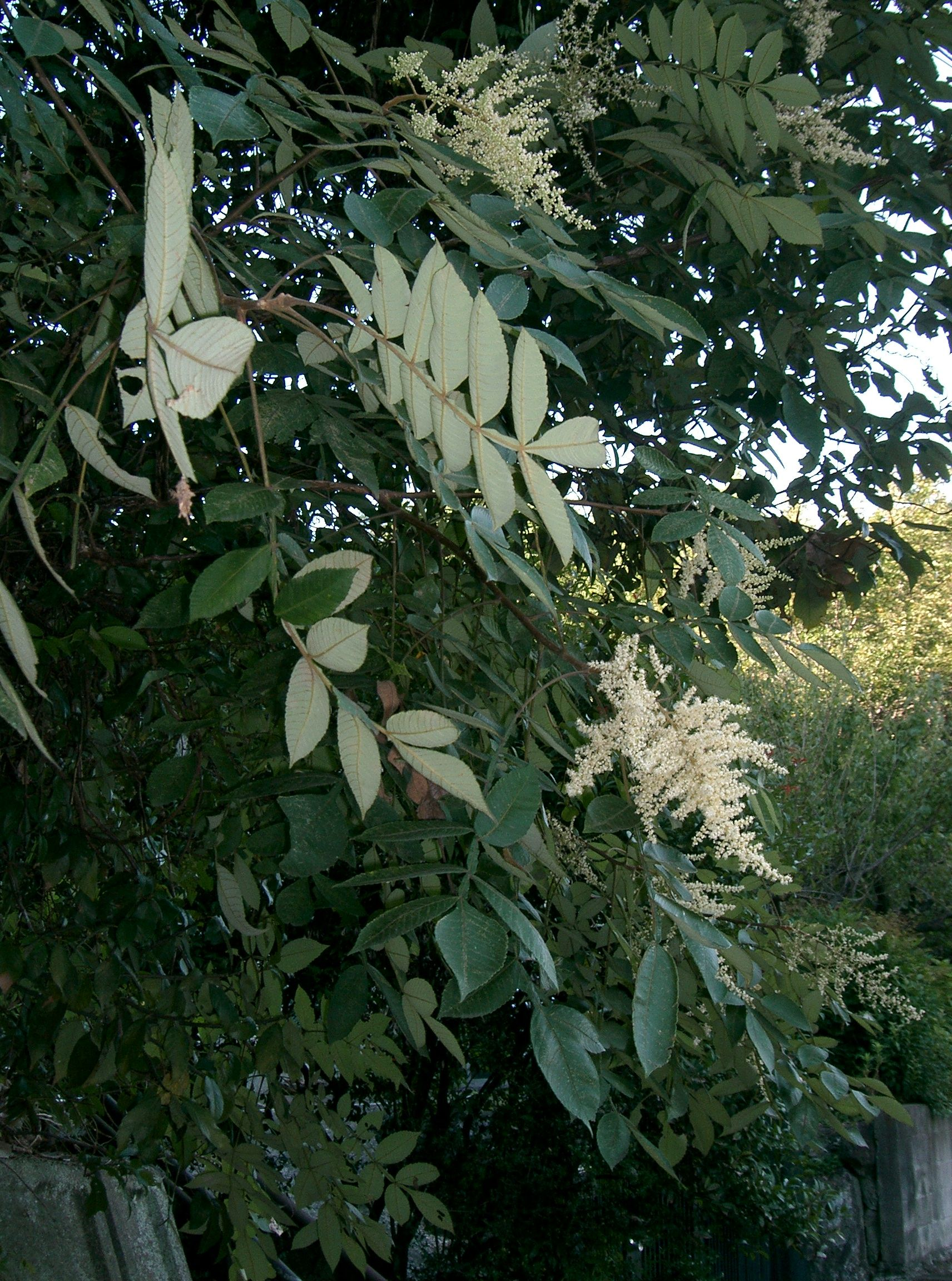

Conservation status
- Least Concern (IUCN 3.1)

Scientific classification
- Kingdom: Plantae
- Clade: Tracheophytes
- Clade: Angiosperms
- Clade: Eudicots
- Clade: Rosids
- Order: Sapindales
- Family: Anacardiaceae
- Genus: Rhus
- Species: R. chinensis

Binomial name
- Rhus chinensis Mill.

Synonyms
- Rhus javanica auct.; Rhus semialata Murray

= Rhus chinensis =

Chinese sumac

Species of tree

Rhus chinensis, the Chinese sumac or nutgall tree, is a deciduous shrub or small tree in the genus Rhus. Growing to 6 m (20 ft) tall, it has downy shoots and leaves comprising several leaflets. These turn red in autumn before falling.

The plant is common in East and South Asia, and is cultivated as an ornamental in temperate climates.

Galls produced on the species that are called Chinese gall (Galla chinensis), are a source of gallotannins, molecules of hydrolyzable tannins. Infestation of the tree by Chinese sumac aphids (Melaphis chinensis Bell) may lead to production of a gall that is valued as a commercial product in China.

Chinese galls are used in traditional Chinese medicine for coughs, diarrhea, night sweats, dysentery, and intestinal and uterine bleeding. Some research has suggested that chemical compounds found in Rhus chinensis possess in vitro antiviral, antibacterial, anticancer, hepatoprotective, antidiarrheal, and antioxidant activities. The aqueous extracts of the gall also inhibit alpha-glucosidase activity in vitro.

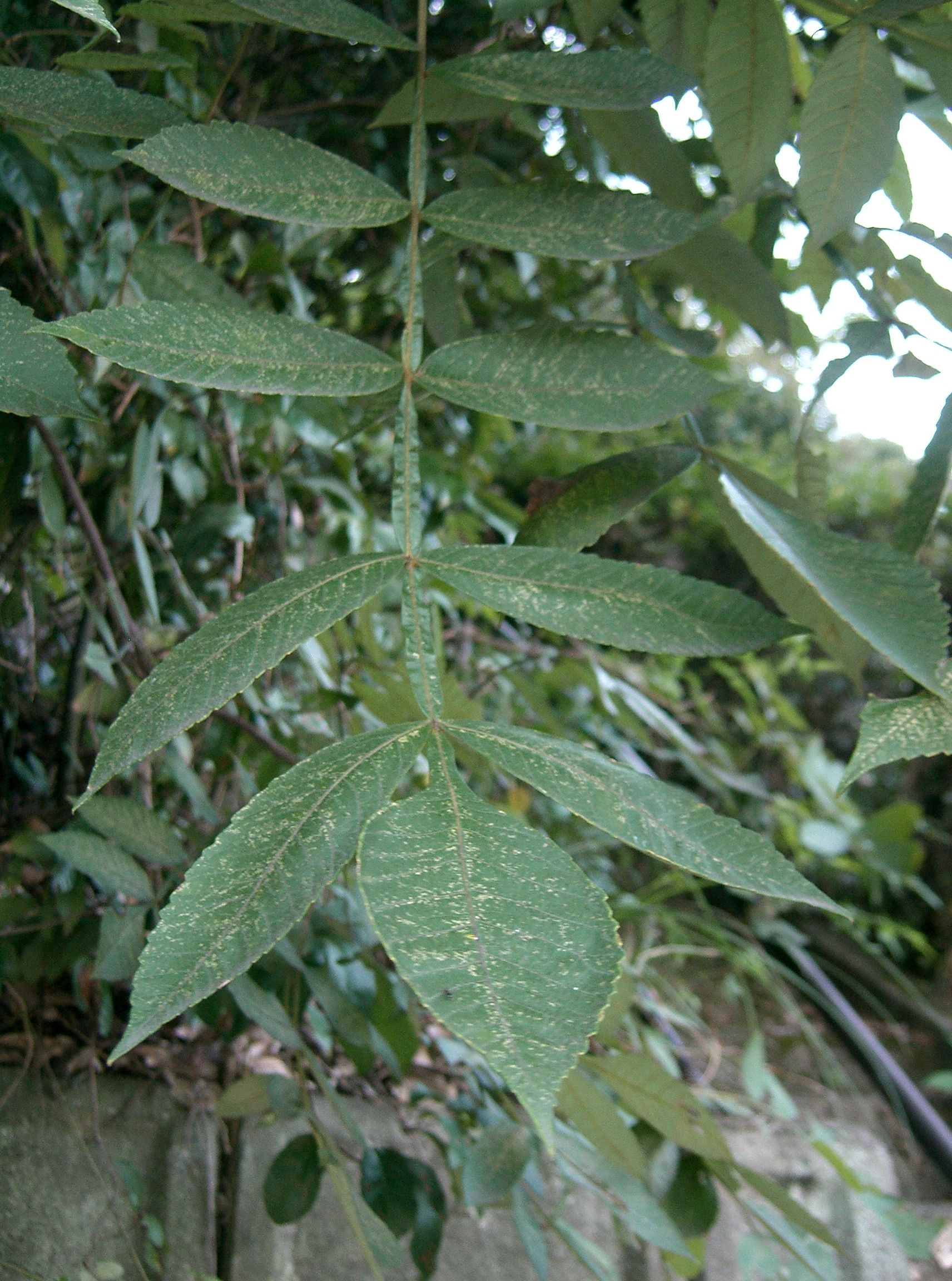
Foliage

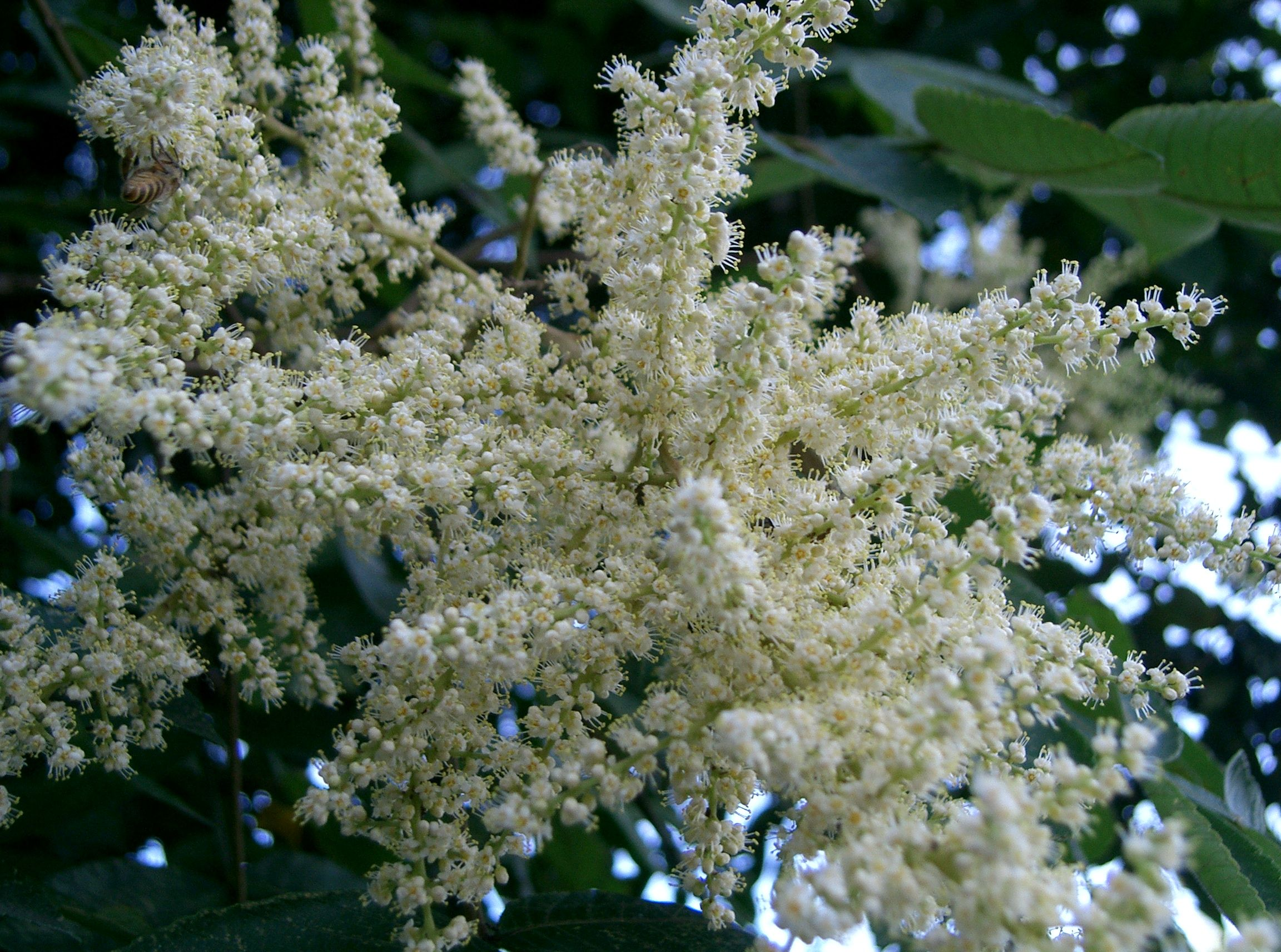
Flowers

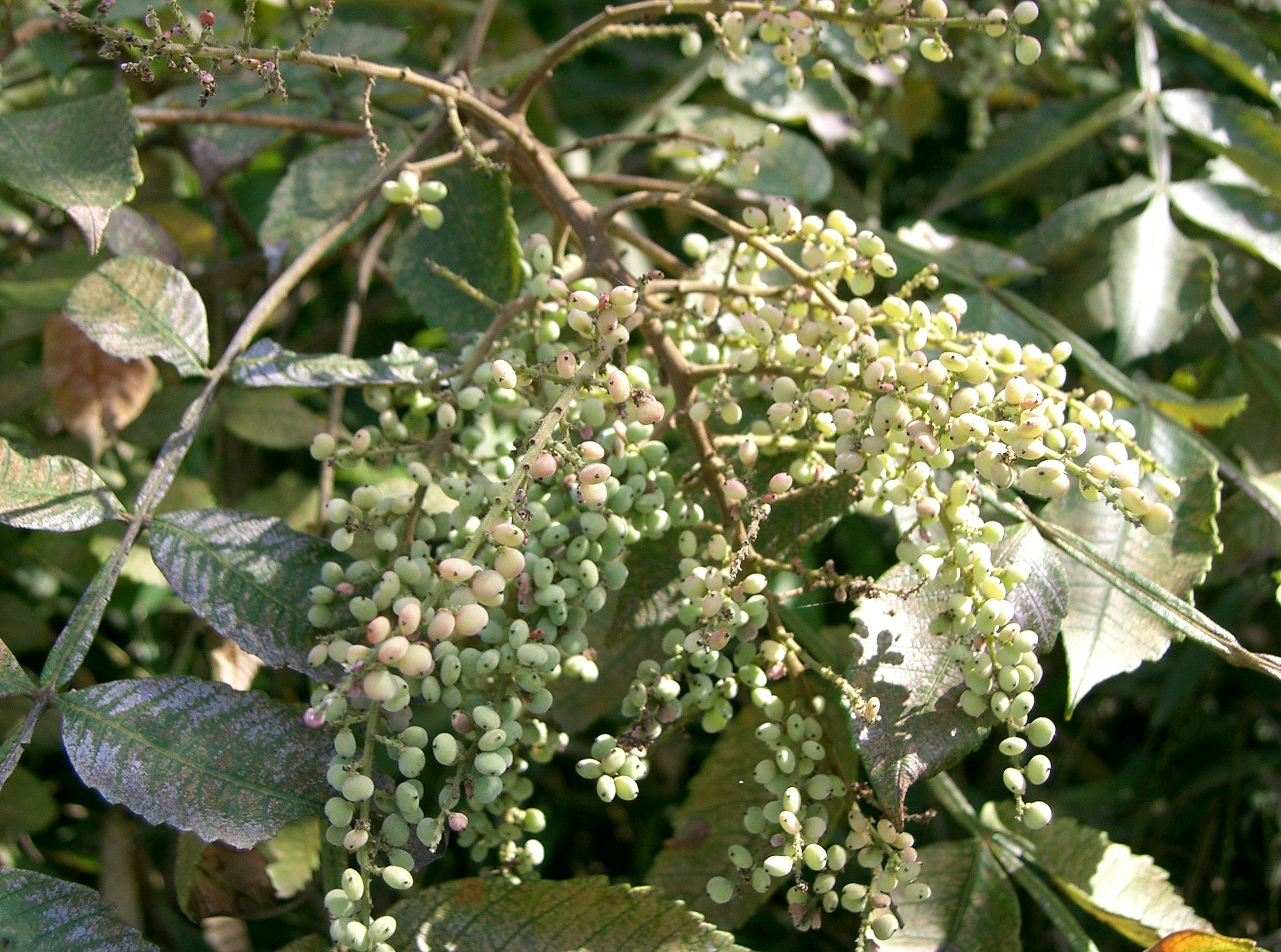
Fruits

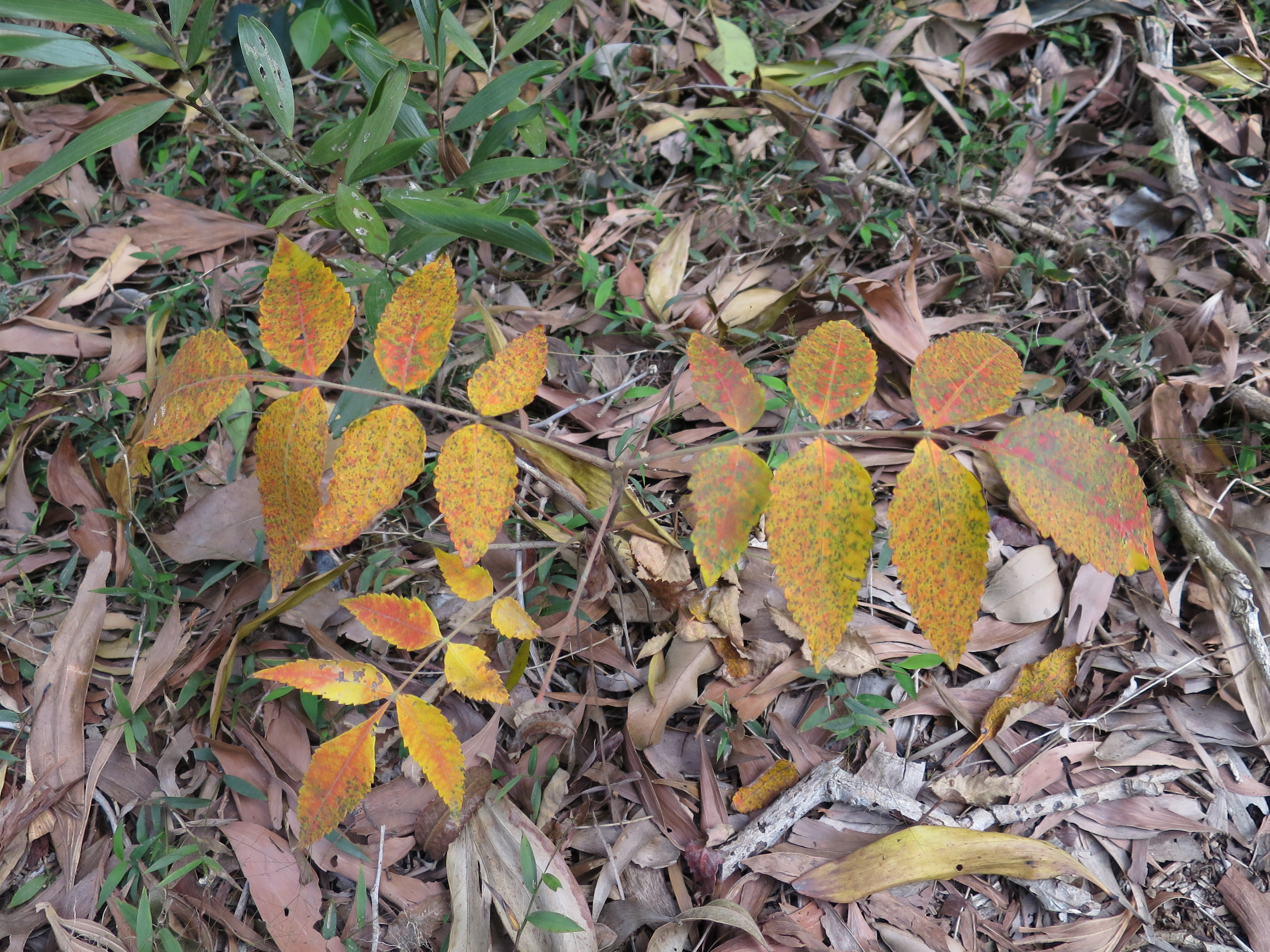
Sapling
