= Grylloprociphilus =

Scientific classification
- Domain: Eukaryota
- Kingdom: Animalia
- Phylum: Arthropoda
- Class: Insecta
- Order: Hemiptera
- Suborder: Sternorrhyncha
- Family: Aphididae
- Subfamily: Eriosomatinae
- Tribe: Pemphigini
- Genus: Grylloprociphilus; Smith & Pepper, 1968

Genus of true bugs

Grylloprociphilus is a genus of woolly and gall-making aphids in the family Aphididae. There is at least one described species in Grylloprociphilus, G. imbricator. G. imbricator feeds on American beech.
