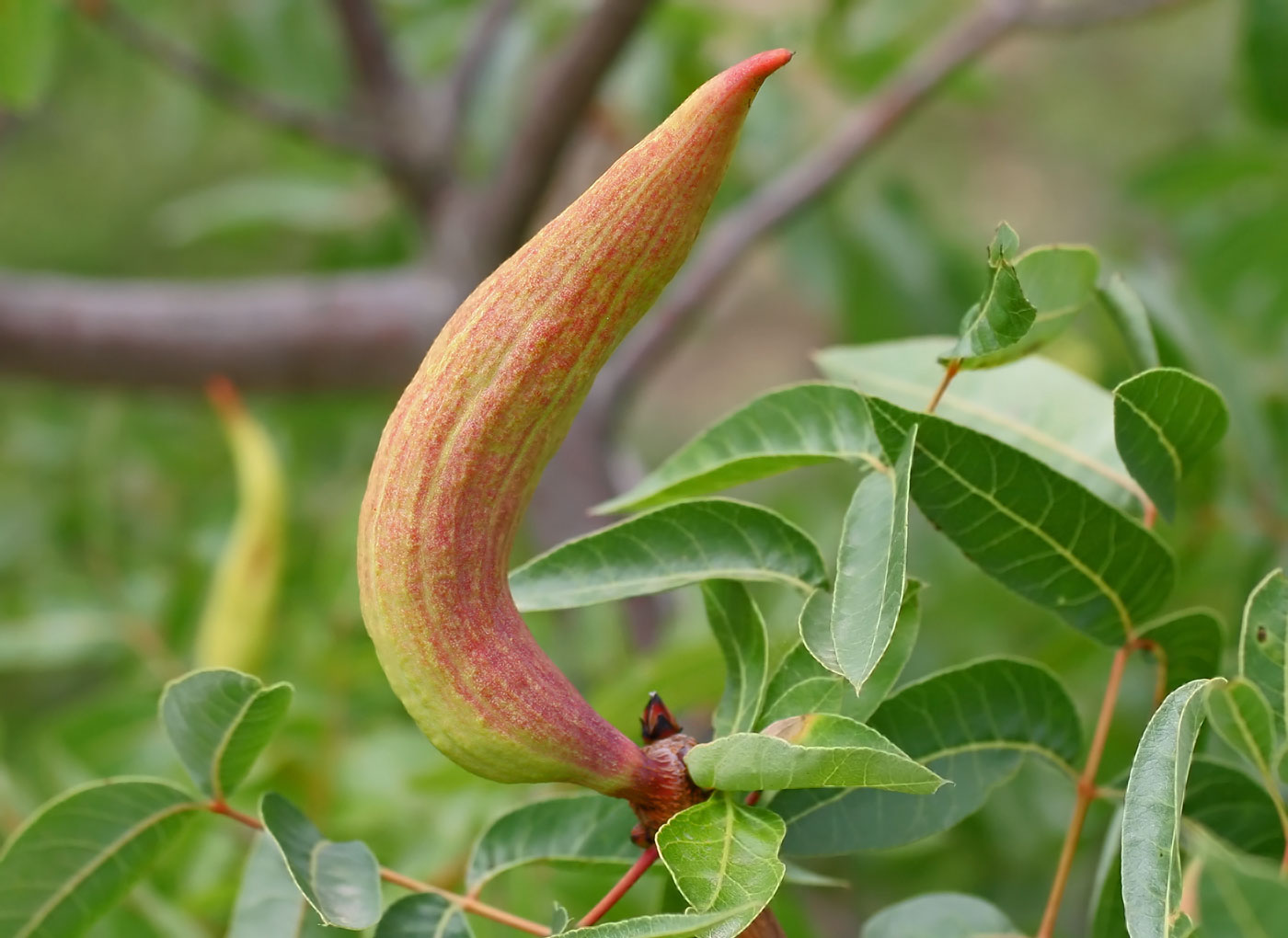

Scientific classification
- Kingdom: Animalia
- Phylum: Arthropoda
- Class: Insecta
- Order: Hemiptera
- Suborder: Sternorrhyncha
- Family: Aphididae
- Genus: Baizongia; Rondani, 1848

= Baizongia =

Genus of insects

Baizongia is a genus of true bugs belonging to the family Aphididae.

The species of this genus are found in Eurasia.

Species:

- Baizongia pistaciae (Linnaeus, 1767)
