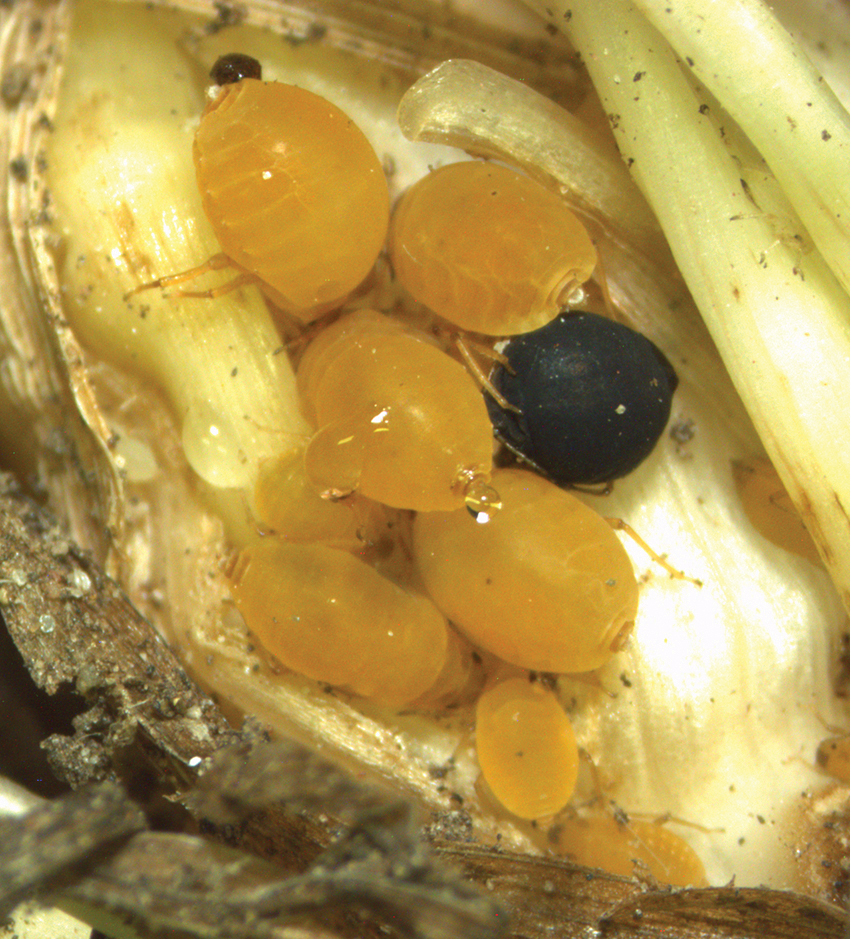

Scientific classification
- Domain: Eukaryota
- Kingdom: Animalia
- Phylum: Arthropoda
- Class: Insecta
- Order: Hemiptera
- Suborder: Sternorrhyncha
- Family: Aphididae
- Subfamily: Eriosomatinae
- Tribe: Fordini
- Genus: Forda; Heyden, 1837

Synonyms
- List: Namaforda Zhang, 1997; Pentaphis de Horváth, 1896; Penthaphis Williams & Ben-Dov, 2009; Penthaphis de Horváth, 1896; Rhizoterus Hartig, 1841; Torda von Heyden, 1837

= Forda =

Genus of true bugs

Forda is a genus of aphids belonging to the family Aphididae. The genus was first described by Carl von Heyden in 1837. The species of this genus are found in Eurasia and North America.

== Species ==
The following species are recognised in the genus Forda:

- Forda auralenta Zhang & Qiao, 1998
- Forda formicaria von Heyden, 1837
- Forda hirsuta
- Forda hirsutissima Remaudière, 1999
- Forda kaussarii Davatchi & Remaudière, 1957
- Forda longicornis Remaudière & Leclant, 1999
- Forda marginata Koch, 1857
- Forda multicoma Zhang, 1998
- Forda orientalis George, 1928
- Forda pawlowae (Mordvilko, 1900)
- Forda riccobonii (De Stefani, 1899)
- Forda rotunda Theobald, 1914
- Forda sichangensis Remaudière & Tao, 1957
- BOLD:AAG3895 (Forda sp.)
- BOLD:ACP3887 (Forda sp.)
