= Chinensis inermis =

Scientific classification
- Domain: Eukaryota
- Kingdom: Animalia
- Phylum: Arthropoda
- Class: Insecta
- Order: Orthoptera
- Suborder: Ensifera
- Family: Tettigoniidae
- Subfamily: Phaneropterinae
- Genus: Chinensis; Özdikmen, 2009
- Species: C. inermis

Binomial name
- Chinensis inermis (Liu, 1997)

Synonyms
- Genus synonymy: Shennongia Liu, 1997

Genus of katydids

Chinensis is a genus of bush crickets in the subfamily Phaneropterinae containing a single species, Chinensis inermis from central China.
