= Thecabius =

Scientific classification
- Domain: Eukaryota
- Kingdom: Animalia
- Phylum: Arthropoda
- Class: Insecta
- Order: Hemiptera
- Suborder: Sternorrhyncha
- Family: Aphididae
- Genus: Thecabius; Koch, 1857

Genus of true bugs

Thecabius is a genus of true bugs belonging to the family Aphididae.

The species of this genus are found in Europe and Northern America.

Species:

- Thecabius affinis (Kaltenbach, 1843)
- Thecabius anemoni (Shinji, 1922)
