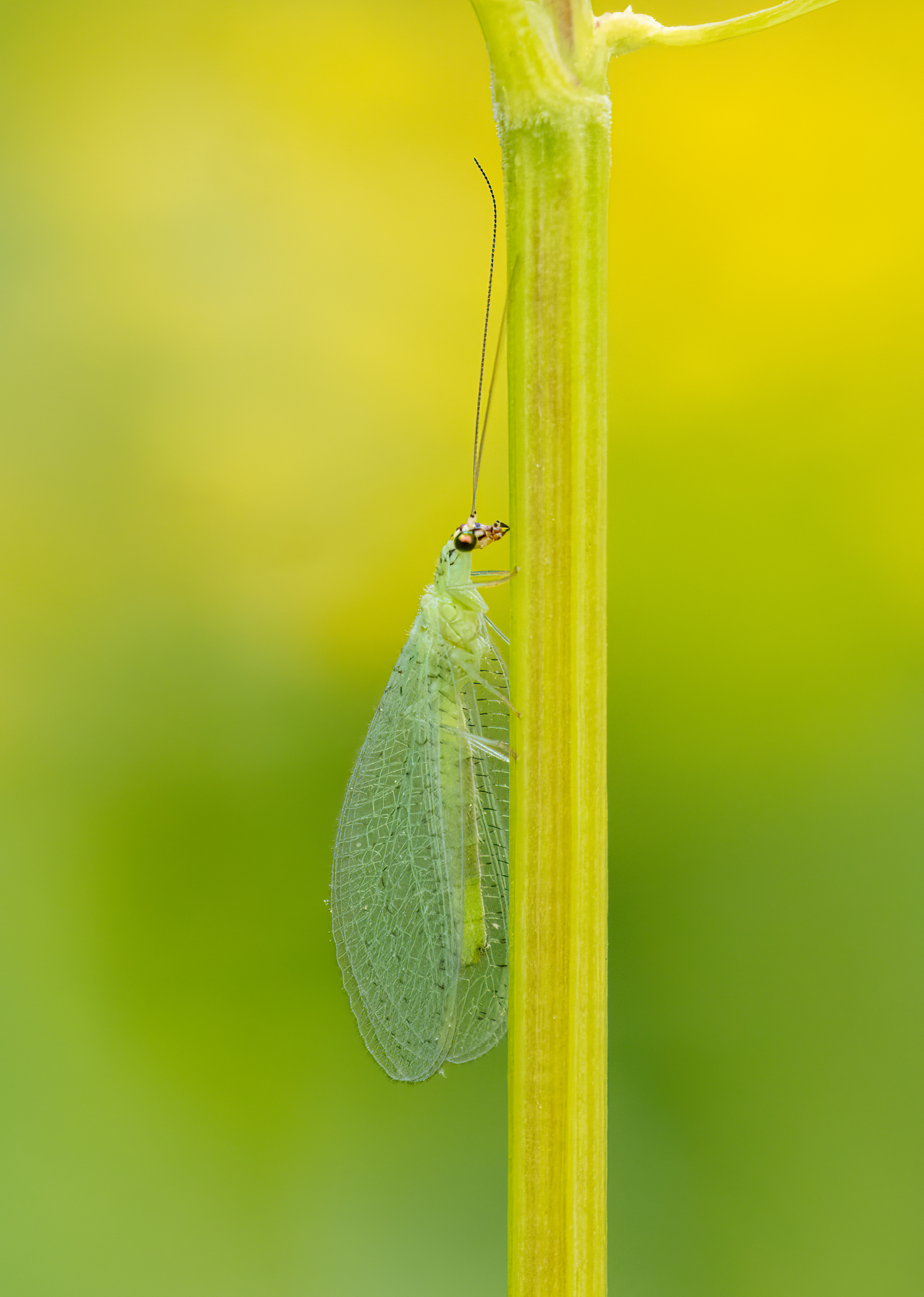

Scientific classification
- Kingdom: Animalia
- Phylum: Arthropoda
- Clade: Pancrustacea
- Class: Insecta
- Order: Neuroptera
- Family: Chrysopidae
- Genus: Chrysopa
- Species: C. oculata

Binomial name
- Chrysopa oculata Say, 1839

Synonyms
- Chrysopa chlorophana Burmeister, 1839; Chrysopa euryptera Burmeister, 1839; Chrysopa latipennis Schneider, 1851; Chrysopa albicornis Fitch, 1855; Chrysopa illepida Fitch, 1855; Chrysopa omikron Fitch, 1855; Chrysopa xanthocephala Fitch, 1855; Chrysopa fulvibucca Fitch, 1855; Chrysopa mississippiensis Fitch, 1855; Chrysopa bipunctata Fitch, 1855; Chrysopa transmarina Hagen, 1861; Nothochrysa annulata MacGillivray, 1894; Chrysopa assimilis Banks, 18989; Chrysopa mexicana Banks, 1901; Chrysopa separata Banks, 1911; Chrysopa rubicunda Navás, 1913; Cintameva conspersa Navás, 1929; Chrysopa conspersa (Navás, 1929)

= Chrysopa oculata =

Species of lacewing

Chrysopa oculata is a species of green lacewing in the family Chrysopidae. It is found transcontinentally from Canada south to Mexico. This species was imported to New Zealand in 1926, as a way to control aphid populations; however, it did not become established in the country.

== Gallery ==
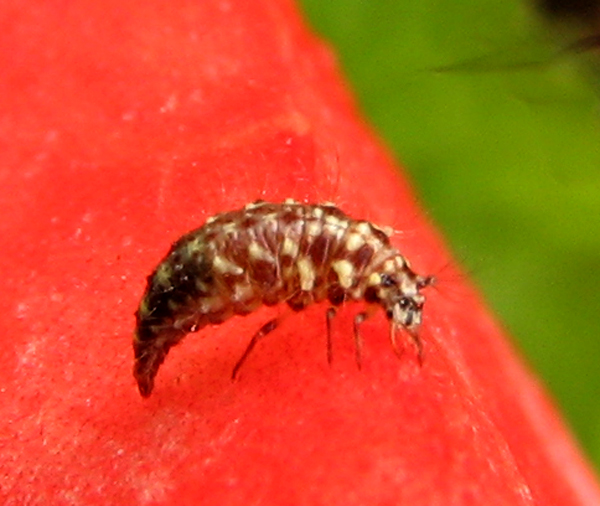
Chrysopa oculata larva in Ontario

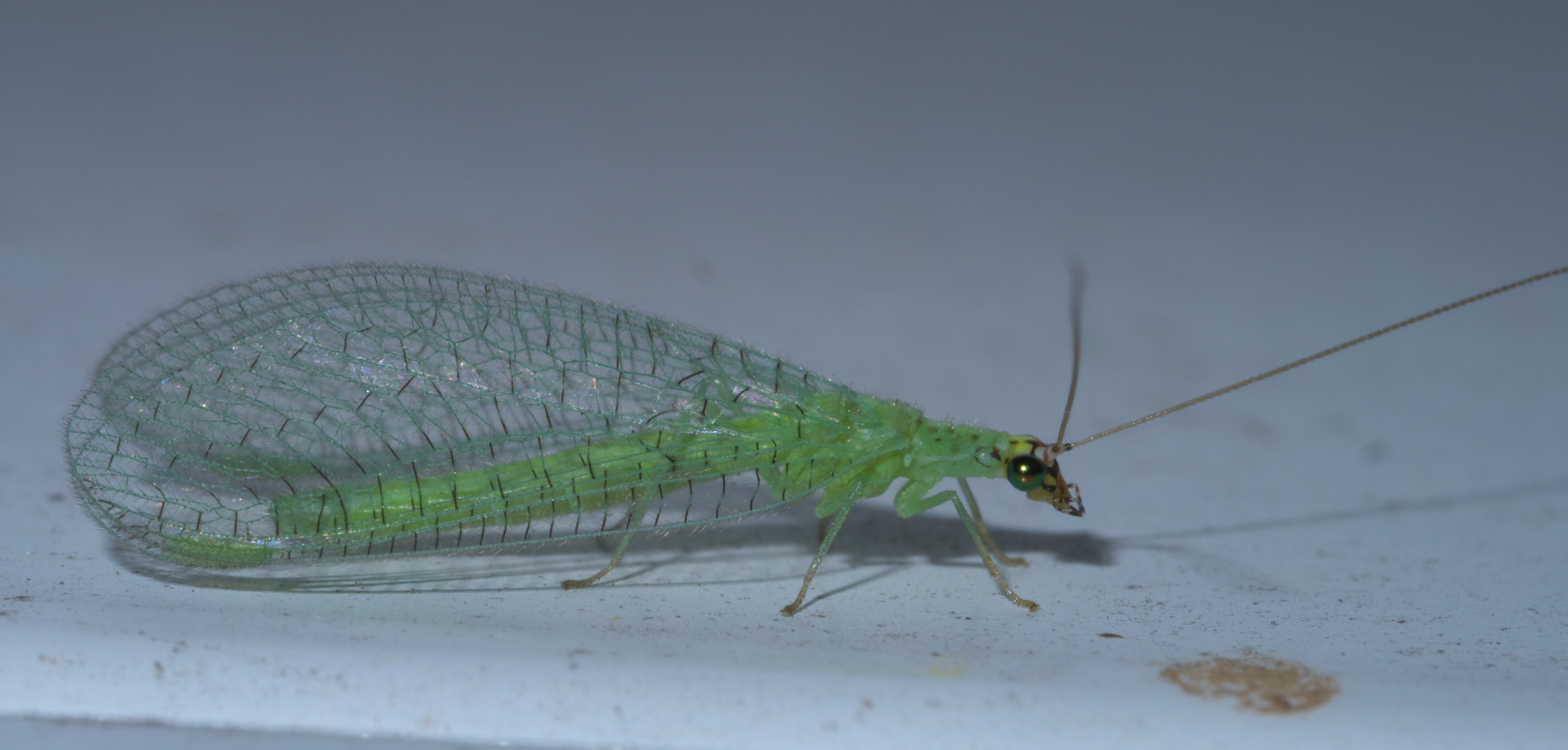
Chrysopa oculata adult in Oklahoma
