= Colopha =

Scientific classification
- Kingdom: Animalia
- Phylum: Arthropoda
- Class: Insecta
- Order: Hemiptera
- Suborder: Sternorrhyncha
- Family: Aphididae
- Tribe: Eriosomatini
- Genus: Colopha; Monell, 1877

Synonyms
- Colophella Börner, 1926; Sinocolopha Tao, 1970

Genus of true bugs

Colopha is a genus of true bugs belonging to the family Aphididae.

The genus was first described by Monell in 1877.

The species of this genus are found in Europe and Northern America.

Species include:

- Colopha compressa (Koch, 1856)
- Colopha ulmicola (Fitch, 1859)
- Colopha graminis (Monell, 1882)
- Colopha hispanica Nieto Nafría & Mier Durante, 1987
- Colopha setaricola Sano & Akimoto, 2005
- Colopha incognita Wegierek, 2019
