= Schlechtendalia chinensis =

Scientific classification
- Domain: Eukaryota
- Kingdom: Animalia
- Phylum: Arthropoda
- Class: Insecta
- Order: Hemiptera
- Suborder: Sternorrhyncha
- Family: Aphididae
- Subfamily: Eriosomatinae
- Genus: Schlechtendalia; Lichtenstein, 1883
- Species: S. chinensis

Binomial name
- Schlechtendalia chinensis (Bell, 1851)

Synonyms
- Abamalekia lazarewi Aphis chinensis Melaphis chinensis Pemphigus sinensis Schlechtendalia intermedia Schlechtendalia mimifushi Schlechtendalia mimmifushi Schlechtendalia miyabei

Species of true bug

Schlechtendalia chinensis, the Chinese sumac aphid, is an aphid species, and the only species in the genus Schlechtendalia.

The species produce galls on the Chinese sumac (Rhus chinensis). The gall is called Chinese gall, Galla Chinensis or wu bei zi (五倍子) in Chinese. It is rich in gallotannins, a type of hydrolysable tannins. The infestation by Chinese sumac aphids can lead to a gall which is valued as a commercial product. Chinese galls are used in Chinese medicine to treat coughs, diarrhea, night sweats, dysentery and to stop intestinal and uterine bleeding.
