= Chinensis =

Chinensis, Chinese in Latin, may refer to:

- Chinensis (katydid), a katydid genus
- a cultivar of Passiflora caerulea, the blue passion flower
