= List of moths of Australia (Plutellidae) =

Partial list of Australian moths

This is a list of the Australian moth species of the family Plutellidae. It also acts as an index to the species articles and forms part of the full List of moths of Australia.

- Chrysorthenches callibrya (Turner, 1923)
- Chrysorthenches lagarostrobi Dugdale, 1996
- Chrysorthenches microstrobi Dugdale, 1996
- Diathryptica proterva Meyrick, 1907
- Diathryptica theticopis Turner, 1923
- Leuroperna sera (Meyrick, 1885)
- Mychonoa mesozona Meyrick, 1893
- Orthenches epiphricta Meyrick, 1907
- Orthenches liparochroa Turner, 1923
- Orthenches pleurosticta Turner, 1923
- Phalangitis crymorrhoa Meyrick, 1907
- Phalangitis pellochroa Turner, 1913
- Phalangitis triaria Meyrick, 1907
- Phalangitis tumultuosa Meyrick, 1907
- Phalangitis veterana Meyrick, 1907
- Plutella australiana Landry & Hebert, 2013
- Plutella psammochroa Meyrick, 1885
- Plutella xylostella (Linnaeus, 1758)
- Tonza purella Walker, 1864
- Tritymba acrospila (Turner, 1927)
- Tritymba aulophora (Meyrick, 1918)
- Tritymba dasybathra Lower, 1894
- Tritymba dianipha (Turner, 1926)
- Tritymba diatoma (Turner, 1923)
- Tritymba ochrocera (Turner, 1923)
- Tritymba pamphaea (Turner, 1923)
- Tritymba stichogramma (Turner, 1923)
- Tritymba xanthocoma Lower, 1894
