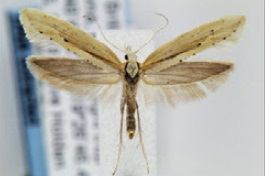

Scientific classification
- Domain: Eukaryota
- Kingdom: Animalia
- Phylum: Arthropoda
- Class: Insecta
- Order: Lepidoptera
- Family: Plutellidae
- Genus: Plutella
- Species: P. armoraciae

Binomial name
- Plutella armoraciae Busck, 1912

Synonyms
- Plutella amoraciae Marsh, 1913; Plutella monochlora Meyrick, 1914

= Plutella armoraciae =

Species of moth

Plutella armoraciae is a moth of the family Plutellidae. It is found in north-western North America.

The wingspan is about 18 mm. Adults superficially look like a very pale Plutella xylostella.

The larvae feed on Armoracia species.
