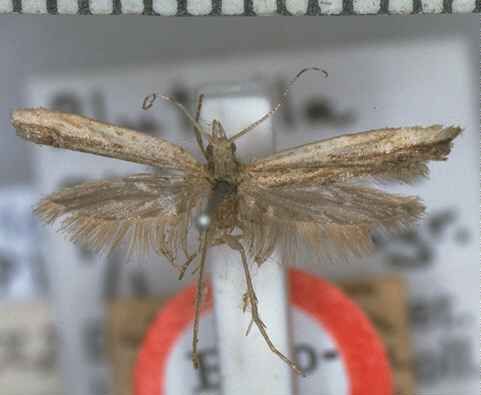
- Female holotype

Scientific classification
- Kingdom: Animalia
- Phylum: Arthropoda
- Class: Insecta
- Order: Lepidoptera
- Family: Plutellidae
- Genus: Plutella
- Species: P. antiphona

Binomial name
- Plutella antiphona Meyrick, 1901

= Plutella antiphona =

Species of moth endemic to New Zealand

Plutella antiphona, also known as the diamondback moth, is a moth of the family Plutellidae first described by Edward Meyrick in 1901. It is endemic to New Zealand.

== Description ==
This species is very similar in appearance to Plutella xylostella and can only be distinguished from that species either by examining the larvae, the pupae or the adult genitalia. The diamond pattern on the forewings of this species is variable and can be blurred or faded.

== Distribution ==
It is endemic to New Zealand and is found throughout the country.

== Habitat and hosts ==
P. antiphona inhabit open areas including cultivated places like gardens. Larvae of this species feed on plants in the Brassicaceae family.

== Behaviour ==
The larvae make a web of silk on the lower side of the leaves and produce see through windows in the leaf structure as they feed. They pupate in a cocoon made of silk either on the ground or alternatively on their host plant. Adults are on the wing throughout the year and are both day and night flying. They are attracted to light.

== Interaction with humans ==
Although this species feeds on plants in the Brassicaceae family it is not regarded as a serious pest of agricultural crops.
