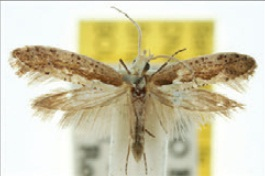

Scientific classification
- Kingdom: Animalia
- Phylum: Arthropoda
- Clade: Pancrustacea
- Class: Insecta
- Order: Lepidoptera
- Family: Plutellidae
- Genus: Plutella
- Species: P. australiana

Binomial name
- Plutella australiana Landry & Hebert, 2013

= Plutella australiana =

Species of moth

Plutella australiana is a moth of the family Plutellidae. It is found in eastern Australia.

The length of the forewings 5.4–6.9 mm for males and 5.6–6.9 mm for females. In external appearance P. australiana is indistinguishable from Plutella xylostella, a global pest of cruciferous plants. Both species exhibit significant, overlapping variation in forewing pattern. Most specimens of both species have the pale, scalloped band along the hind/dorsal margin typically used to recognize P. xylostella. That band varies from strongly marked to nearly indistinct (the latter particularly so in females) in both species. Differences in genitalia morphology has been noted by Landry and Herbert. Further evidence supports the separation of the two species, sequencing of a ~500 bp amplicon of the mitochondrial Cytochrome Oxidase I gene showed 8.6% sequence divergence.

P. xylostella is thought to feed on a wide variety of cruciferous plants in Australia, including native and introduced species. However, Australian records are in question because of the past oversight of P. australiana. As a result, host plant preference of P. australiana may not be identical to P. xylostella, however Australian P. xylostella is thought to have the same host range as samples collected from elsewhere in the world.

== Etymology ==
This species name reflects the current restriction of the species to Australia.
