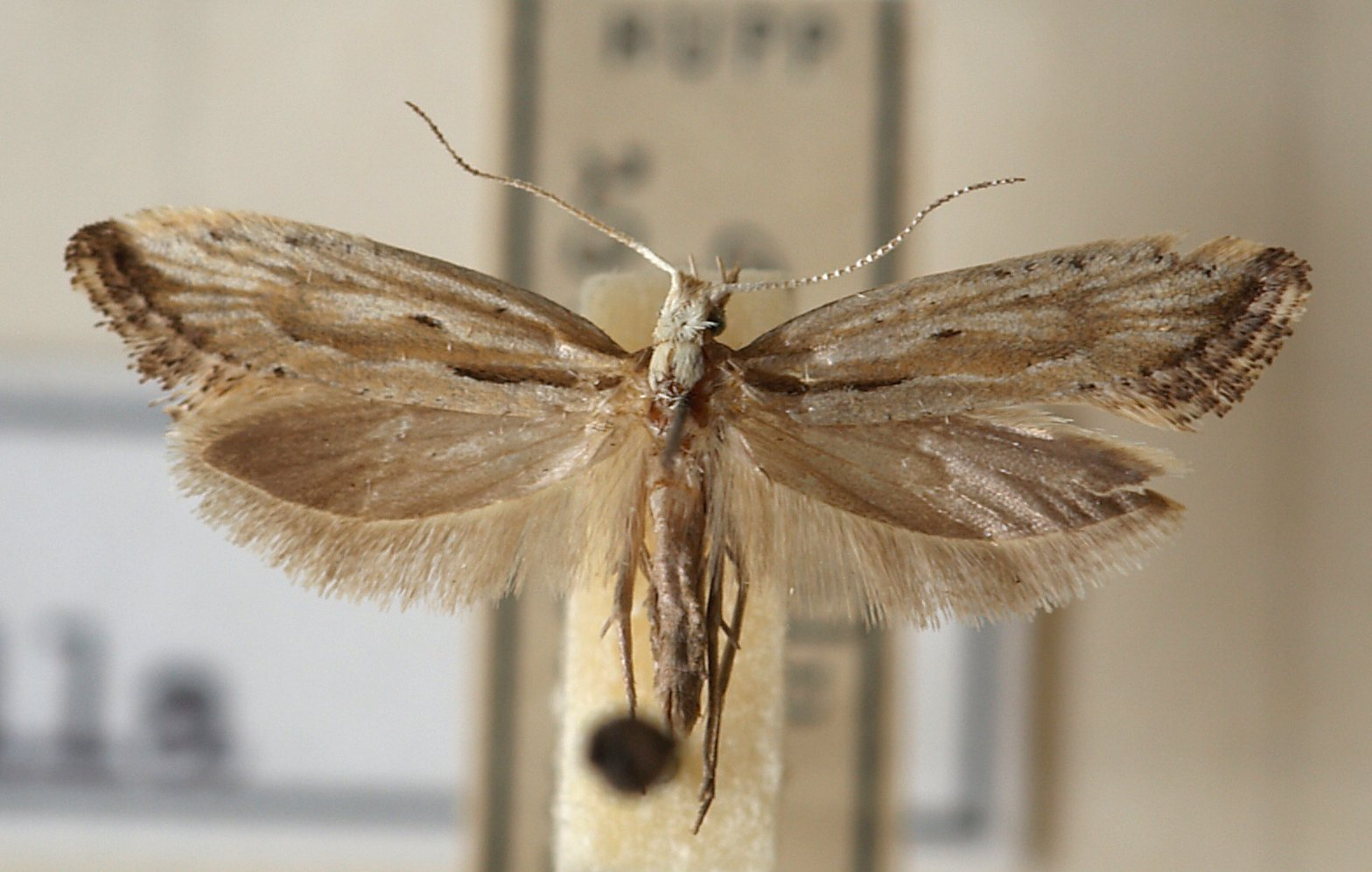

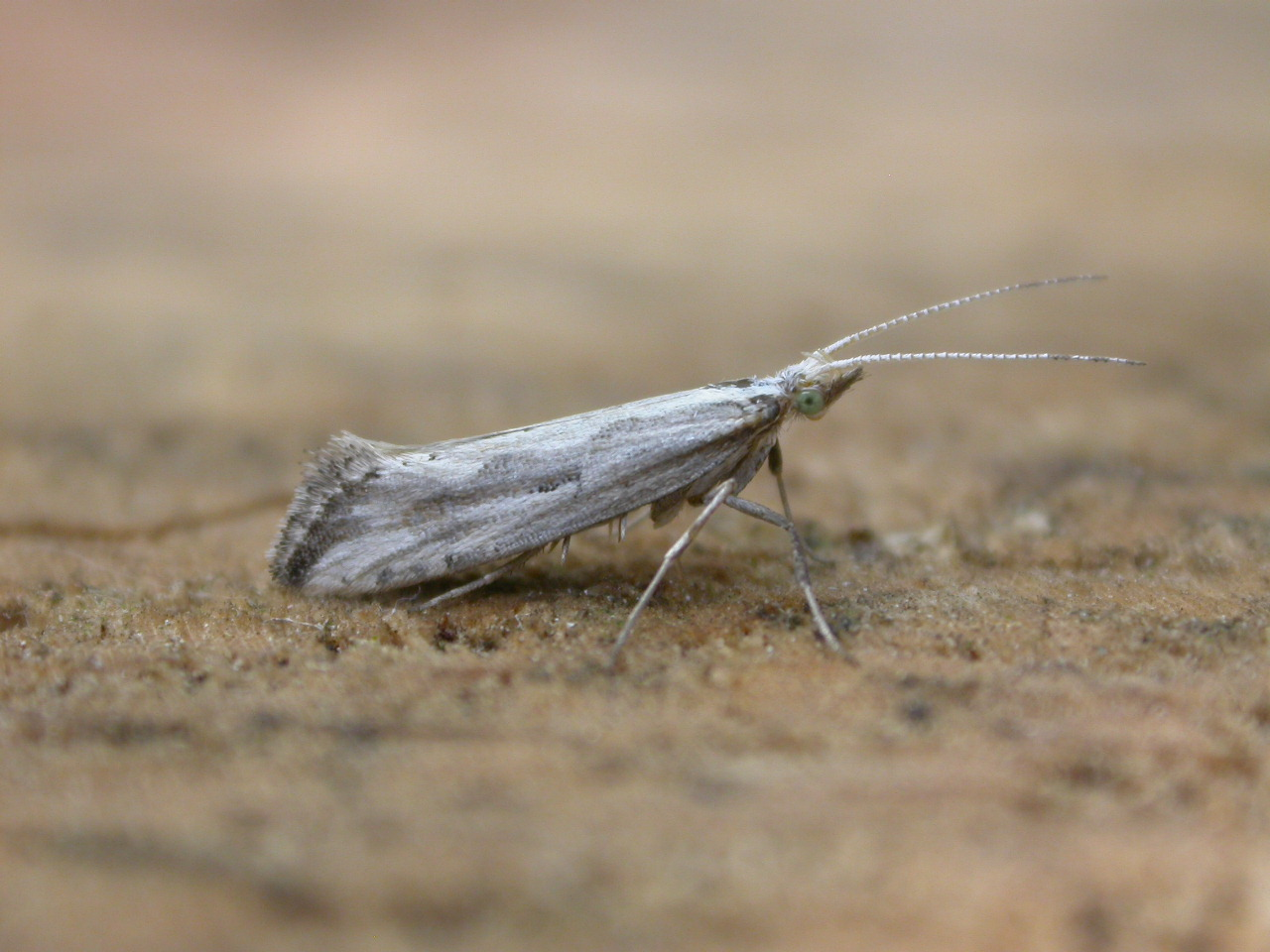

Scientific classification
- Kingdom: Animalia
- Phylum: Arthropoda
- Class: Insecta
- Order: Lepidoptera
- Family: Plutellidae
- Genus: Plutella
- Species: P. porrectella

Binomial name
- Plutella porrectella (Linnaeus, 1758)

Synonyms
- Phalaena porrectella Linnaeus, 1758; Pseudoplutella porrectella; Plutella hesperidella (Hübner, 1796); Plutella vigilaciella Clemens, 1860

= Plutella porrectella =

Species of moth

Plutella porrectella is a moth of the family Plutellidae found in Europe, the Caucasus, southern Siberia and Asia Minor.

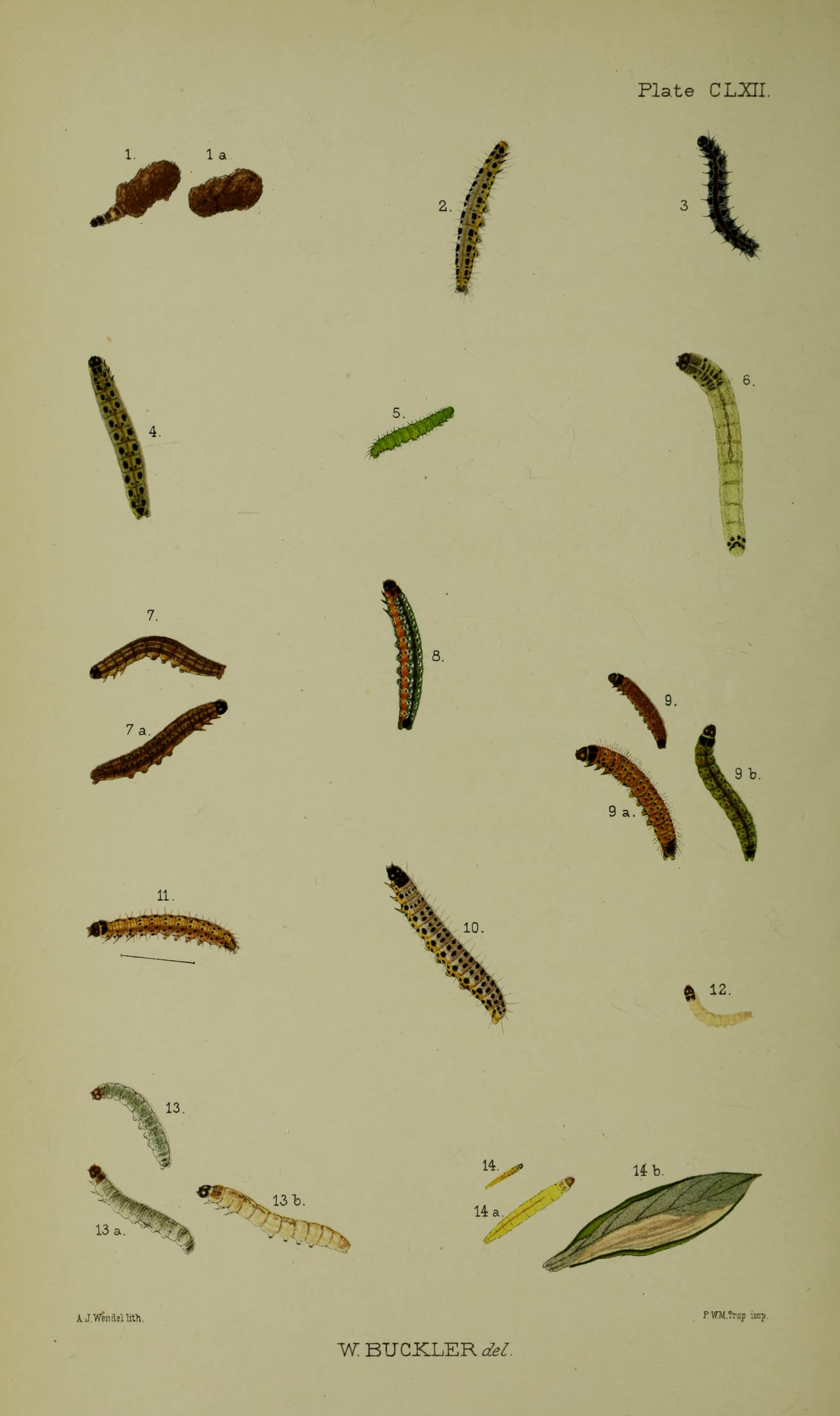
Fig. 5 larva after final moult

The wingspan is 14–17 mm. The head is ochreous-whitish, with central fuscous line. Tuft of palpi long. Forewings pale ochreous, suffusedly streaked with whitish; costa and dorsum blackish - dotted; a whitish subdorsal longitudinal line, thrice sinuate upwards, margined above with an ocbreous-brownish suffusion and some blackish scales, darkest in the depressions discal stigmata usually indicated by dark fuscous dashes termen ochreous-brown, spotted with black. Hindwings are light grey. The larva is light green; dorsal line darker; dots black; head brownish - marked.

Adults are on wing in May and again from July to August.

The larvae feed on Brassicaceae species, including Hesperis matronalis. They distort or connect the leaves of their host plants with small amounts of silk.
