= Plutella polaris =

Scientific classification
- Kingdom: Animalia
- Phylum: Arthropoda
- Class: Insecta
- Order: Lepidoptera
- Family: Plutellidae
- Genus: Plutella
- Species: P. polaris

Binomial name
- Plutella polaris Zeller, 1880

Species of moth genus Plutella

Plutella polaris is a moth species in the family Plutellidae and was first described by Philipp Christoph Zeller in 1880. It is known to occur in Svalbard, Norway, and the Altai Mountains of Russia.

== Formal description ==
Plutella polaris was described by Philipp Christoph Zeller in 1880 from specimens collected by Alfred Edwin Eaton at Svalbard in July 1873. The species was not recorded again until the collection of a single specimen at the Indre Wijdefjorden National Park of Svalbard in July 2015, which is the first female specimen described.

== Distribution ==
P. polaris is one of three known resident Lepidoptera species of Svalbard, alongside Apamea exulis and Pyla fusca. A male specimen was collected from the Altai Mountains in Russia in 2016.

== Appearance ==
P. polaris has brown-grey coloured forewings with a broad, paler band along the posterior margin, which is marked with dark dots. The paler band widens in the posterior wing corner. The costal half of the forewings are paler than the medial half.
