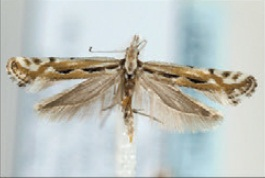

Scientific classification
- Kingdom: Animalia
- Phylum: Arthropoda
- Clade: Pancrustacea
- Class: Insecta
- Order: Lepidoptera
- Family: Plutellidae
- Genus: Plutella
- Species: P. geniatella

Binomial name
- Plutella geniatella Zeller, 1839

Synonyms
- Plutelloptera geniatella Baraniak, 2007

= Plutella geniatella =

Species of moth

Plutella geniatella is a moth of the family Plutellidae. It is found in France, Germany, Austria, Switzerland, Italy and Romania.
