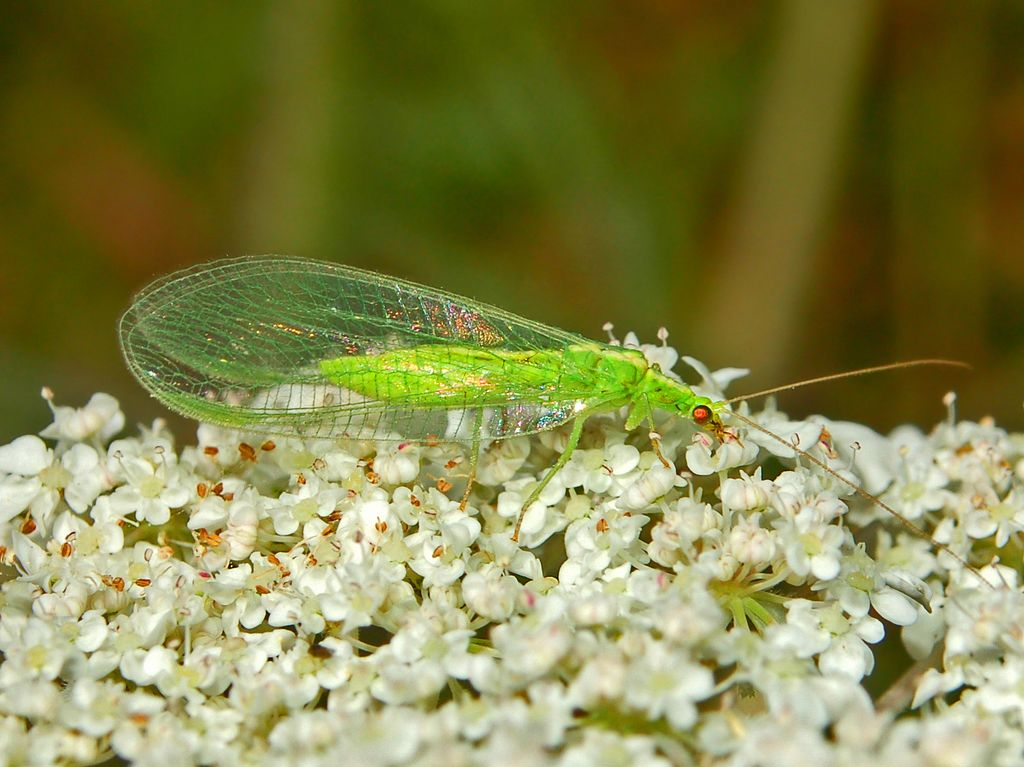
- Adult Chrysoperla sp. photographed in France

Scientific classification
- Kingdom: Animalia
- Phylum: Arthropoda
- Clade: Pancrustacea
- Class: Insecta
- Order: Neuroptera
- Family: Chrysopidae
- Subfamily: Chrysopinae
- Tribe: Chrysopini
- Genus: Chrysoperla; Steinmann, 1964

Diversity
- Over 60 species

= Chrysoperla =

Genus of insects

Chrysoperla is a genus of common green lacewings in the neuropteran family Chrysopidae. Therein they belong to the Chrysopini, the largest tribe of subfamily Chrysopinae. Their larvae are predatory and feed on aphids, and members of this genus have been used in biological pest control.

== Taxonomy and phylogeny ==
The genus Chrysoperla was first described by H. Steinmann in 1964 as a subgenus of Chrysopa as Chrysopa (Chrysoperla). His original diagnosis based on facial markings was found to be unreliable by B. Tjeder in 1966, who revised Steinmann's subgeneric classification based on details of male genitalia. In 1970, H. Hölzel revised these subgenera further and moved Chrysoperla to a subgenus of Atlantochrysa as Atlantochrysa (Chrysoperla). It wasn't until 1977 that Chrysoperla was elevated to a full genus by Y. Séméria, based on the combination of the absence of a gonapsis in males, lack of carrying a debris packet in larvae, and overwintering as an adult. This series of revisions further caused species to be moved between genera several times as the taxa, particularly Chrysopa and Chrysoperla, were being redefined. The monophyly of the genus was verified in the revision of Chrysopidae genera by Brooks and Barnard in 1990.

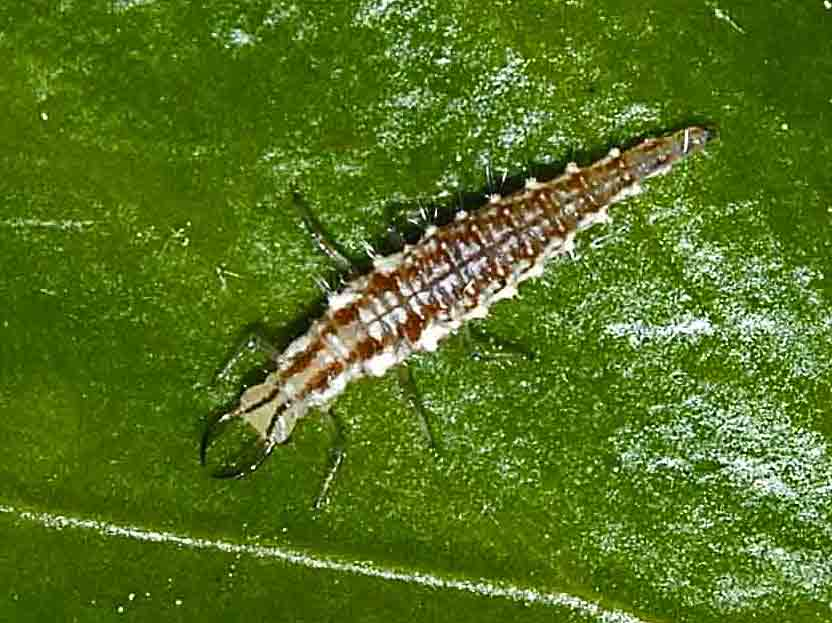
Larva of a Chrysoperla species from Italy

== Description and identification ==
Chrysoperla is one of several green lacewing genera with adults having a pale, yellowish stripe down the middle of the body. It is typically separated from other such genera by the short intramedian cell (im), which doesn't overlap the first crossvein from the radial sector. This genus, however, is defined predominantly based on male genitalia. Chrysoperla is one of six genera possessing an arcuate tignum and three genera to lack a gonapsis. It is distinguished from all other green lacewing genera by the presence of spinellae on the gonosaccus in the male genitalia.

Chrysoperla species may be identical in terms of morphology, but can be readily separated based on the vibration signals used to attract mates. For example, the southern European C. mediterranea looks almost identical to its northern relative C. carnea, but their courtship "songs" are very different; individuals of one species will not react to the other's vibrations.

== Distribution ==
This genus has a cosmopolitan distribution. Species in this genus are particularly common in both Europe and North America.

== Species ==
There are 67 described species of Chrysoperla. New species of the genus are still being described, particularly since the genus contains at least one cryptic species complex.

- Chrysoperla adamsi (Henry, Wells & Pupedis, 1993)
- Chrysoperla affinis Henry et al., 2003
- Chrysoperla agilis Henry, Brooks, Duelli & Johnson, 2003
- Chrysoperla ankylopteryformis Monserrat & Díaz Aranda, 1989
- Chrysoperla annae Brooks, 1994
- Chrysoperla argentina González & Reguilón, 2002
- Chrysoperla asoralis (Banks, 1915)
- Chrysoperla barberina (Navás, 1932)
- Chrysoperla bellatula X.-k. Yang & C.-k. Yang, 1992
- Chrysoperla bolti Henry et al., 2018
- Chrysoperla brevicollis (Rambur, 1842)
- Chrysoperla calocedrii Henry et al., 2012
- Chrysoperla carnea (Stephens, 1836)
- Chrysoperla chusanina (Navás, 1933)
- Chrysoperla comanche (Banks, 1938)
- Chrysoperla comans (Tjeder, 1966)
- Chrysoperla congrua (Walker, 1853)
- Chrysoperla decaryana (Navás, 1934)
- Chrysoperla defreitasi Brooks, 1994
- Chrysoperla deserticola Hölzel & Ohm, 2003
- Chrysoperla downesi (Smith, 1932)
- Chrysoperla dozieri (R. C. Smith, 1931)
- Chrysoperla duellii Henry, 2019
- Chrysoperla euneura X.-k. Yang & C.-k. Yang, 1992
- Chrysoperla europaea Canard & Thierry, 2020
- Chrysoperla exotera (Navás, 1914)
- Chrysoperla externa (Hagen, 1861)
- Chrysoperla exul (McLachlan, 1869)
- Chrysoperla furcifera (Okamoto, 1914)
- Chrysoperla galapagoensis (Banks, 1924)
- Chrysoperla gallagheri Hölzel, 1989
- Chrysoperla genanigra de Freitas, 2003
- Chrysoperla hainanica X.-k. Yang & C.-k. Yang, 1992
- Chrysoperla harrisii (Fitch, 1855)
- Chrysoperla heidarii Henry et al., 2014
- Chrysoperla insulata (Fraser, 1957)
- Chrysoperla johnsoni Henry, Wells & Pupedis, 1993
- Chrysoperla longicaudata X.-k. Yang & C.-k. Yang, 1992
- Chrysoperla lucasina (Lacroix, 1912)
- Chrysoperla mediterranea (Hölzel, 1972)
- Chrysoperla mexicana Brooks, 1994
- Chrysoperla mutata (McLachlan, 1898)
- Chrysoperla nigrinervis Brooks, 1994
- Chrysoperla nigrocapitata Henry et al., 2015
- Chrysoperla nipponensis (Okamoto, 1914)
- Chrysoperla nyerina (Navás, 1933)
- Chrysoperla oblita (Hölzel, 1973)
- Chrysoperla orestes (Banks, 1911)
- Chrysoperla pallida Henry, Brooks, Duelli & Johnson, 2002
- Chrysoperla plicata (Tjeder, 1966)
- Chrysoperla plorabunda (Fitch, 1855)
- Chrysoperla pudica (Navás, 1914)
- Chrysoperla qinlingensis C.-k. Yang & X.-k. Yang, 1989
- Chrysoperla raimundoi de Freitas & Penny, 2001
- Chrysoperla renoni (Lacroix, 1933)
- Chrysoperla rotundata (Navás, 1929)
- Chrysoperla rufilabris (Burmeister, 1839)
- Chrysoperla savioi (Navás, 1933)
- Chrysoperla shahrudensis Henry et al., 2018
- Chrysoperla siamensis Brooks, 1994
- Chrysoperla sola X.-k. Yang & C.-k. Yang, 1992
- Chrysoperla suzukii (Okamoto, 1919)
- Chrysoperla thelephora C.-k. Yang & X.-k. Yang, 1989
- Chrysoperla volcanicola Hölzel et al., 1999
- Chrysoperla xizangana (C.-k. Yang et al. in F.-s. Huang et al., 1988)
- Chrysoperla yulinica C.-k. Yang & X.-k. Yang, 1989
- Chrysoperla zastrowi (Esben-Petersen, 1928)
  - Chrysoperla zastrowi sillemi (Esben-Petersen, 1935)

=== Provisional taxa ===
There are at least 8 additional "song species" that have been identified within the Chrysoperla carnea group but have yet to be formally described.

- Chrysoperla carnea-kyrgyzstan - Kyrgyzstan
- Chrysoperla downesi-1 - eastern United States
- Chrysoperla downesi-china - China
- Chrysoperla downesi-kyrgyzstan - Kyrgyzstan
- Chrysoperla downesi-western - western United States
- Chrysoperla nipponensis-a2 - Asia
- Chrysoperla nipponensis-b - Asia

== Gallery ==
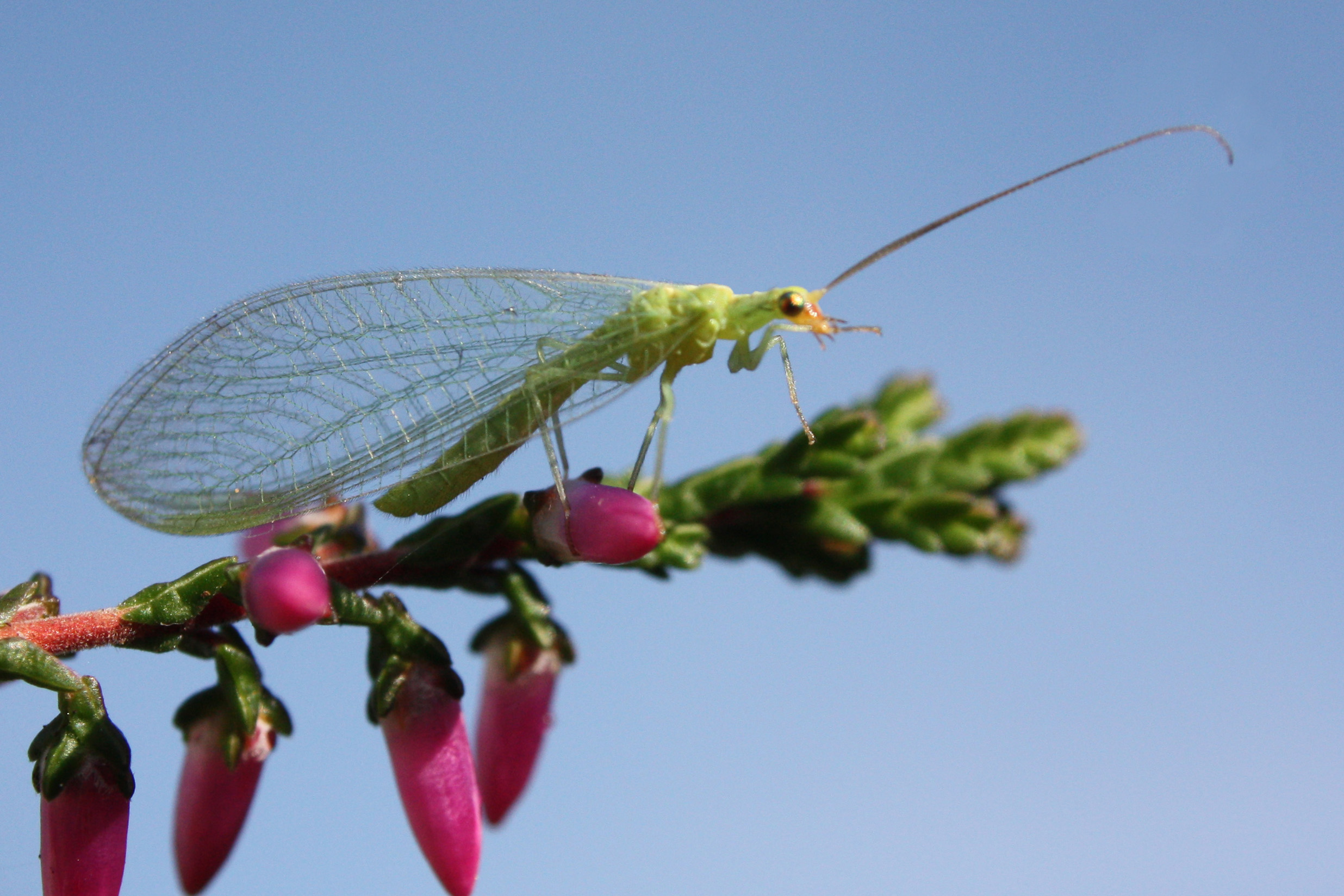
Chrysoperla from Oxford, England

Chrysoperla larva feeding on aphid in Italy

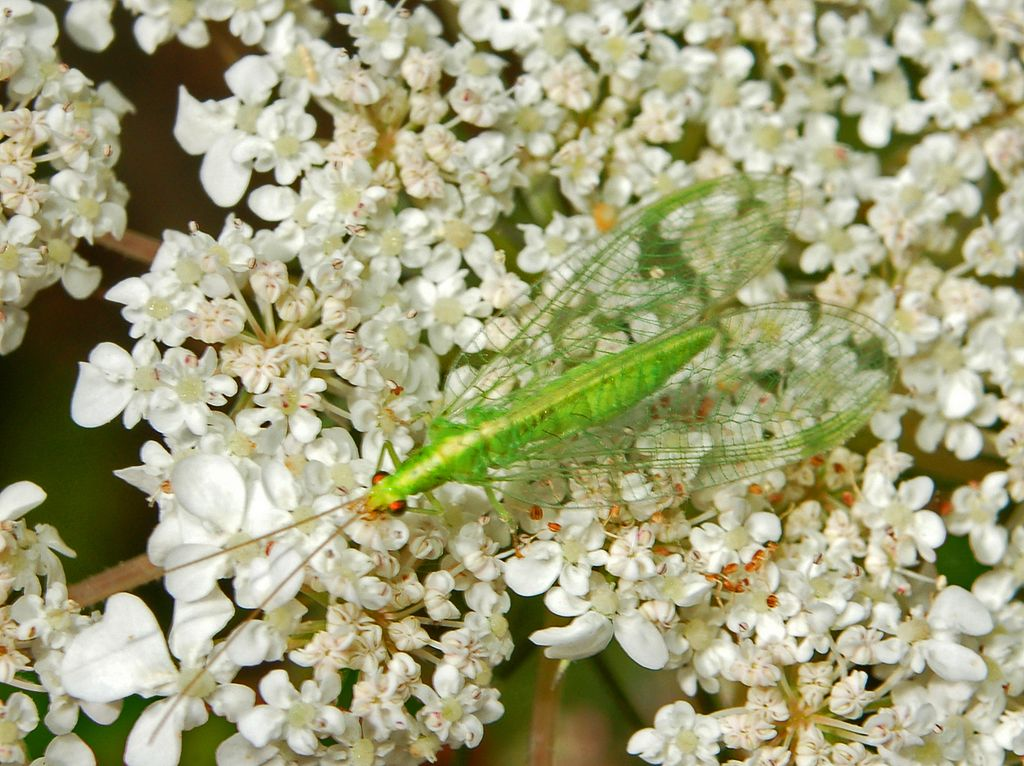
Chrysoperla from France

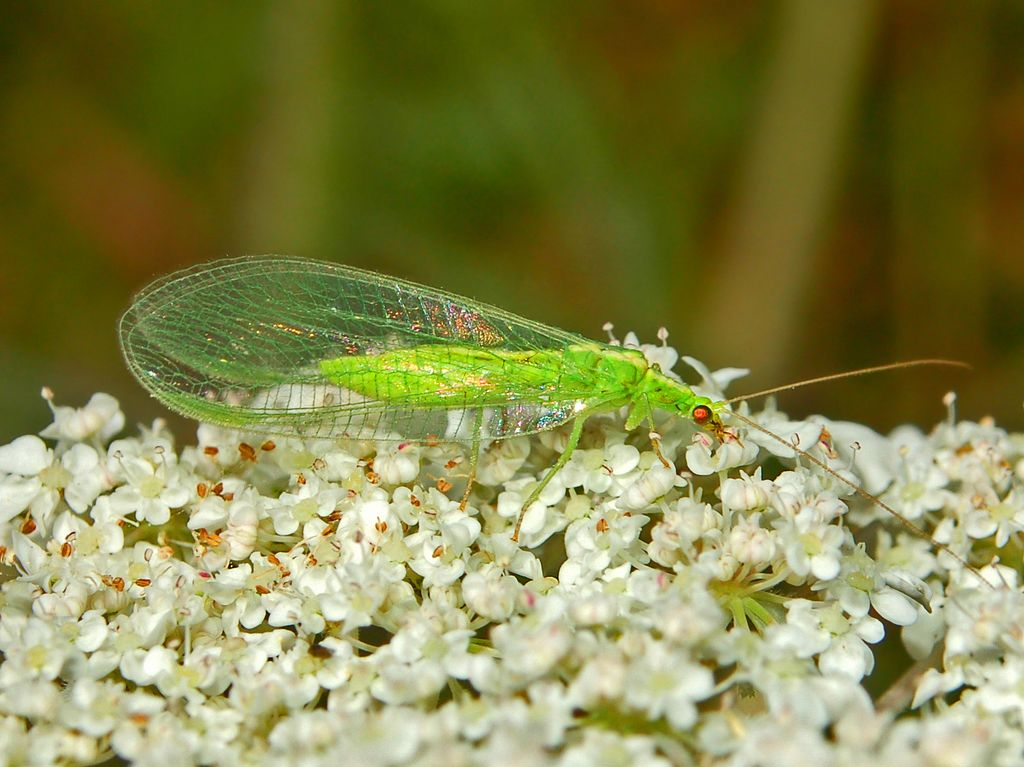
Chrysoperla from France

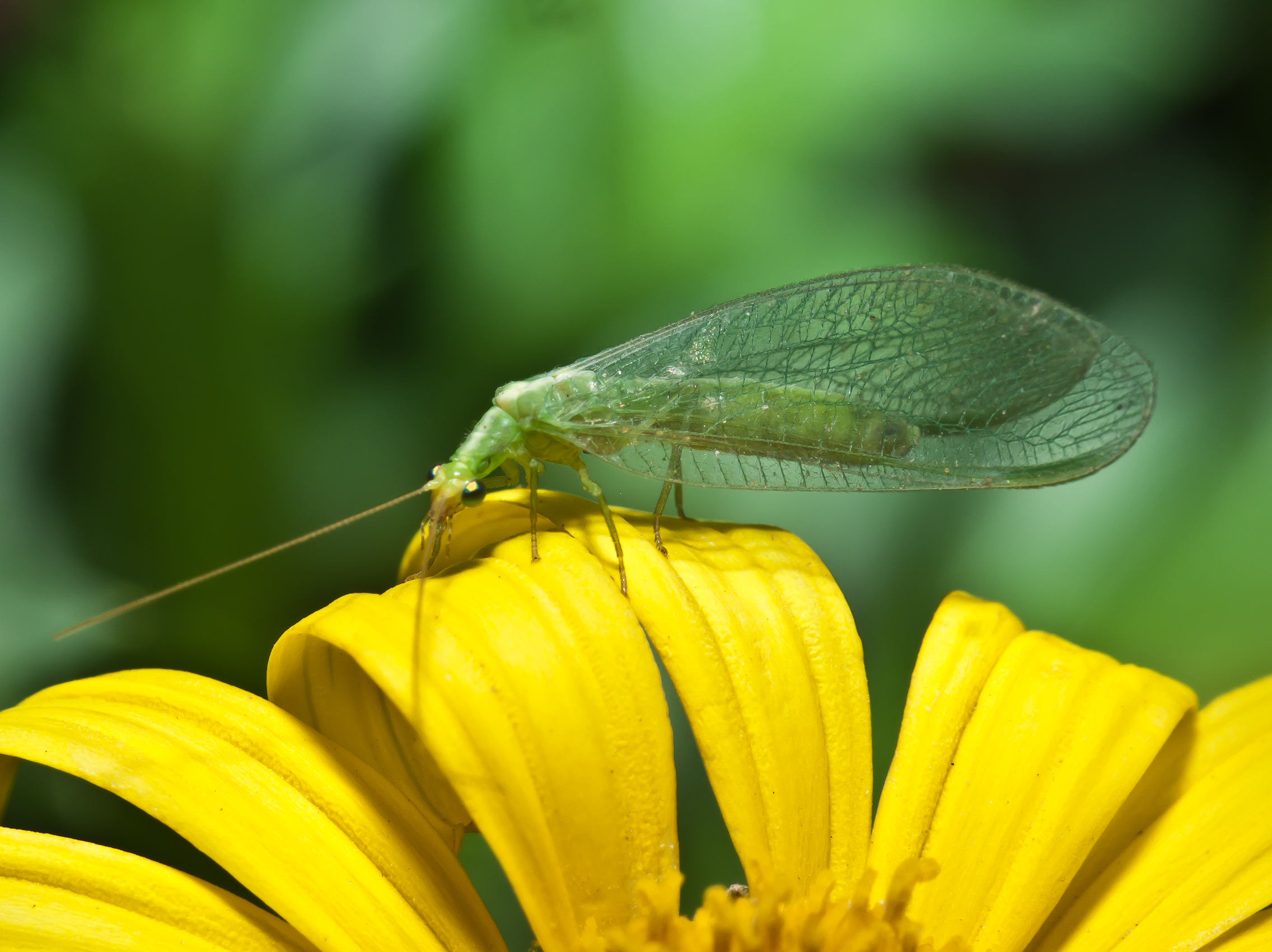
Chrysoperla from Brión, Galicia, Spain

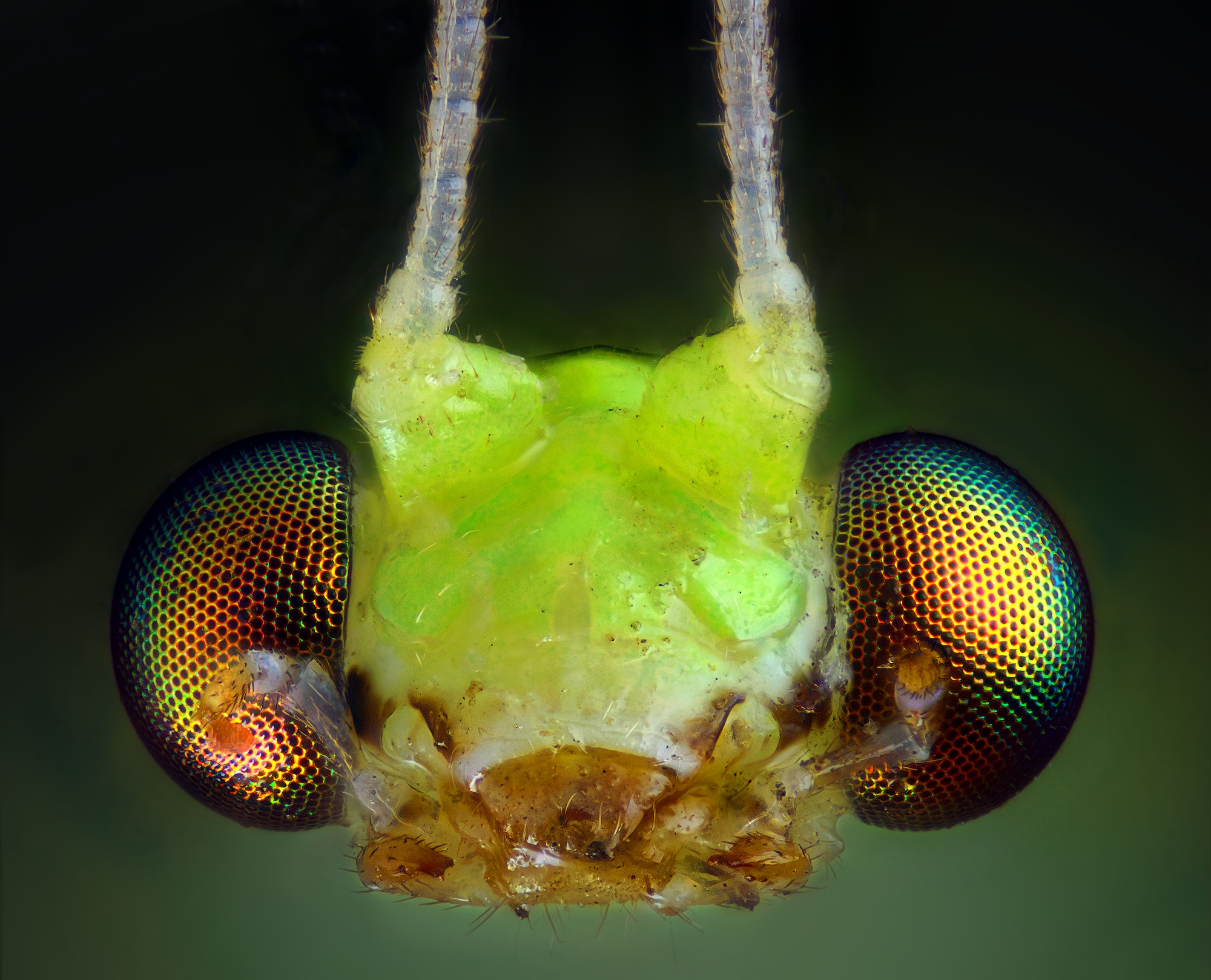
Chrysoperla from Russia
