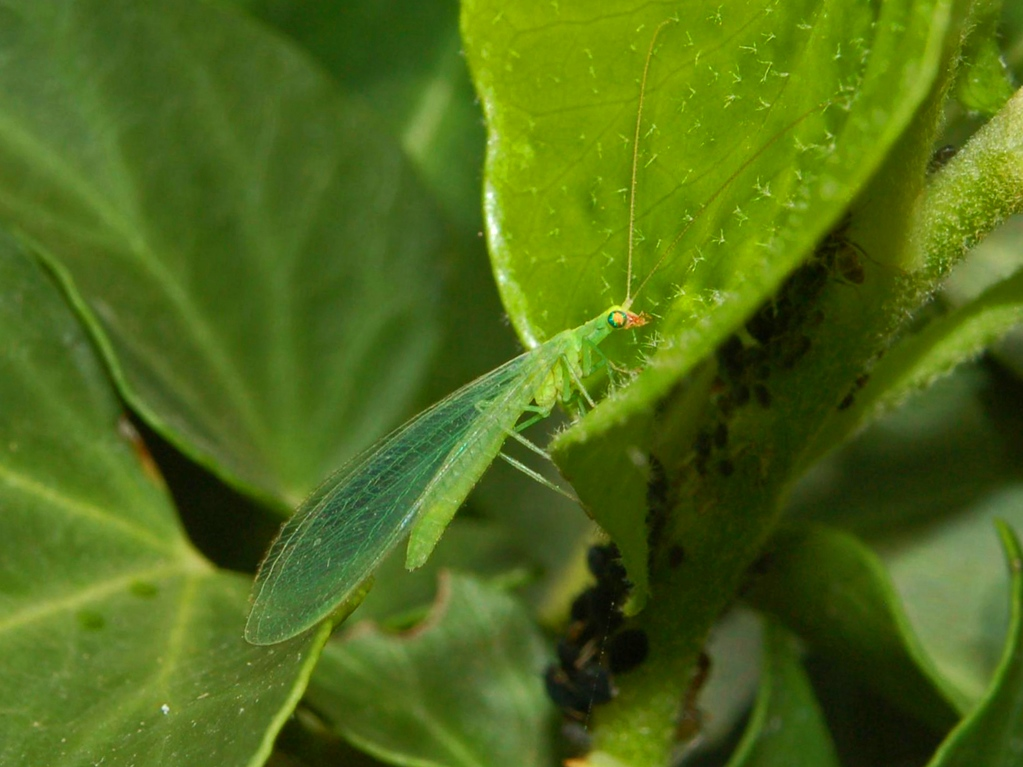
- Chrysoperla cf. lucasina

Scientific classification
- Kingdom: Animalia
- Phylum: Arthropoda
- Clade: Pancrustacea
- Class: Insecta
- Order: Neuroptera
- Family: Chrysopidae
- Genus: Chrysoperla
- Species: C. lucasina

Binomial name
- Chrysoperla lucasina (Lacroix, 1912)

Audio

= Chrysoperla lucasina =

Species of insect

Chrysoperla lucasina is a species of neuropteran of the family Chrysopidae (subfamily Chrysopinae). They are found mainly in the United Kingdom, the Czech Republic, France, Germany, Greece, Italy, Spain, Portugal, Switzerland, in western Asia and northern Africa.

Chrysoperla lucasina can be distinguished from other members of the carnea-group of the genus Chrysoperla by subtle and variable morphological attributes. Species within the genus are largely demarcated by unique vibrational courtship songs, with a distinct, geographically constant combination of long and short songs characterizing C. lucasina. As males and females establish duets of identical songs before copulation, the songs serve to reproductively isolate species and prevent hybridization within the genus.

Adults can be encountered from late Spring through mid-Autumn. They are polyphagous, feeding on pollen and nectar of various herbaceous flowering plants (mainly Brassicaceae, Poaceae, Apiaceae, and Asteraceae), as well as on honeydew, their preferred diet in Autumn.

After the feeding period, they fly near colonies of aphids, where they breed and the females lay eggs. Unlike the adults, the larvae are fearsome predators; consequently, these insects are used for the biological pest control of aphids and other small arthropods. The adult insects hibernate in winter.
