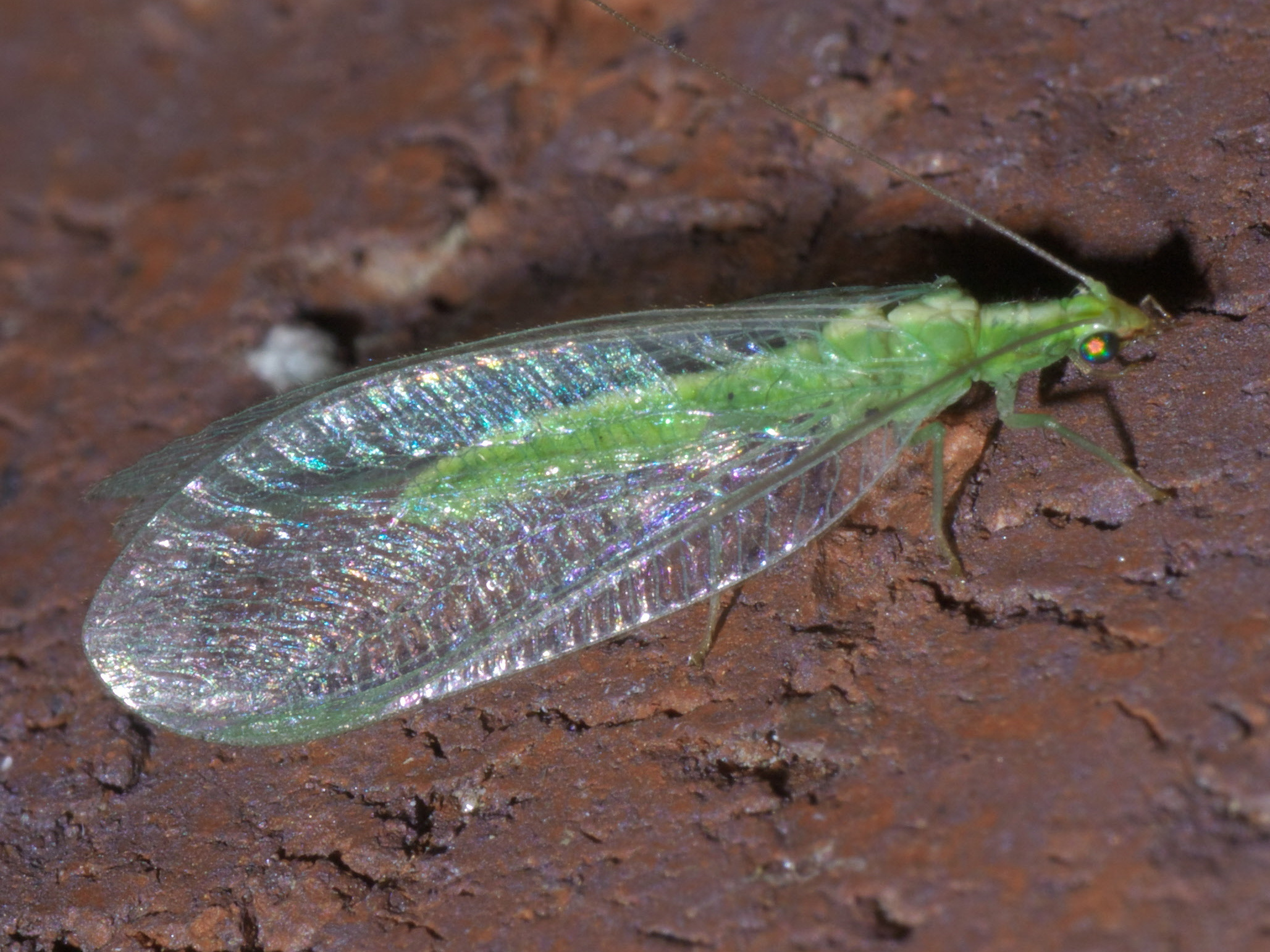

Scientific classification
- Kingdom: Animalia
- Phylum: Arthropoda
- Clade: Pancrustacea
- Class: Insecta
- Order: Neuroptera
- Family: Chrysopidae
- Genus: Chrysoperla
- Species: C. plorabunda

Binomial name
- Chrysoperla plorabunda (Fitch, 1855)

= Chrysoperla plorabunda =

Species of insect

Chrysoperla plorabunda, also known as the weeping green lacewing, is an insect belonging to the cryptic carnea complex of the genus. Species in the complex are nearly identical in morphology, with differences in substrate-borne vibrational songs being the only identifying factor. C. plorabunda has a widespread distribution across North America, ranging from coast to coast and from northern Canada down to Mexico. Within that range, they are typically found in open habitats such as grasslands and cultivated fields, as well as on the edges of deciduous forests and within coniferous forests. Adults feed predominately on nectar and honeydew, while larvae feed on other soft-bodied arthropods.

== Biology ==
=== Morphology ===
Adults of C. plorabunda range from 12-20mm in size, with a forewing length of 9-14mm. While coloration is most often observed to be bright green in adults, there is a wide variety in overall body color that is possible. Larvae are brown following emergence from the egg, and gain their green coloration first as a pupa and into adulthood.

Adults change coloration from green to brown shortly after the induction of diapause, synchronizing their color with that of the changing leaves of deciduous plants. Brown diapause coloration can remain after diapause is terminated, with the shift back to green only occurring when average temperature increases. The intensity of color change that occurs in either direction can vary depending on the life stage of the individual, as well as the speed of transition from long to short days. Regardless of the current coloration, C. plorabunda have a yellow stripe down the center of their body and a dark brown stripe marking their head.

=== Juvenile behavior ===
As larvae, C. plorabunda engage in tonic immobility, a behavior that is colloquially known as "death feigning." This is a maintained, motionless posture that involves both behavioral and psychological changes associated with death, and is undertaken when larvae are in close proximity to a predator. This behavior is utilized alongside other defensive mechanisms, such as biting mandibles, paralytic and digestive venoms, and deterrent anal secretions, with larvae with fewer energy reserves being more likely to enter tonic immobility than to utilize other defenses.

Another behavior unique to juveniles for C. plorabunda are obligatory migrations taken before copulation and oviposition can occur. Following their final molt, the newly emerged adults take their first flight at the first sunset after emergence. For at least two nights following emergence, both males and females will migrate an average distance of 40 km per night. After two nights, they will begin to respond to food stimuli, leading them to land and seek out reproductive opportunities in locations where food is abundant. The purpose of this migration is not fully understood, as young adults migrate regardless of food and mate availability. It has been hypothesized that these migrations are an adaptation to mixed agricultural and urban environments, in which there is high probability of both local habitat deterioration and finding equally suitable habitats nearby.

== Mating and reproduction ==
=== Reproductive cycle ===
The reproductive cycle of C. plorabunda is regulated by photoperiodic stimuli, with the reproductive period occurring under constant long-day conditions (13–14 hours of daylight or more). Throughout the reproductive period, females will lay several hundred small eggs, and larvae will emerge within 3–6 days. This larval stage typically lasts two to three weeks, with three instars taking place before the final cocoon and adult emergence, which occurs in 10–14 days.

At the end of the reproductive season, adults enter reproductive diapause when short-day conditions (12–13 hours or less of daylight) occur. The intensity of diapause is determined by the shortest day length below the critical photoperiod, meaning that shorter daylight causes longer periods of diapause. Within the species, the length of daylight that triggers diapause varies with geography. As such, populations in climates that are become cold earlier in the year will enter reproductive diapause earlier, while those in climates that remain warm for longer will continue reproducing for a longer period of time. For all C. plorabunda, the induction of diapause is characterized by a color shift from green to brown.

=== Oviposition ===
Within C. plorabunda, the patterns of egg-laying, sexual receptivity, and mating vary widely. On average, females have an oviposition length of ~64 days and lay an average of 780 eggs over their entire lifetime. The majority of these eggs are produced from the first copulation. At their peak productivity, females can oviposit ~40 eggs per day, and will become sexually receptive again once this productivity begins to decline.

=== Mating system ===
Both male and female C. plorabunda exhibit a polygynandrous mating system, seeking out multiple reproductive opportunities from different mates at approximately ~24 hour intervals. When copulation is initiated, it lasts for approximately 8–10 minutes in most cases of sexual reproduction. Males of the species undergo irreversible sperm depletion, however, making it that only the first two females will derive high fertilization potential from a given male. Despite males being unable to manufacture new sperm, they will mate with an average of 22-30 females during their lifetime.

Females copulate with an average of four males across their lifetimes. Female mate choice appears to play a role in determining which males are successful in their copulation attempts. Despite reproductive duets being completed successfully, females may suddenly reject males by lunging or biting. The reason for why certain males are rejected, even after duet completion, remains unknown.

=== Sexual communication ===
Chyrsoperla plorabunda males and females initiate copulation through identical substrate-borne vibrational mating songs. The songs consist of volleys produced by low-frequency abdominal vibrations with downward modulation, which are repeated with a regular period. They are relatively simple, with these single-volley repeat units serving as the unit of exchange between individuals.

While intersexual duets are monomorphic, intrasexual duets exhibit sexual dimorphism. Males engage with other males in fast duets that speed up and terminate suddenly. Females do not have the ability to perform this more rapid signaling pattern. These faster songs have been shown to ensure that sex recognition can take place quickly, as well as to serve as a determinant of mating success. Females will preferentially duet and mate with the winners of male-male duetting contests.

In addition to their role in initiating copulation, Chrysoperla mating songs also act as a mechanism of prezygotic behavioral isolation. Differences in songs function as preventative barriers to reproduction between song morphs that overlap in geographic range. Females do not respond to songs that are delivered at a rate that is too fast for them to duet, or that does not exactly match their own song structure. Males also do not respond to differences in song structure, but will respond to increasing speed with an attempt to initiate a male-male duetting competition. As such, male and females are equally likely to terminate a duet interaction if the signals do not match each other closely enough. This effectively isolates C. plorabunda from any other song morphs, as closely related species occupy adjacent but significantly different acoustic spaces.

The genetic basis of this song based speciation are two large genomic regions associated with mating song phenotype on chromosomes one and two. Compared to other autosomes, these chromosomes have lower rates of recombination, thus functioning to keep together the loci that are important to song phenotype and preference. It is likely that there are other loci of small effect related to volley period spread throughout the genome, mutations to which have resulted in the rapid speciation observed in the C. carnea complex.
