= Plutella haasi =

Scientific classification
- Domain: Eukaryota
- Kingdom: Animalia
- Phylum: Arthropoda
- Class: Insecta
- Order: Lepidoptera
- Family: Plutellidae
- Genus: Plutella
- Species: P. haasi

Binomial name
- Plutella haasi Staudinger, 1883

Species of moth

Plutella haasi is a species of moth belonging to the family Plutellidae.

It is native to Europe and Northern America.
