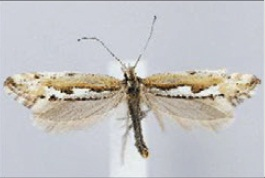

Scientific classification
- Domain: Eukaryota
- Kingdom: Animalia
- Phylum: Arthropoda
- Class: Insecta
- Order: Lepidoptera
- Family: Plutellidae
- Genus: Plutella
- Species: P. hyperboreella

Binomial name
- Plutella hyperboreella Strand, 1902

Synonyms
- Plutelloptera hyperboreella

= Plutella hyperboreella =

Species of moth

Plutella hyperboreella is a moth of the family Plutellidae. It is found in Finland, Norway, Sweden, arctic Russia and Canada (Nunavut, Northwest Territories and Québec).

The wingspan is 14–17 mm. Adults have been recorded on wing in July.

The larvae feed on Arabis alpina and Draba species in Europe.
