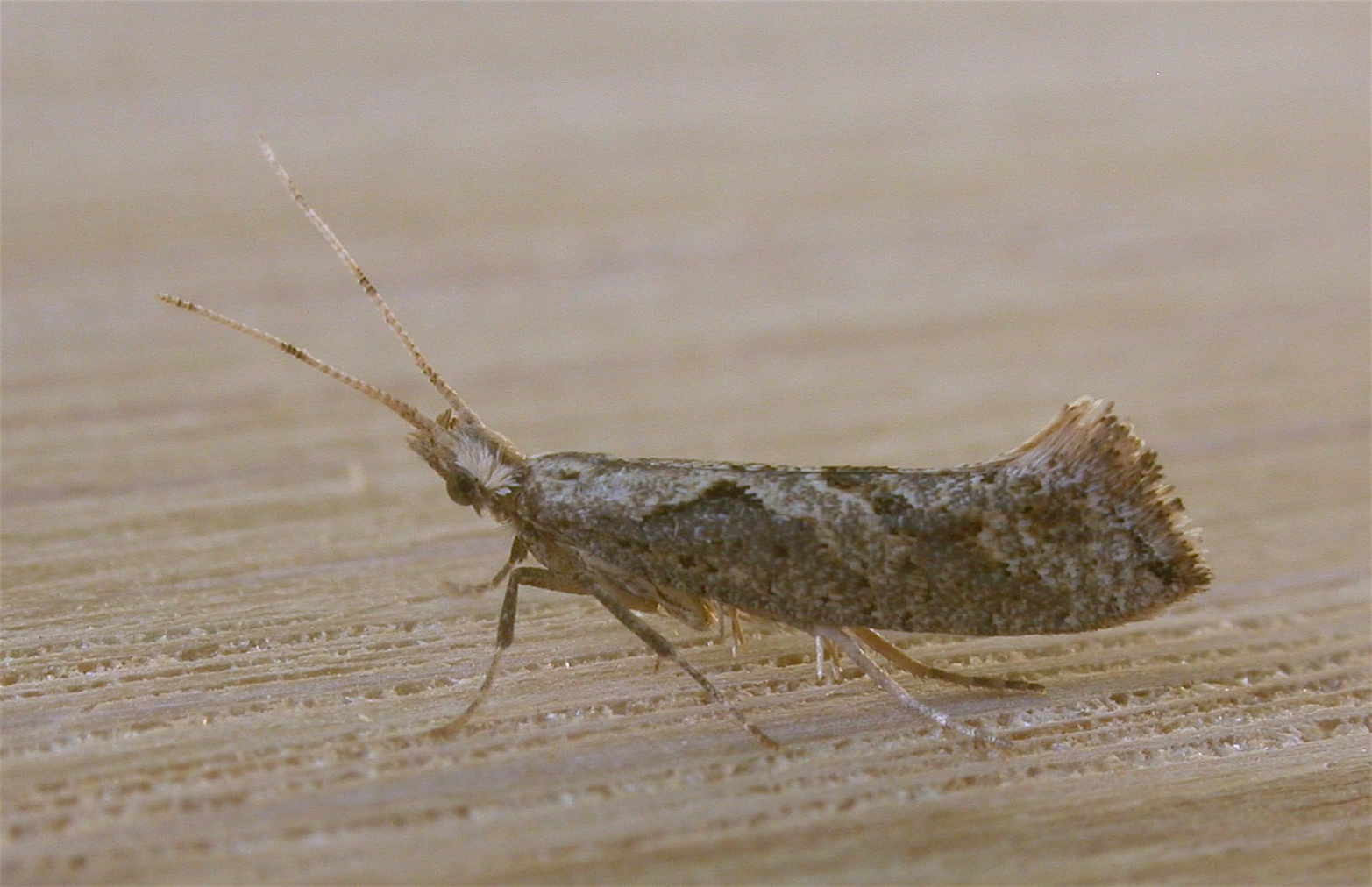

Scientific classification
- Kingdom: Animalia
- Phylum: Arthropoda
- Clade: Pancrustacea
- Class: Insecta
- Order: Lepidoptera
- Family: Plutellidae
- Genus: Leuroperna
- Species: L. sera

Binomial name
- Leuroperna sera (Meyrick, 1885)

Synonyms
- Caunaca sera Meyrick, 1886; Plutella sera (Meyrick, 1885)

= Leuroperna sera =

Species of moth

Leuroperna sera is a moth of the family Plutellidae first described by Edward Meyrick in 1885. It is found in Japan, Taiwan, Vietnam, Indonesia, India, Sri Lanka, Australia, and New Zealand.

== Description ==
The wingspan of the adult is 10 millimetres (0.39 in). Similar to sympatric moth Plutella xylostella, but can be distinguished by much broader wings and genitalia. The caterpillar is about 10 mm in maximum length. Head with numerous blackish-brown dots. Body green to yellowish tinged with a slender red or pale red dorsal, subdorsal, supraspiracular, subspiracular, and basal lines. Pupa very similar to above mentioned species, but with a pair of hooked setae and maxilla is always shorter than the mid-leg. Pupation is in an open net-like white cocoon on leaf underside. Caterpillars of the two species co-exist in the crop plants.

== Distribution ==
In New Zealand this species is regarded as a self-introduced resident and is found in the North Island and in the South Island down to Canterbury. It is regarded as relatively common.

== Habitat and hosts ==
In New Zealand they can be observed in a range of habitats including near the edges or clearing of native forest and in cultivated areas such as domestic gardens. The caterpillar is known to feed on economically valuable crucifers such as Brassica juncea, Brassica napus, cauliflower, cabbage, Chinese cabbage, radish, turnip and many other wild crucifers. In New Zealand it has been hypothesised that they are hosted by watercress as adults have been observed swarming over plants in this genus.

== Behaviour ==
Adults of this species can be observed on the wing all year round in the North Island of New Zealand but tend to be restricted to the summer months in the South Island. They are nocturnal and are attracted to light. When at rest adults hold their antennae in a forward v-shaped position.
