= Plutella capparidis =

Scientific classification
- Domain: Eukaryota
- Kingdom: Animalia
- Phylum: Arthropoda
- Class: Insecta
- Order: Lepidoptera
- Family: Plutellidae
- Genus: Plutella
- Species: P. capparidis

Binomial name
- Plutella capparidis Swezey, 1920

Species of moth

Plutella capparidis is a moth of the family Plutellidae endemic to the Hawaiian islands of Kauai and Oahu. It was first described by Otto Swezey in 1920.

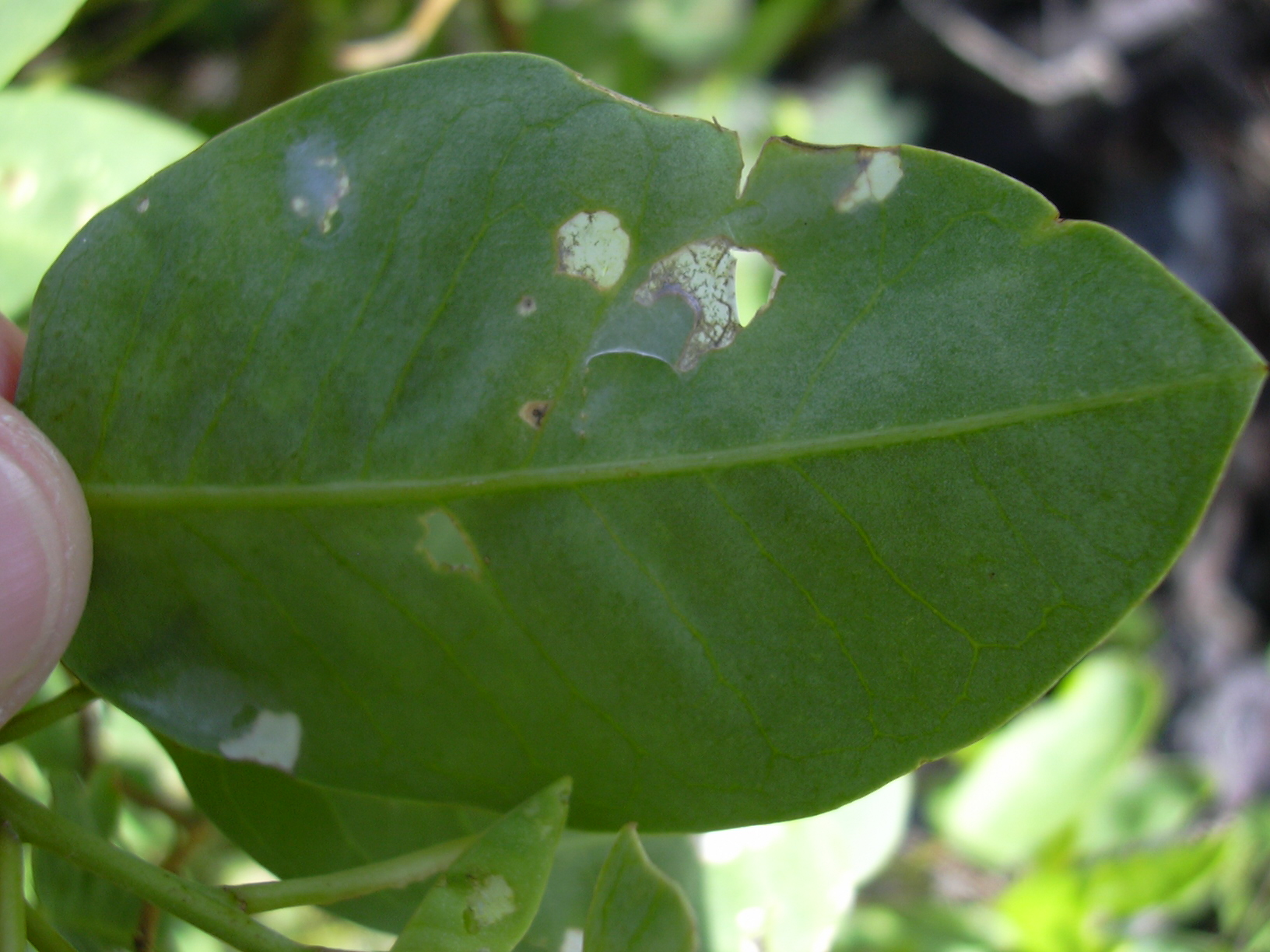
Plutella capparidis feeding damage to Capparis sandwichiana

The light green larvae feed on Capparis sandwichiana. They mostly feed on the surface of the leaves, eating one epidermis and the parenchyma and leaving the other epidermis, which shows as dead spots in the leaves. Occasionally, the larvae may mine within the leaf. Usually they are exposed, but sometimes covered by a slight web. The cocoon is made on the surface of the leaf.
