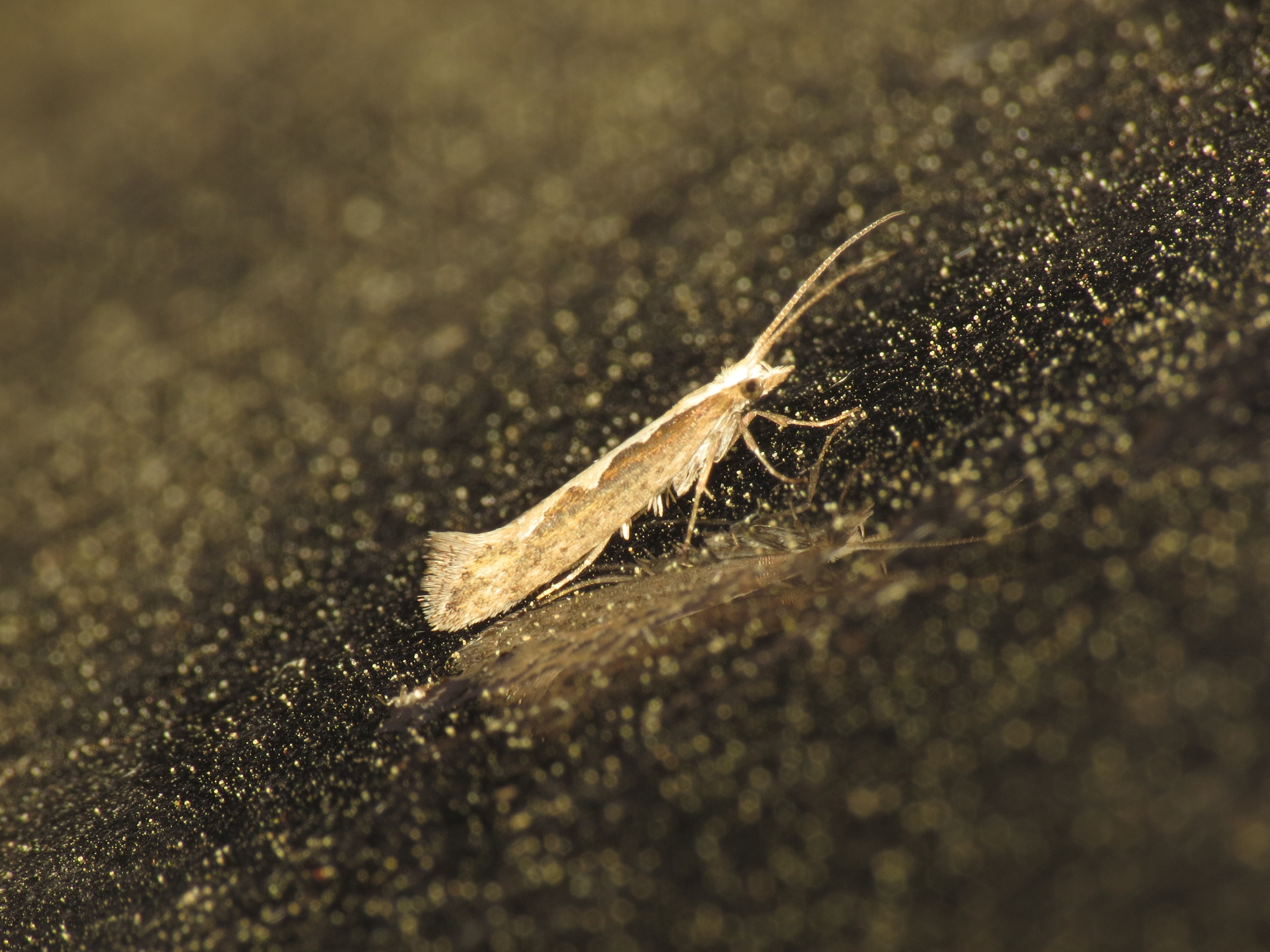
- Plutella xylostella

Scientific classification
- Domain: Eukaryota
- Kingdom: Animalia
- Phylum: Arthropoda
- Class: Insecta
- Order: Lepidoptera
- Family: Plutellidae
- Genus: Plutella; Schrank, 1802

Synonyms
- Anadetia Hubner 1825; Creagria Sodoffsky 1837; Euota Hubner 1825; Evota Agassiz 1847; Pseudoplutella Baraniak, 2007; Plutelloptera Baraniak, 2007

= Plutella =

Moth genus in family Plutellidae

Plutella is a genus of moths in the family Plutellidae.

== Species ==
- Plutella acrodelta Meyrick, 1931
- Plutella albidorsella Walsingham, 1881
- Plutella antiphona Meyrick, 1901
- Plutella armoraciae Busck, 1912
- Plutella australiana Landry & Hebert, 2013
- Plutella capparidis Swezey, 1920
- Plutella culminata Meyrick, 1931
- Plutella deltodoma Meyrick, 1931
- Plutella diluta Meyrick, 1931
- Plutella geniatella Zeller, 1839
- Plutella haasi Staudinger, 1883
- Plutella hyperboreella Strand, 1902
- Plutella kahakaha Sattler & Robinson, 2001
- Plutella mariae Rebel, 1823
- Plutella nephelaegis Meyrick, 1931
- Plutella noholio Sattler & Robinson, 2001
- Plutella notabilis Busck, 1904
- Plutella omissa Walsingham, 1889
- Plutella polaris Zeller, 1880
- Plutella porrectella (Linnaeus, 1758)
- Plutella psammochroa Meyrick, 1885
- Plutella rectivittella Zeller, 1877
- Plutella xylostella (Linnaeus, 1758)
