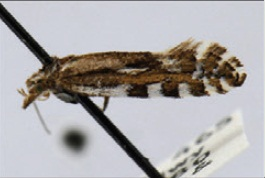

Scientific classification
- Domain: Eukaryota
- Kingdom: Animalia
- Phylum: Arthropoda
- Class: Insecta
- Order: Lepidoptera
- Family: Plutellidae
- Genus: Plutella
- Species: P. notabilis

Binomial name
- Plutella notabilis Busck, 1904

= Plutella notabilis =

Species of moth

Plutella notabilis is a moth of the family Plutellidae. It is found in western North America, including Washington and Yukon Territory.
