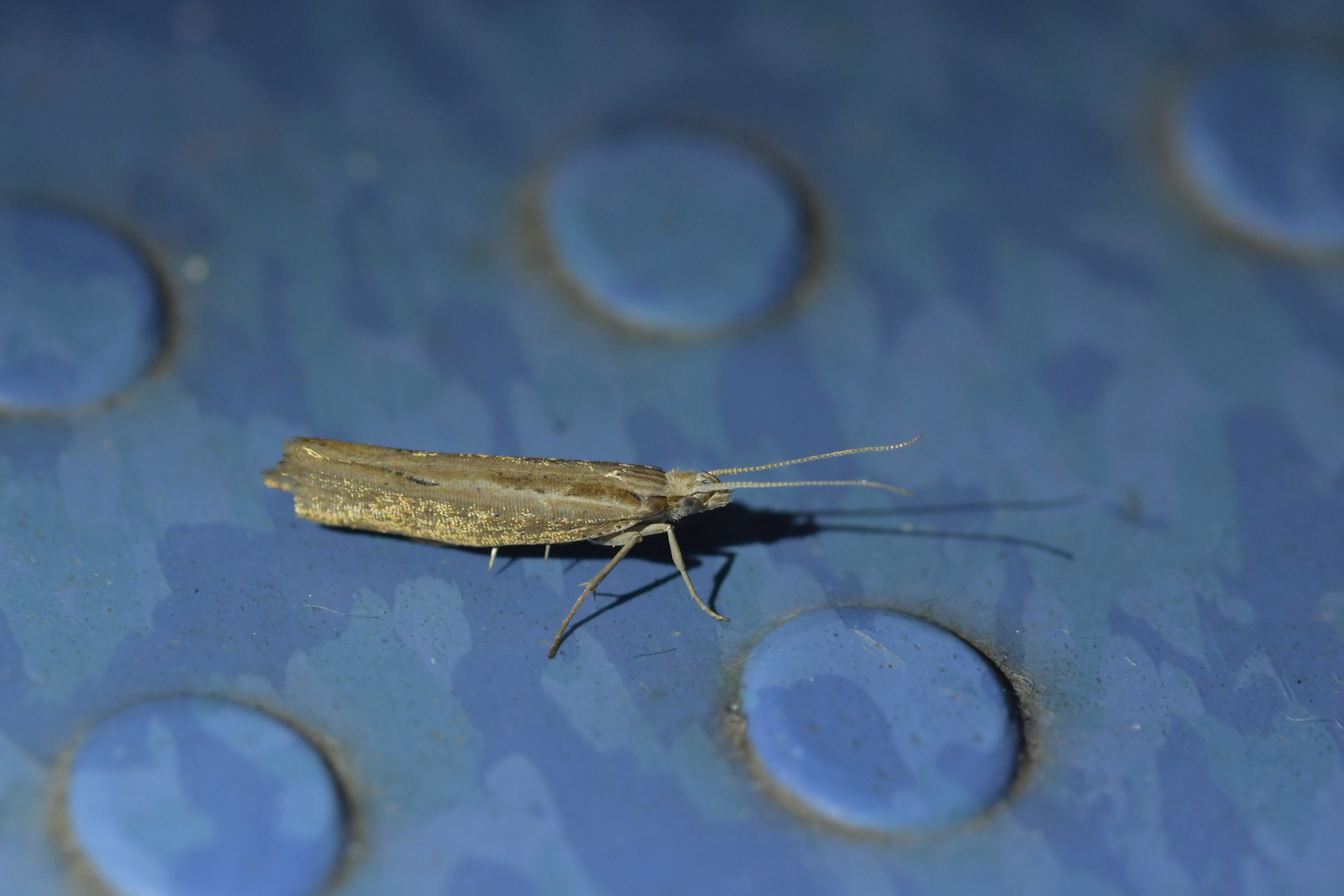

Scientific classification
- Kingdom: Animalia
- Phylum: Arthropoda
- Class: Insecta
- Order: Lepidoptera
- Family: Plutellidae
- Genus: Plutella
- Species: P. psammochroa

Binomial name
- Plutella psammochroa Meyrick, 1885

= Plutella psammochroa =

Species of moth

Plutella psammochroa is a moth of the family Plutellidae first described by Edward Meyrick in 1885. It is found in New Zealand. The classification of this moth within the genus Plutella is regarded as unsatisfactory and in need of revision. As such, this species is currently also known as Plutella (s.l.) psammochroa.
