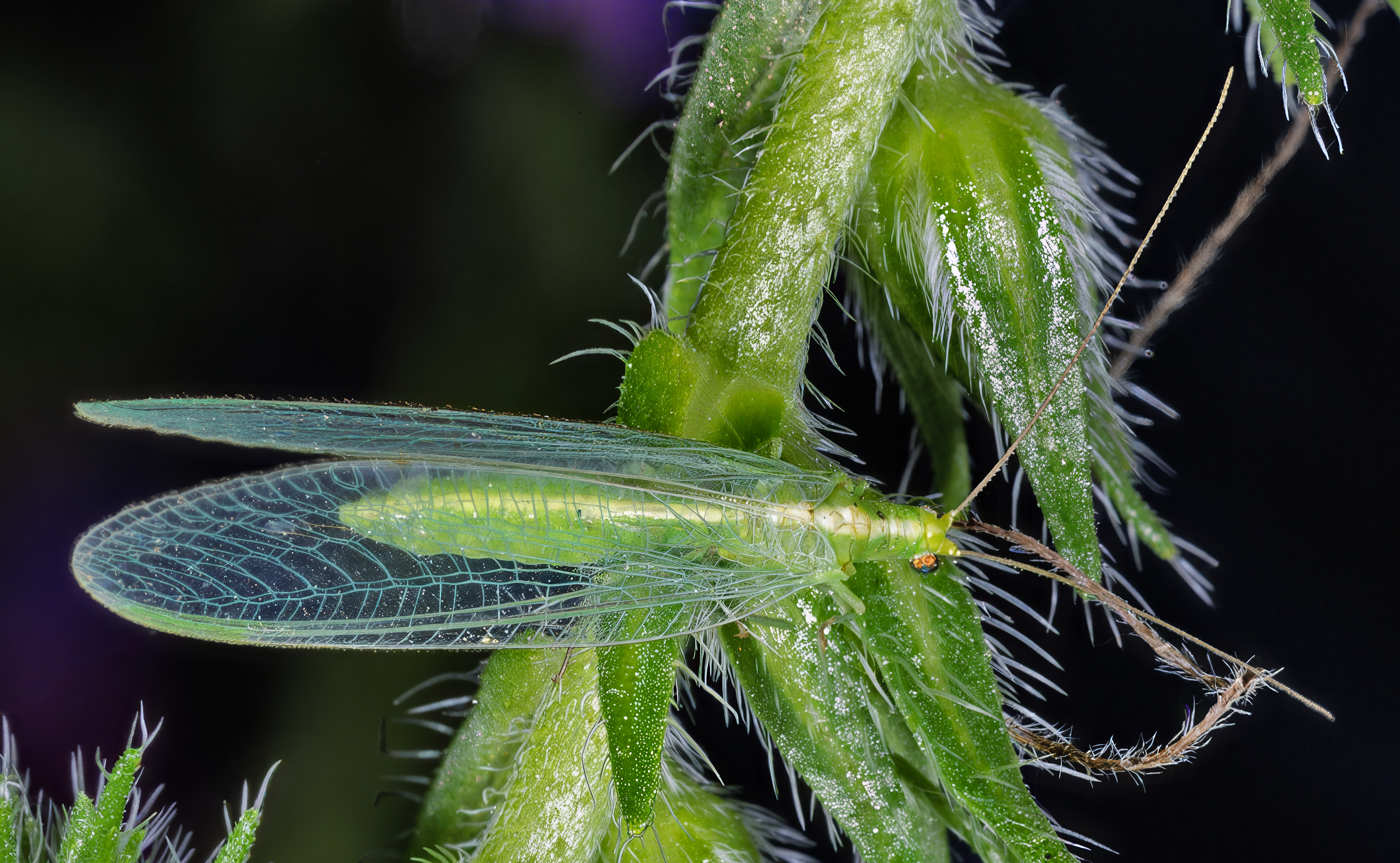
- Chrysoperla carnea

Scientific classification
- Kingdom: Animalia
- Phylum: Arthropoda
- Clade: Pancrustacea
- Class: Insecta
- Order: Neuroptera
- Family: Chrysopidae
- Genus: Chrysoperla
- Species: C. carnea

Binomial name
- Chrysoperla carnea (Stephens, 1836)

Synonyms
- Chrysoperla carneia; Chrysoperla carnes

Audio
- Sound

= Chrysoperla carnea =

Species of insect

Chrysoperla carnea, one of the species of common green lacewing, is an insect in the Chrysopidae family. Although the adults feed on nectar, pollen and aphid honeydew, the larvae are active predators and feed on aphids and other small insects. It has been used in the biological control of insect pests on crops.

Chrysoperla carnea was originally considered to be a single species with a holarctic distribution but it has now been shown to be a complex of many cryptic, sibling subspecies. These are indistinguishable from each other morphologically but can be recognised by variations in the vibrational songs the insects use to communicate with each other, which they especially do during courtship.

== Description ==
The green lacewing eggs are oval and secured to the plant by long slender stalks. They are pale green when first laid but become gray later. The larvae are about one millimetre long when they first hatch. They are light brown to cream coloured, often with markings, and have been compared in appearance to small alligators, crawling actively around in search of prey. They have a pair of pincer-like mandibles on their head with which they grasp their prey, sometimes lifting the victim off the leaf surface to prevent its escape. The larvae inject enzymes into the bodies of their victims which digest the internal organs, after which they suck out the liquidated body fluids. The larvae grow to about eight millimetres long before they spin circular cocoons and pupate.

Adult green lacewings, with a main body length of around 11-12 mm, are a pale green colour with long, threadlike antennae. They have four wings, and golden coloured compound eyes.

They are weak fliers and have a fluttery form of flight. They are often seen during the evenings and at night when they are attracted by lights. The high green sensitivity of the superposition eyes allows the green lacewings to recognize fresh green leaves that they use to find honey dew produced by aphids, a site for egglaying and a resting place.

== Distribution and habitat ==
Chrysoperla carnea is a widespread European species. They are often found in hedgerows and woodland.

Due to taxonomic revisions to the genus, in particular the Chrysoperla carnea species group, the exact geographic bounds of the species remain in question. As of 2009, two of the primary candidates for the true C. carnea are designated as Cc2 ("slow motorboat") and Cc4 ("motorboat"). Cc2 is the more restricted of the two candidates, only extending from central Spain north to England and east to Greece and Hungary. Cc4 is more widespread, ranging from the Southern Alps to the north through the United Kingdom and into the southern portion Fennoscandia and to the east to western or central Russia. Both candidates also differ in terms of habitat, with Cc2 being restricted to warmer elevations of below 1,000 meters whereas Cc4 is more tolerant of the cold and ranges into elevations above 1,000 meters.

== Life cycle ==
The green lacewing adults overwinter buried in leaf litter at the edge of fields or other rough places, emerging when the weather warms up in spring. Each female lacewing lays several hundred small eggs at the rate of two to five per day, choosing concealed spots underneath leaves or on shoots near potential prey. The eggs are normally laid during the hours of darkness.

The larvae hatch in three to six days, eat voraciously and moult three times as they grow. They feed not only on aphids but also on many other types of insects such as thrips, mites, whiteflies, and lepidopteran eggs.

After two to three weeks, the mature larvae secrete silk and build round, parchment-like cocoons in concealed positions on plants. From these, the adults emerge eleven to thirteen days later. The length of the life cycle (under 4 weeks in summer conditions) is greatly influenced by the temperature and there may be several generations each year under favourable conditions.

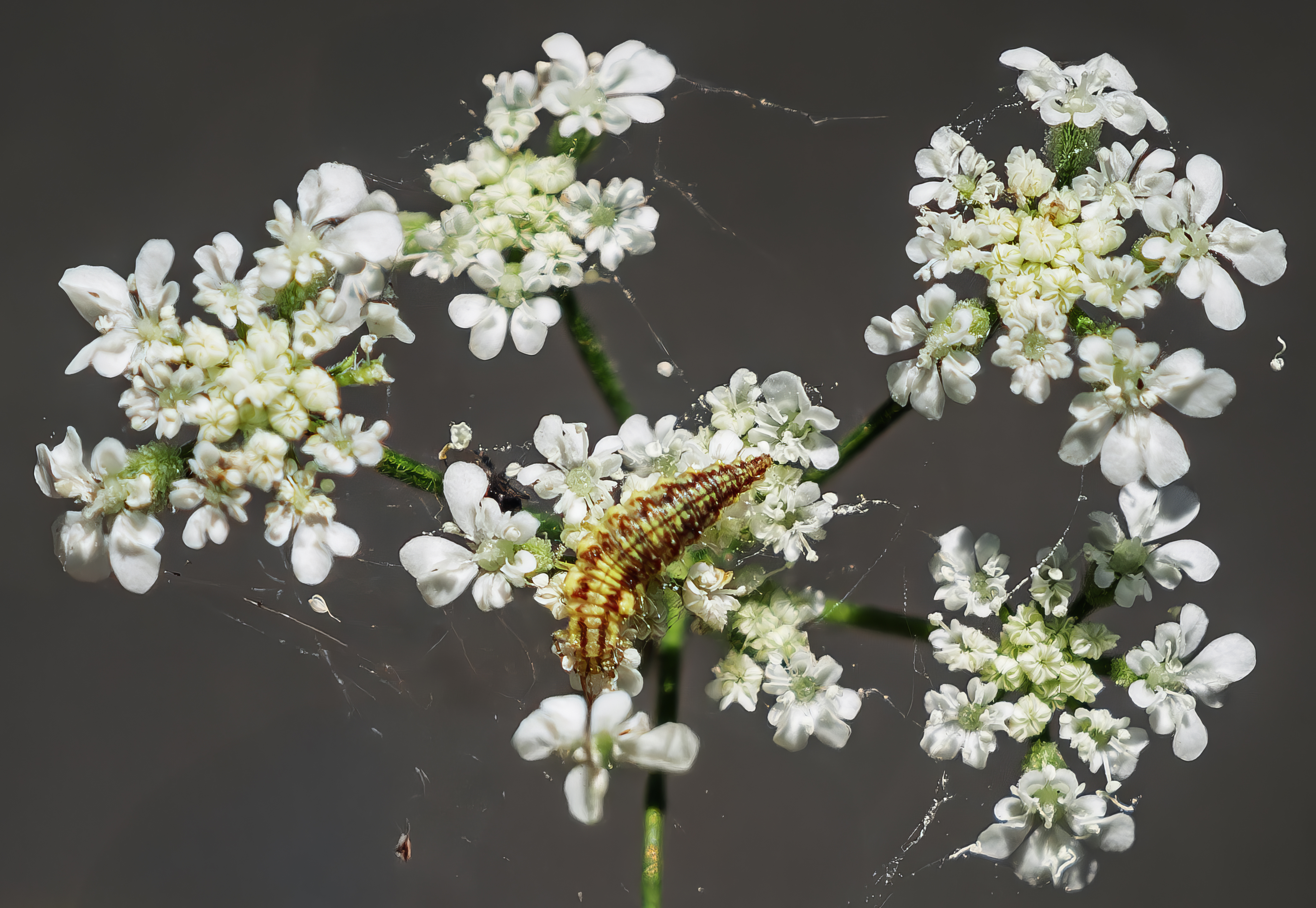
Larva of Chrysoperla carnea on Torilis arvensis

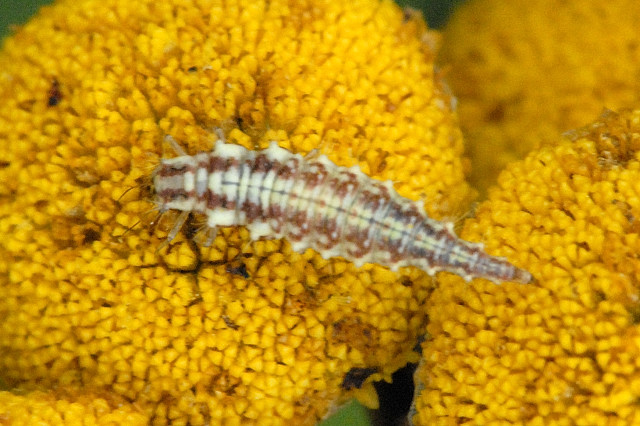
Chrysoperla carnea larva photographed in Belgium

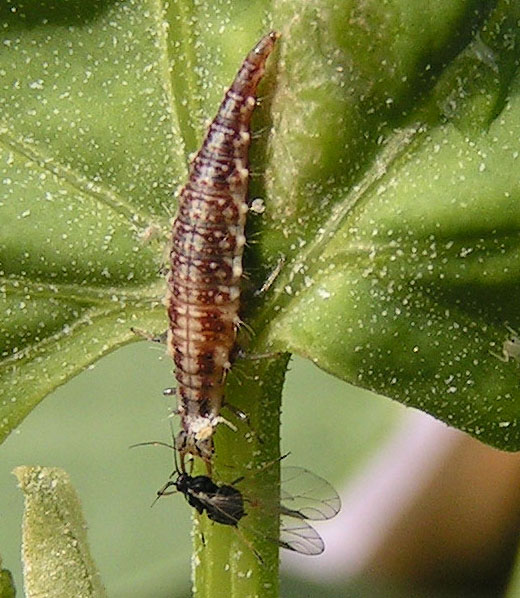
A larva with prey

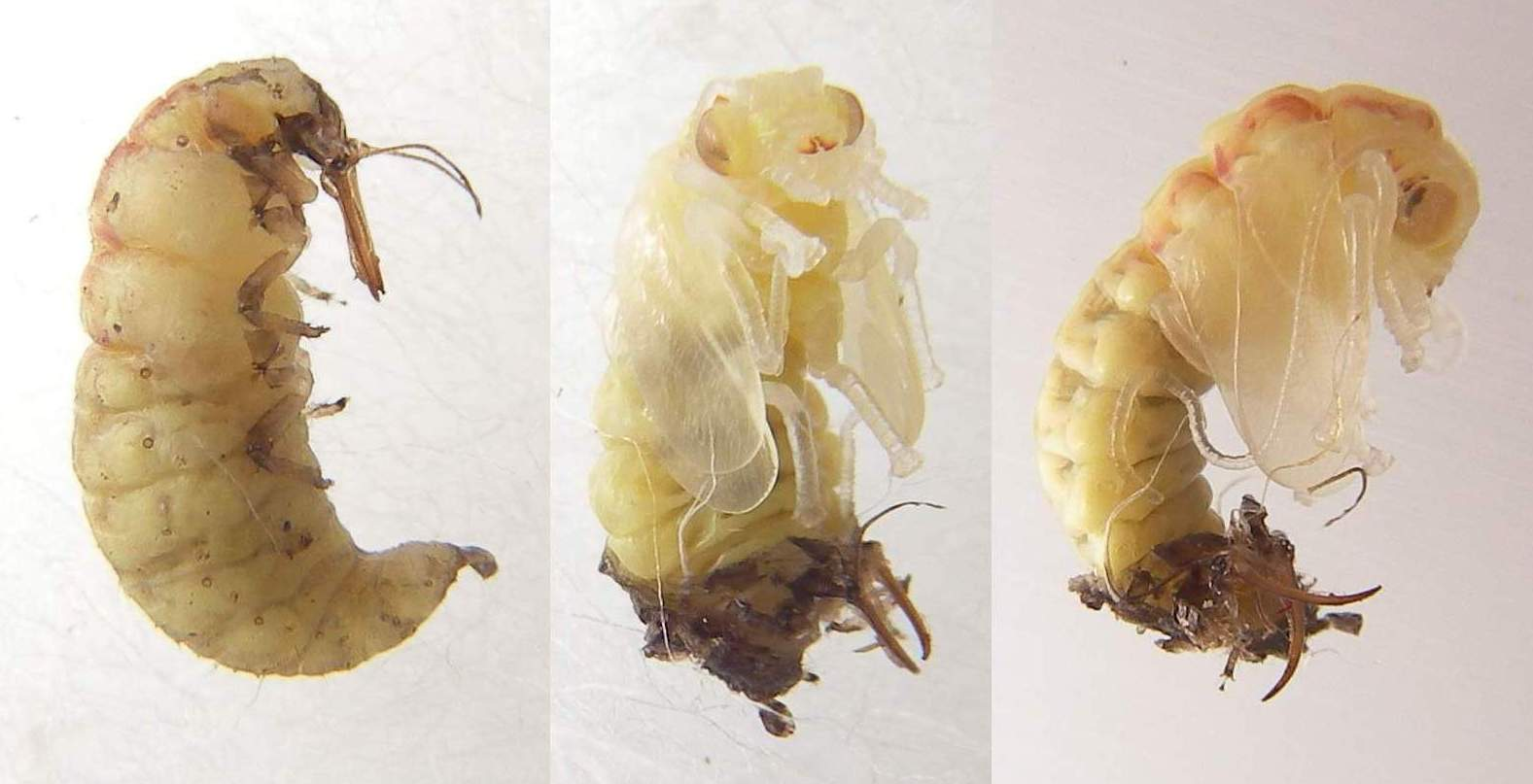
Left: Pre-pupa. Centre and Right: emerging from pupa

Adult resting on a leaf

Adult on a Privet flower

Adult on tree bark

== Biological control ==
Chrysoperla carnea adults eat pollen and honeydew and are not predatory, but the larvae have been recorded as feeding on seventy different prey species in five insect orders. The prey are mostly from the order Hemiptera and are predominantly aphids on low growing vegetation. On crops, the larvae have been reported as attacking several species of aphids, red spider mites, thrips, whitefly, the eggs of leafhoppers, leaf miners, psyllids, small moths and caterpillars, beetle larvae and the tobacco budworm. They are considered to be important predators of the long-tailed mealybug under glass. C. carnea occurs naturally in many growing regions of the Northern Hemisphere. It is considered an important aphid predator in cotton crops in Russia and Egypt, sugar beet in Germany and vineyards in Europe. It has been found to be effective at controlling the cotton whitefly, Bemisia tabaci, in cotton crops in Pakistan. The presence of the larvae on the foliage was found to inhibit visitation and oviposition by B. tabaci which suggests the larvae may produce a volatile semiochemical which repels the whitefly.

Although the larvae are effective as biological control agents, in open air environments the adult lacewings tend to disperse widely. They may remain in the original release location if they have sources of nectar, pollen or honeydew to feed on in the general vicinity. Commercial supplies of related species, usually eggs, are available from many outlets in North America. However, no true C. carnea occurs in North America.

When attempts were made to introduce the species into India, and New Zealand between the 1920s and 1970s, the lacewings failed to become established, perhaps because of the absence of certain yeast symbionts necessary to their development which were absent from their new environments.
