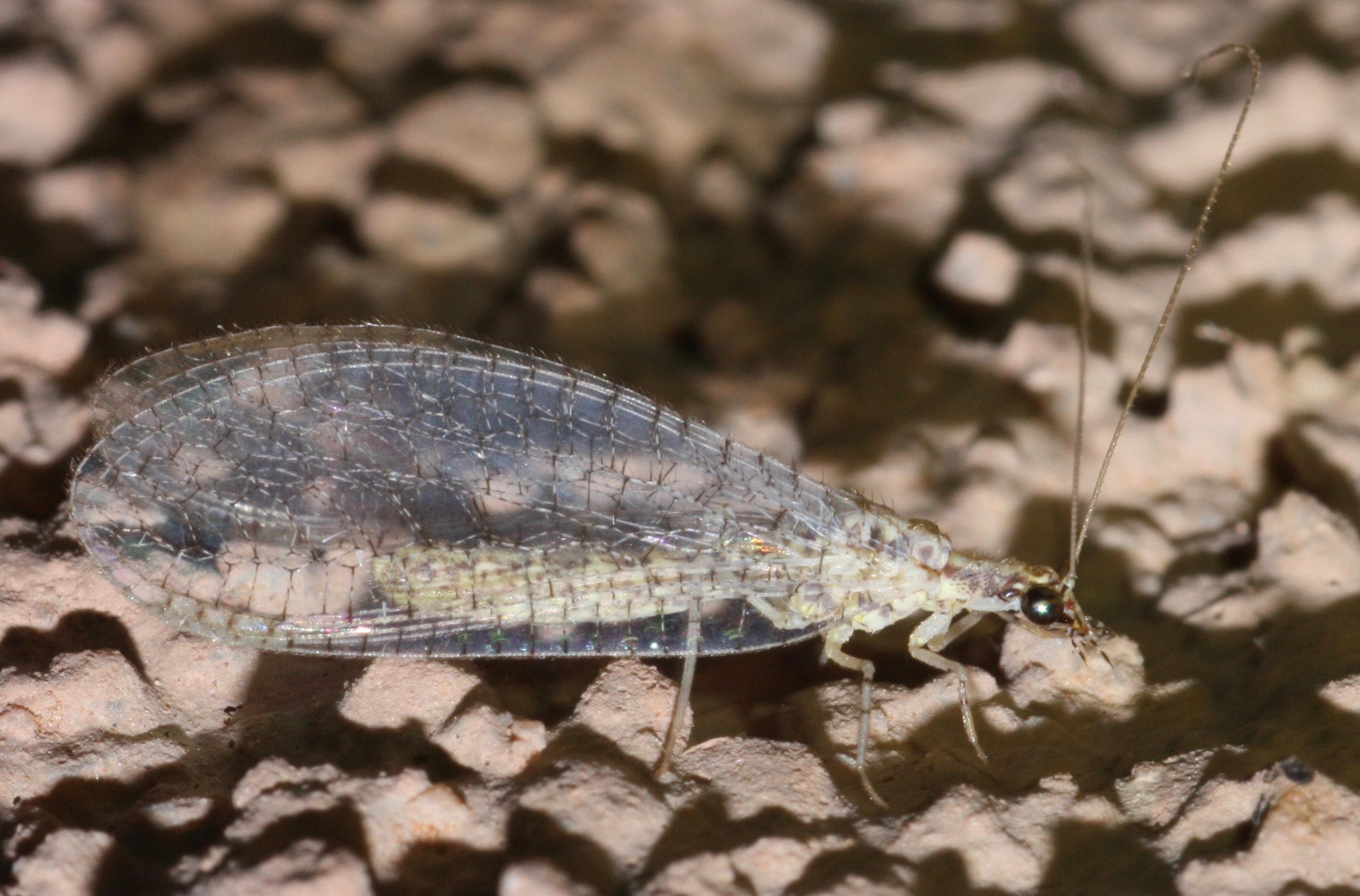

Scientific classification
- Domain: Eukaryota
- Kingdom: Animalia
- Phylum: Arthropoda
- Class: Insecta
- Order: Neuroptera
- Family: Chrysopidae
- Tribe: Chrysopini
- Genus: Eremochrysa
- Species: E. tibialis

Binomial name
- Eremochrysa tibialis Banks, 1950

= Eremochrysa tibialis =

Species of lacewing

Eremochrysa tibialis is a species of green lacewing in the family Chrysopidae.
