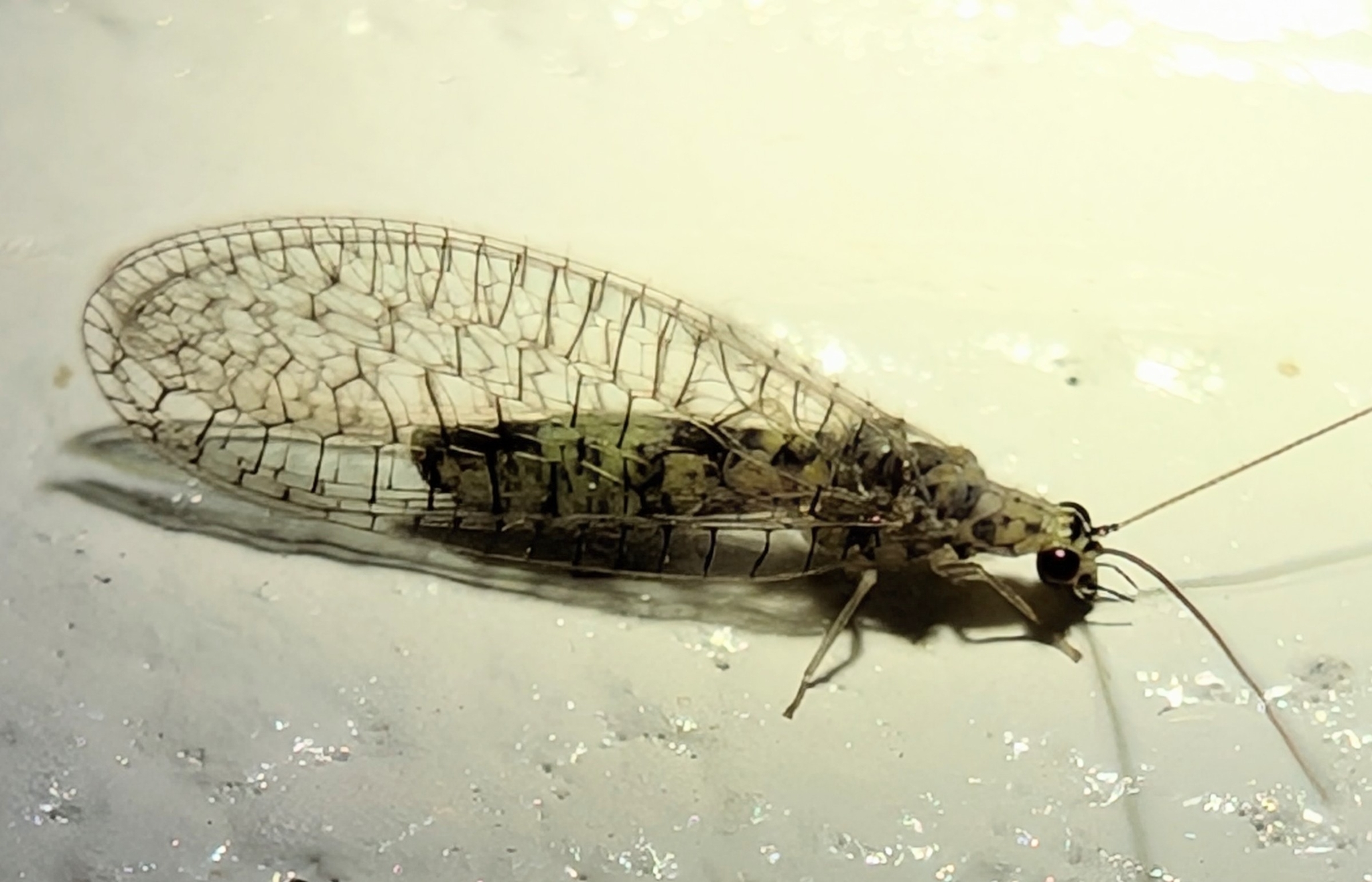

Scientific classification
- Kingdom: Animalia
- Phylum: Arthropoda
- Clade: Pancrustacea
- Class: Insecta
- Order: Neuroptera
- Family: Chrysopidae
- Tribe: Chrysopini
- Genus: Eremochrysa
- Species: E. canadensis

Binomial name
- Eremochrysa canadensis (Banks, 1911)

= Eremochrysa canadensis =

Species of lacewing

Eremochrysa canadensis is a species of green lacewing in the family Chrysopidae. It is found in North America.
