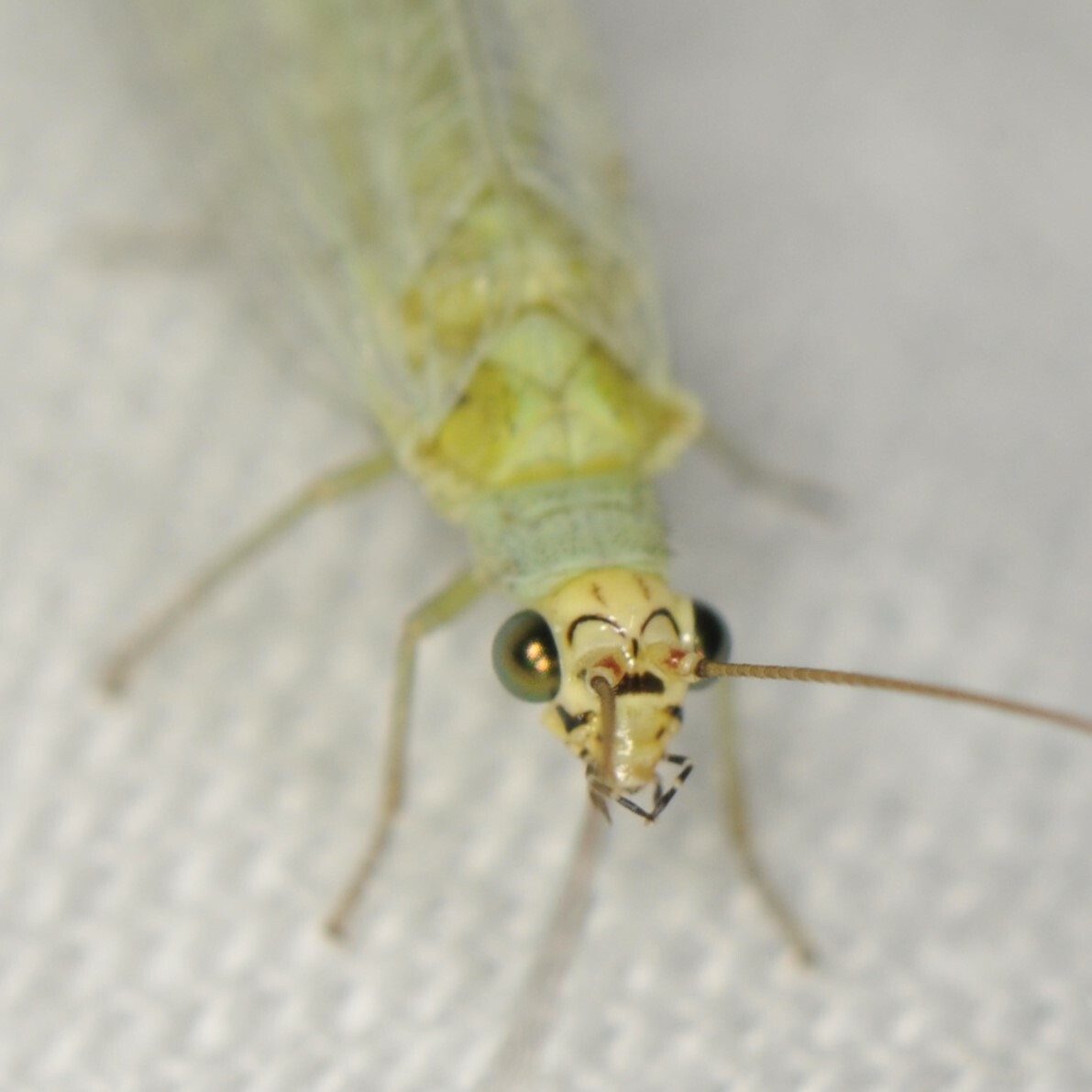

Scientific classification
- Domain: Eukaryota
- Kingdom: Animalia
- Phylum: Arthropoda
- Class: Insecta
- Order: Neuroptera
- Family: Chrysopidae
- Genus: Eremochrysa
- Species: E. pallida

Binomial name
- Eremochrysa pallida (Banks, 1911)

= Eremochrysa pallida =

Species of lacewing

Eremochrysa pallida is a species of green lacewing in the family Chrysopidae. It is found in the western United States.
