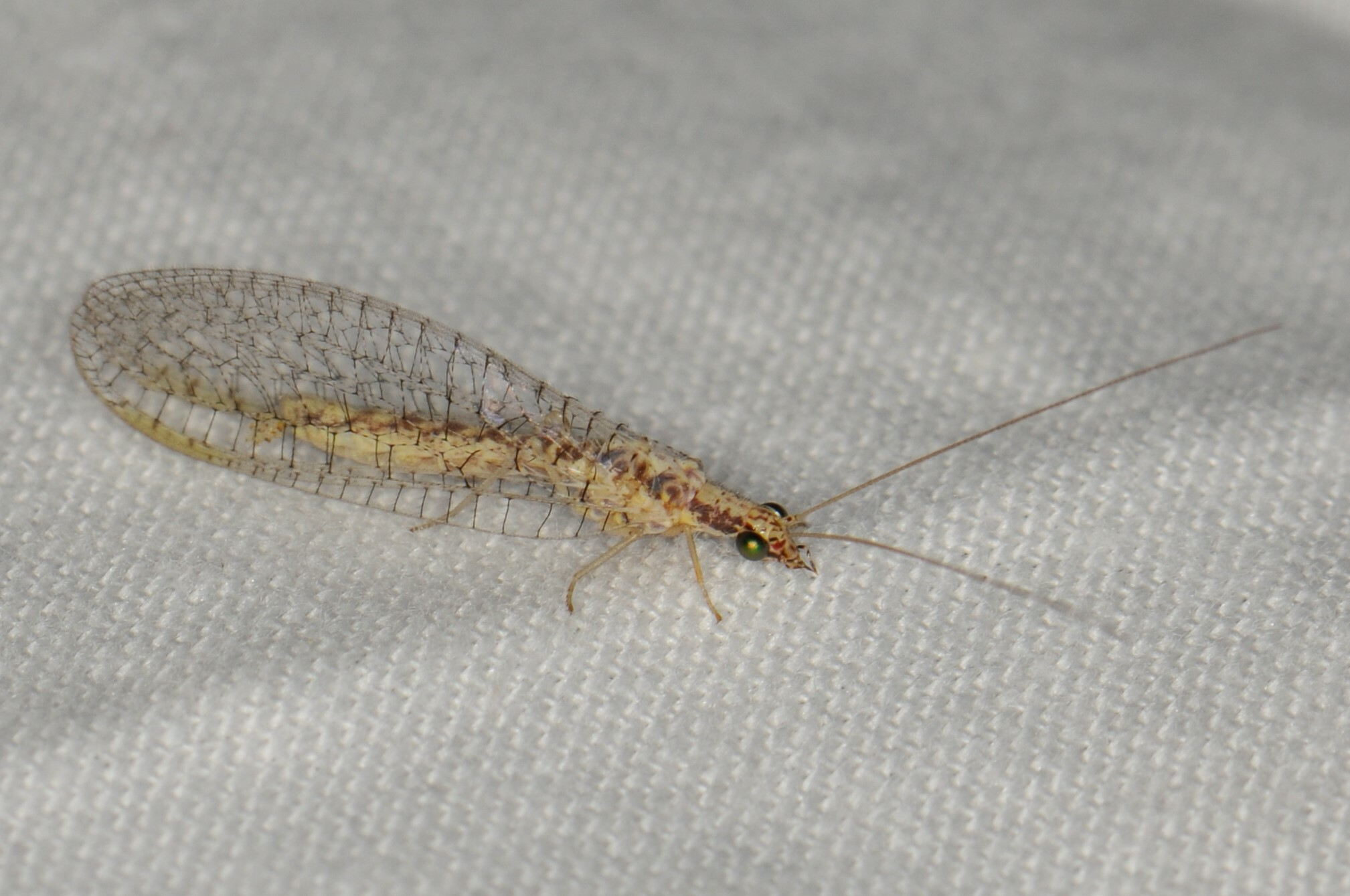
- Eremochrysa (Eremochrysa) punctinervis

Scientific classification
- Kingdom: Animalia
- Phylum: Arthropoda
- Clade: Pancrustacea
- Class: Insecta
- Order: Neuroptera
- Family: Chrysopidae
- Subfamily: Chrysopinae
- Tribe: Chrysopini
- Genus: Eremochrysa; Banks, 1903

= Eremochrysa =

Genus of lacewings

Eremochrysa is a genus of shadow lacewings belonging to the family Chrysopidae. There are currently 18 described species in Eremochrysa.

== Species ==
=== Subgenus Chrysopiella Banks, 1911 ===
- Eremochrysa brevisetosa (Adams & Garland, 1981)
- Eremochrysa minora (Banks, 1935)
- Eremochrysa pallida (Banks, 1911)
- Eremochrysa sabulosa (Banks, 1897)

=== Subgenus Eremochrysa Banks, 1903 ===
- Eremochrysa altilis Banks, 1950
- Eremochrysa californica Banks, 1905
- Eremochrysa canadensis (Banks, 1911)
- Eremochrysa digueti Navás, 1911
- Eremochrysa fraterna (Banks, 1897)
- Eremochrysa hageni (Banks, 1903)
- Eremochrysa israeli Alayo, 1968
- Eremochrysa pima Banks, 1950
- Eremochrysa pumilis Banks, 1950
- Eremochrysa punctinervis (McLachlan, 1869)
- Eremochrysa rufifrons Banks, 1950
- Eremochrysa spilota Banks, 1950
- Eremochrysa tibialis Banks, 1950
- Eremochrysa yosemite Banks, 1950

== Gallery ==
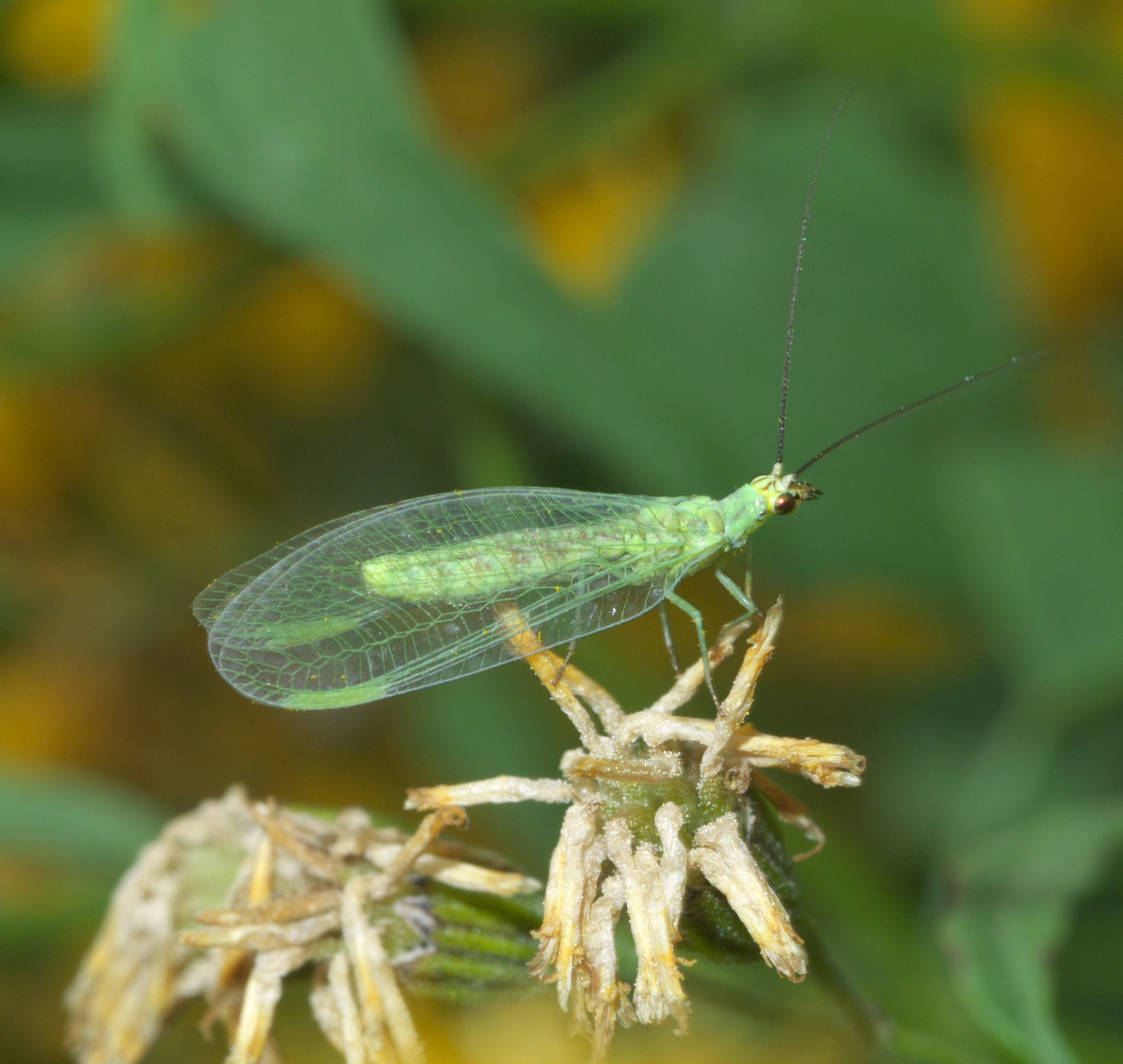
Eremochrysa (Chrysopiella) minora

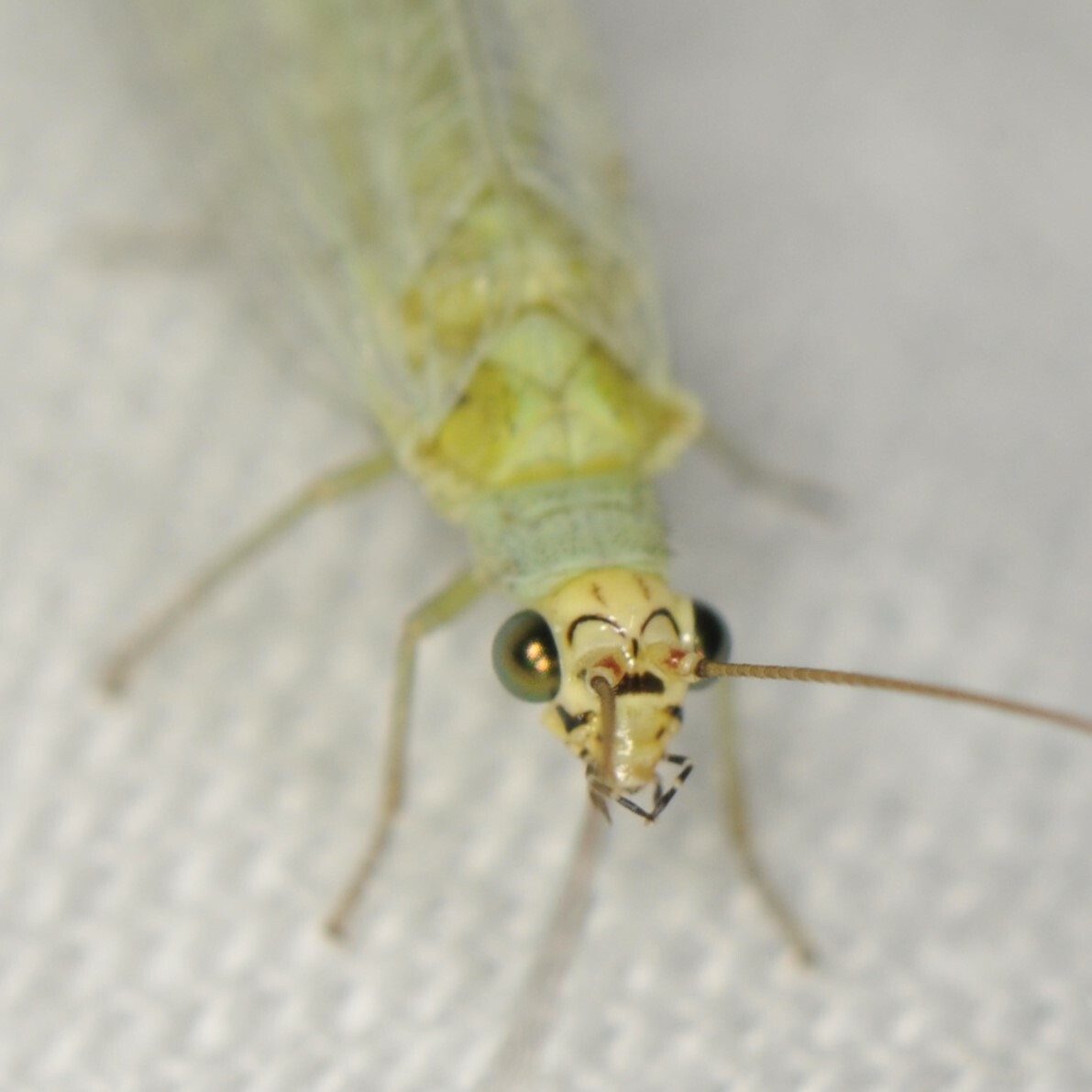
Eremochrysa (Chrysopiella) pallida

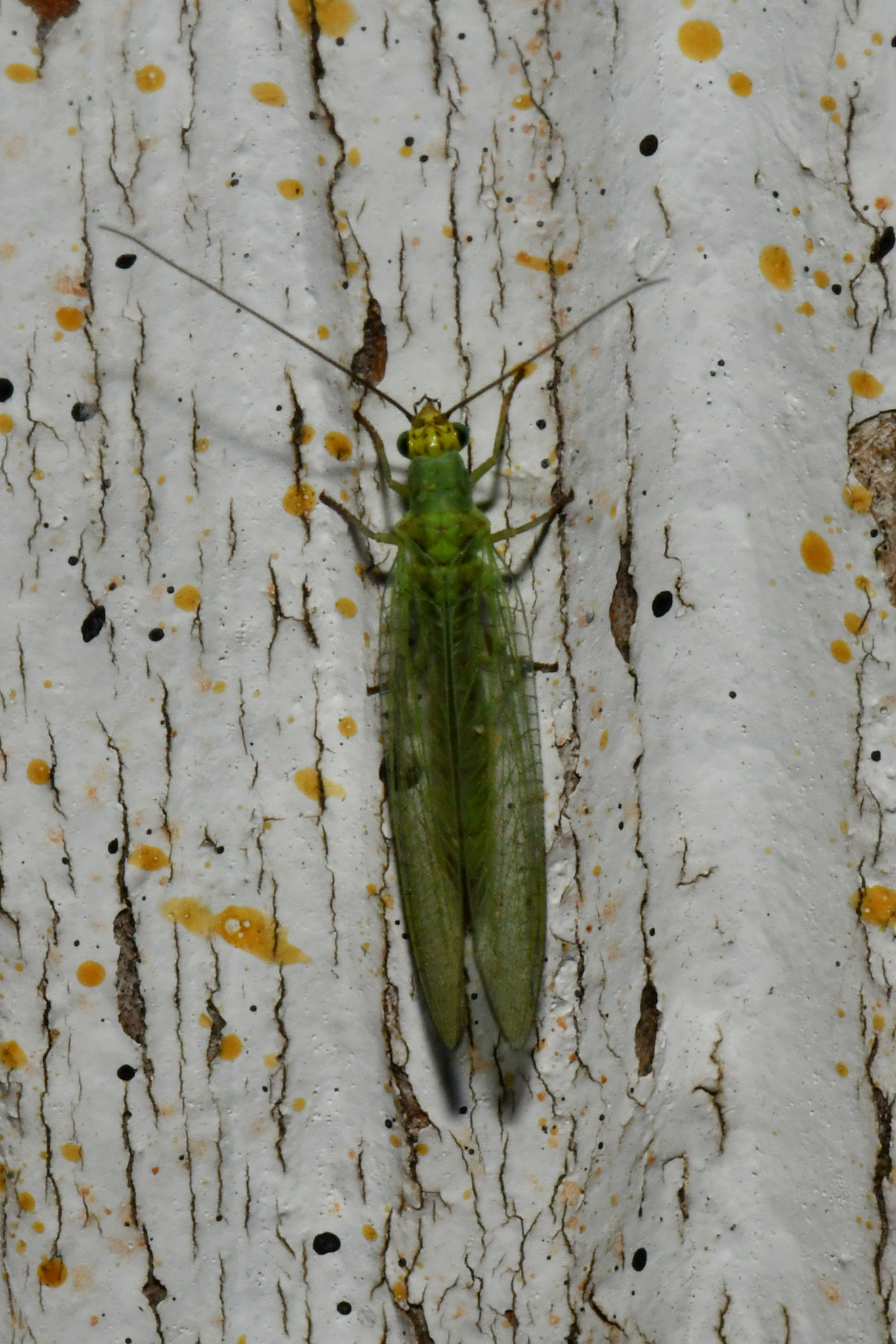
Eremochrysa (Chrysopiella) sabulosa

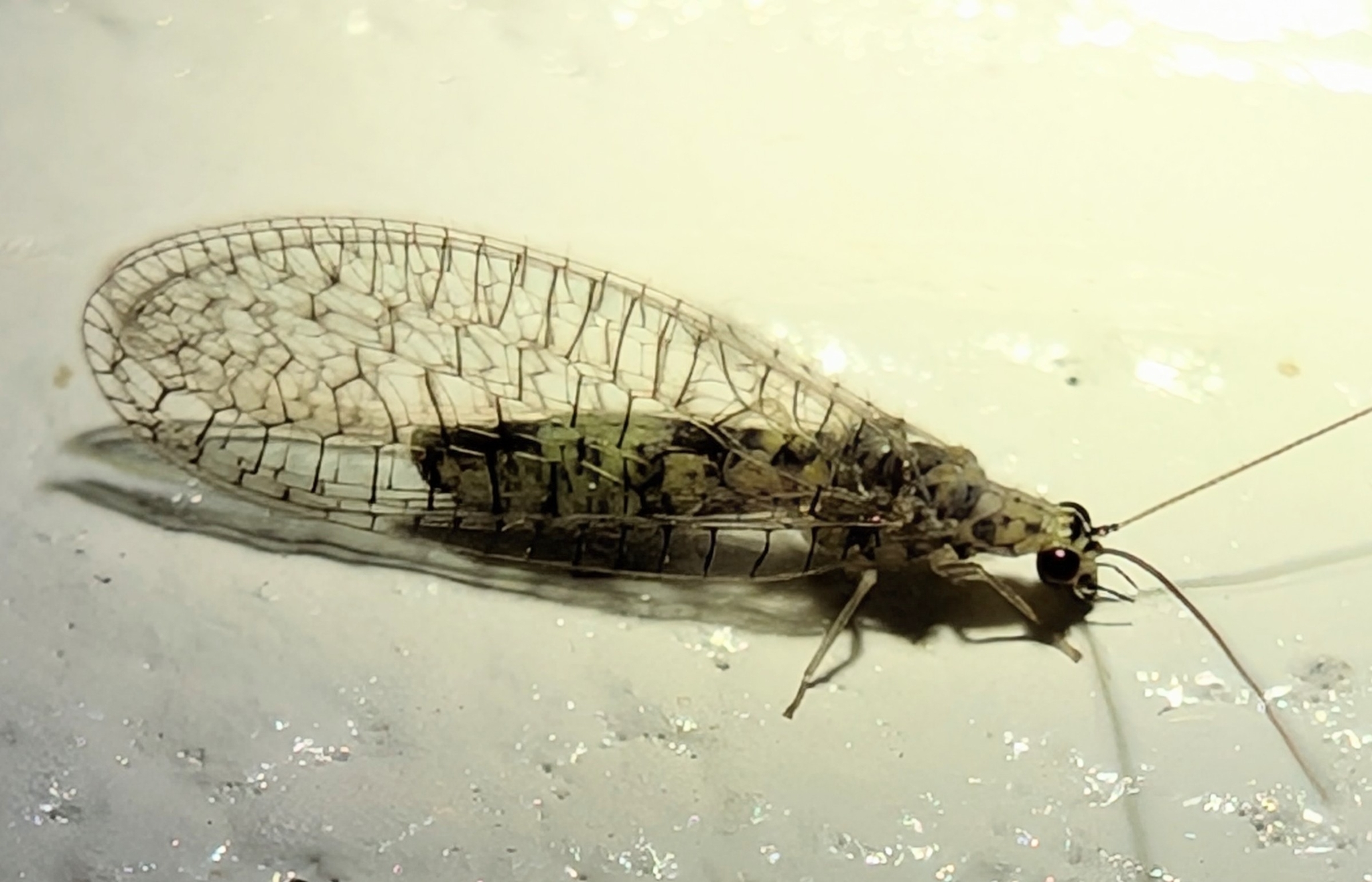
Eremochrysa (Eremochrysa) canadensis

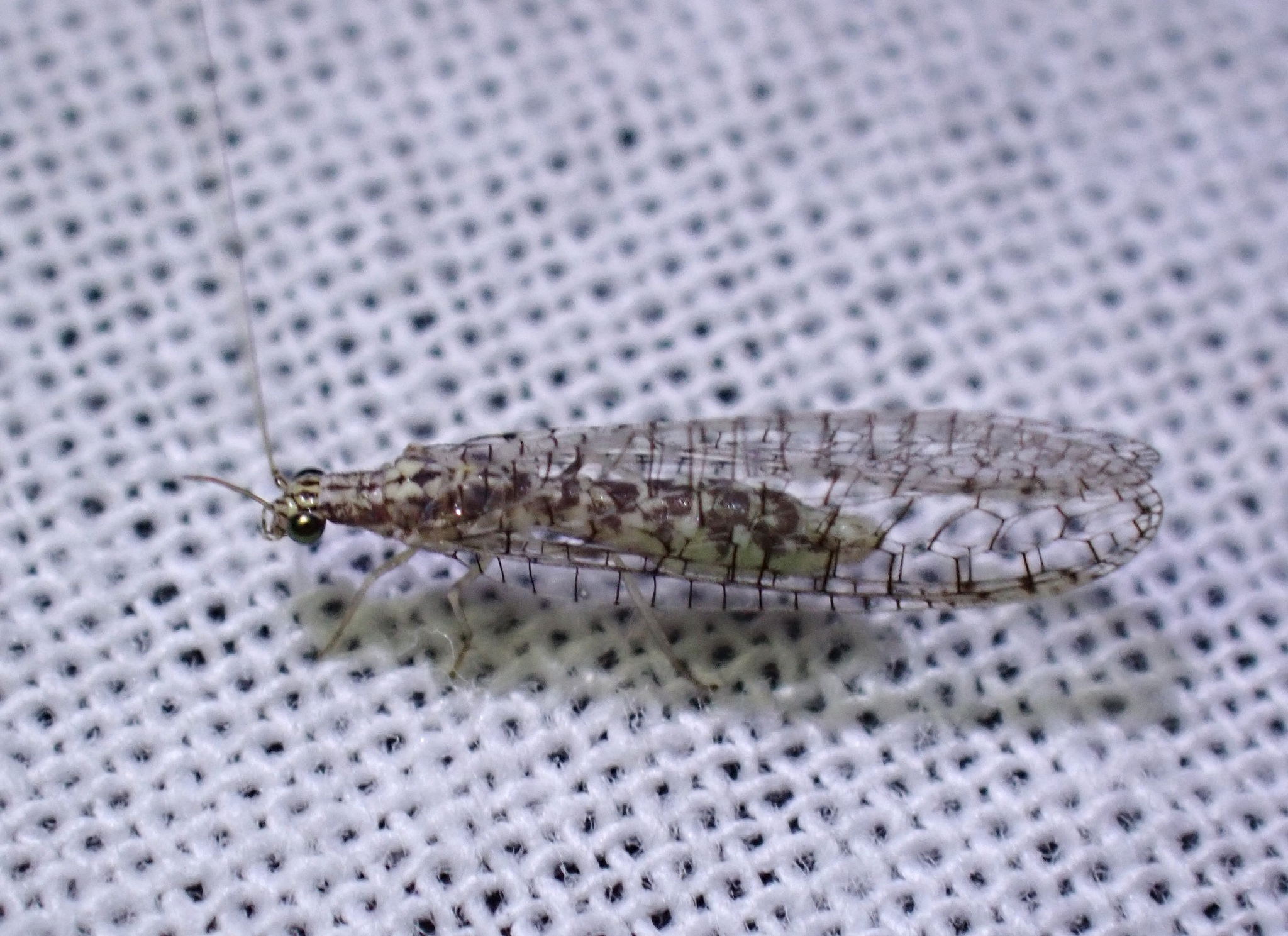
Eremochrysa (Eremochrysa) fraterna

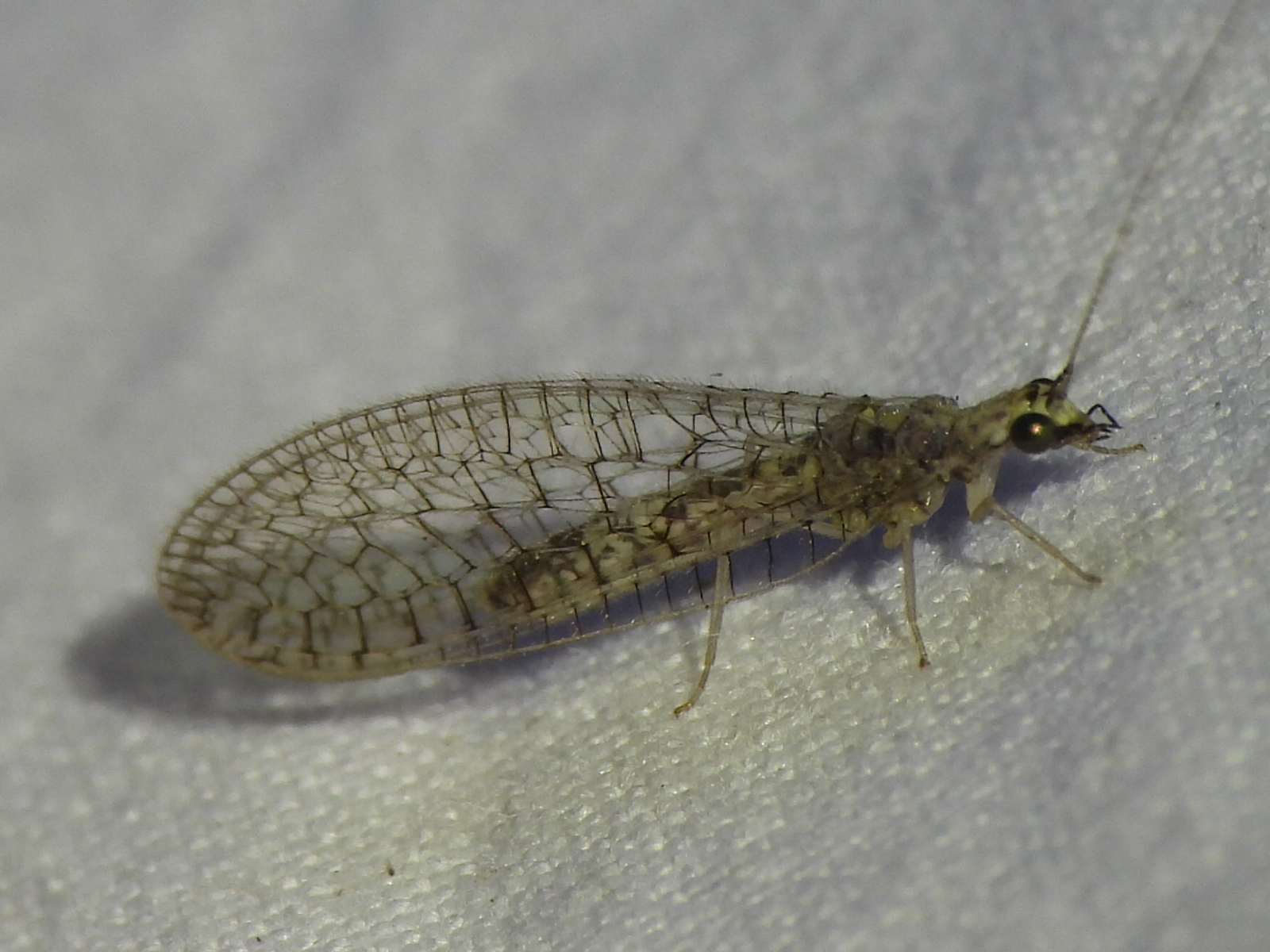
Eremochrysa (Eremochrysa) hageni

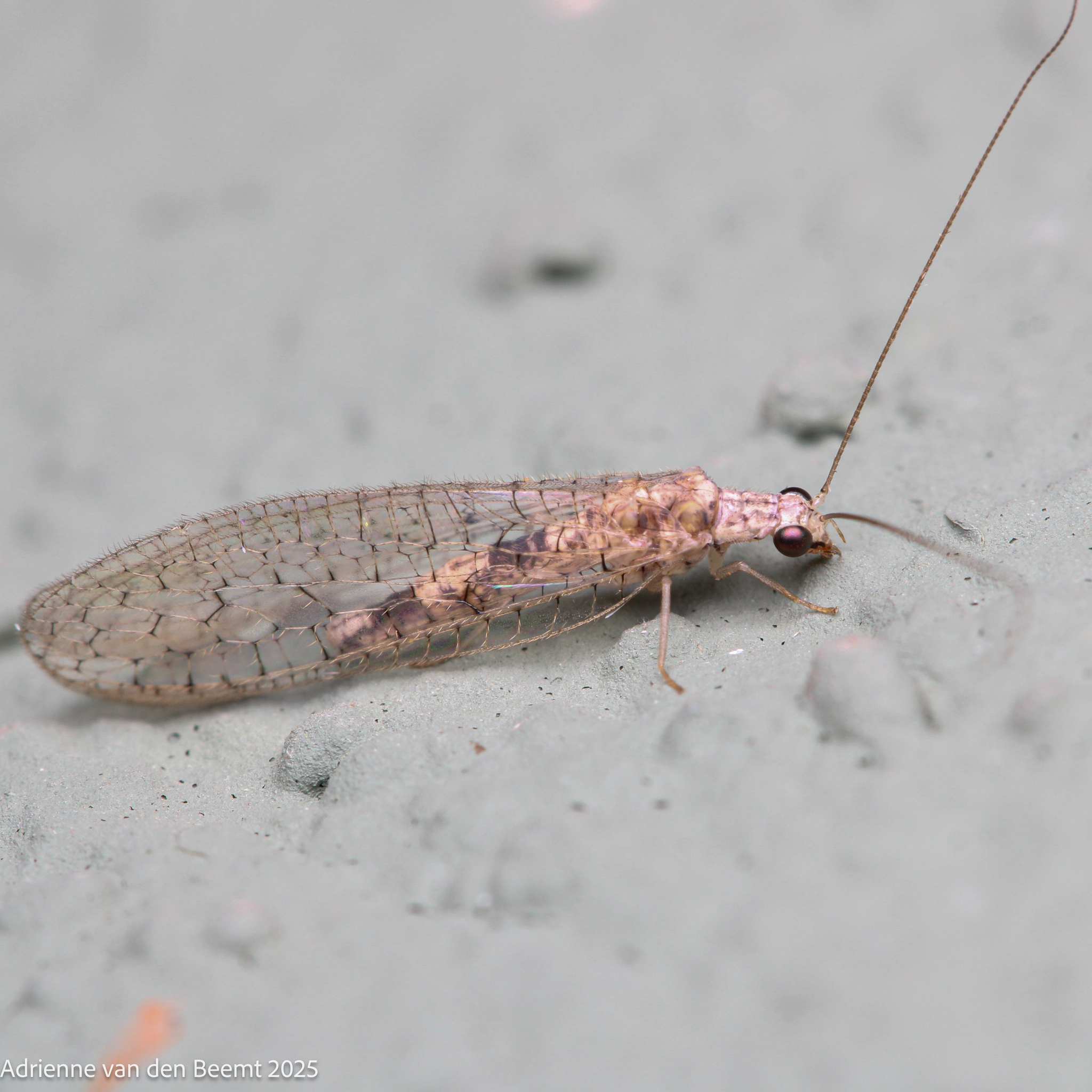
Eremochrysa (Eremochrysa) pima

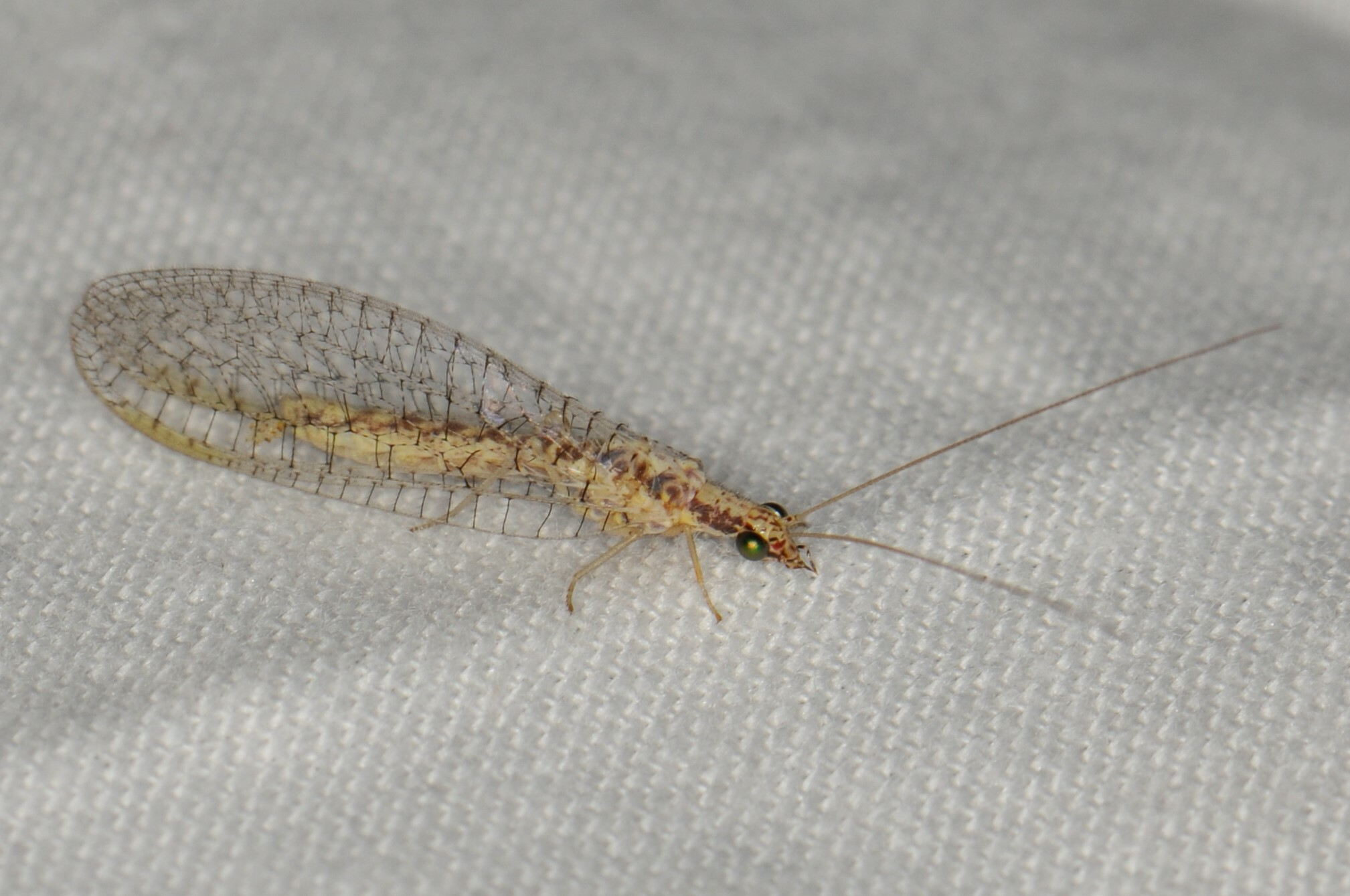
Eremochrysa (Eremochrysa) punctinervis

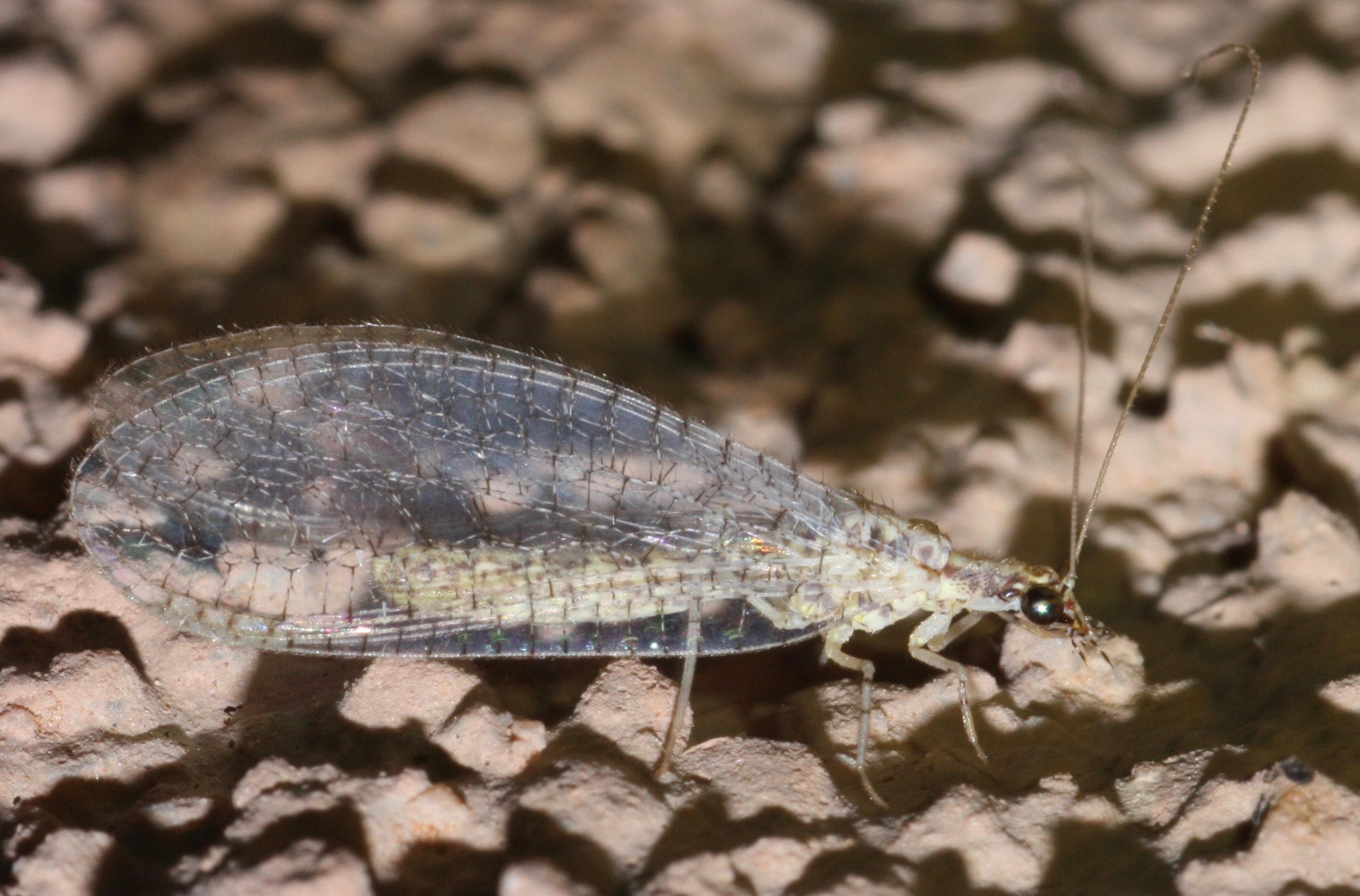
Eremochrysa (Eremochrysa) tibialis

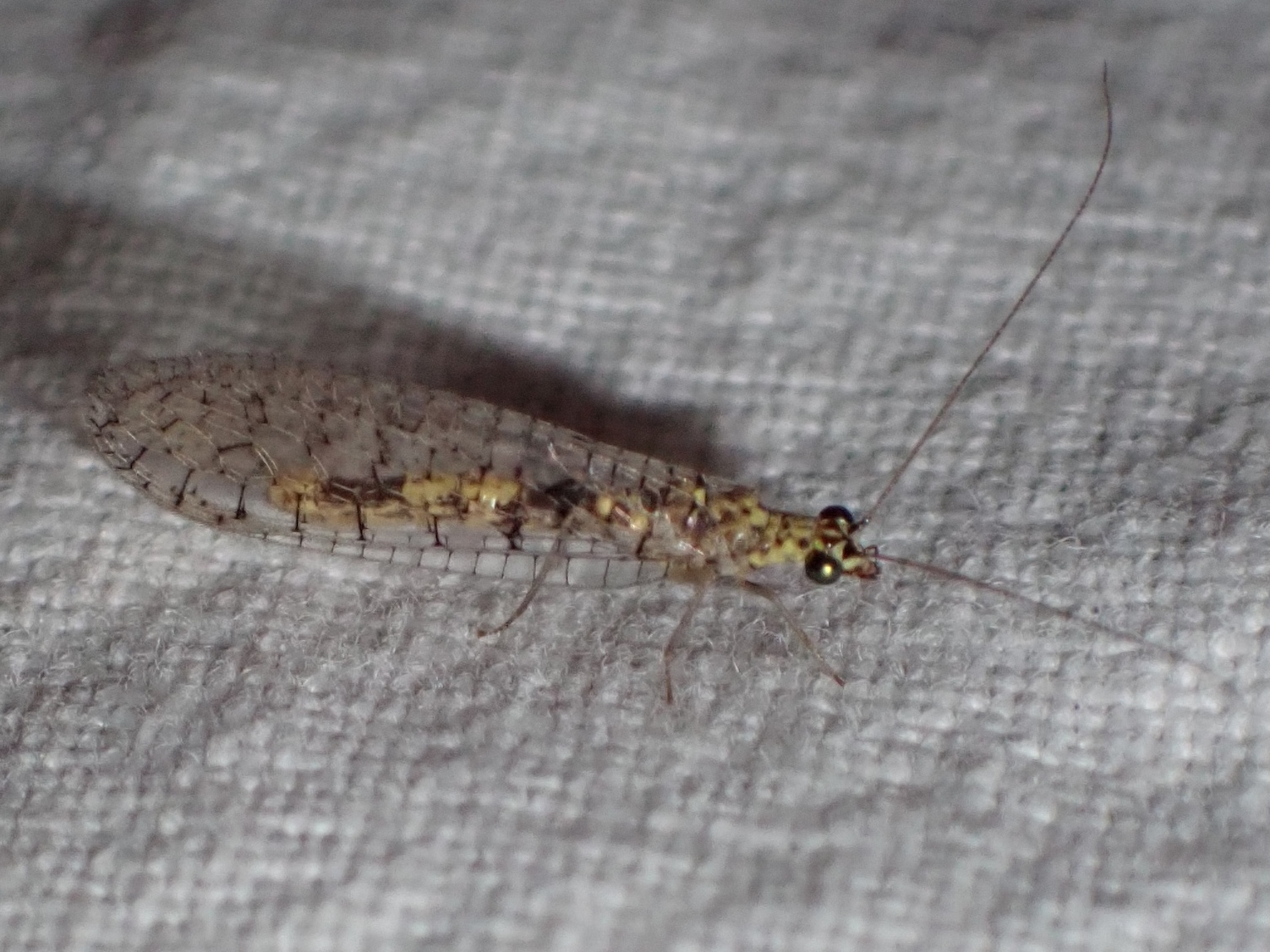
Eremochrysa (Eremochrysa) yosemite
