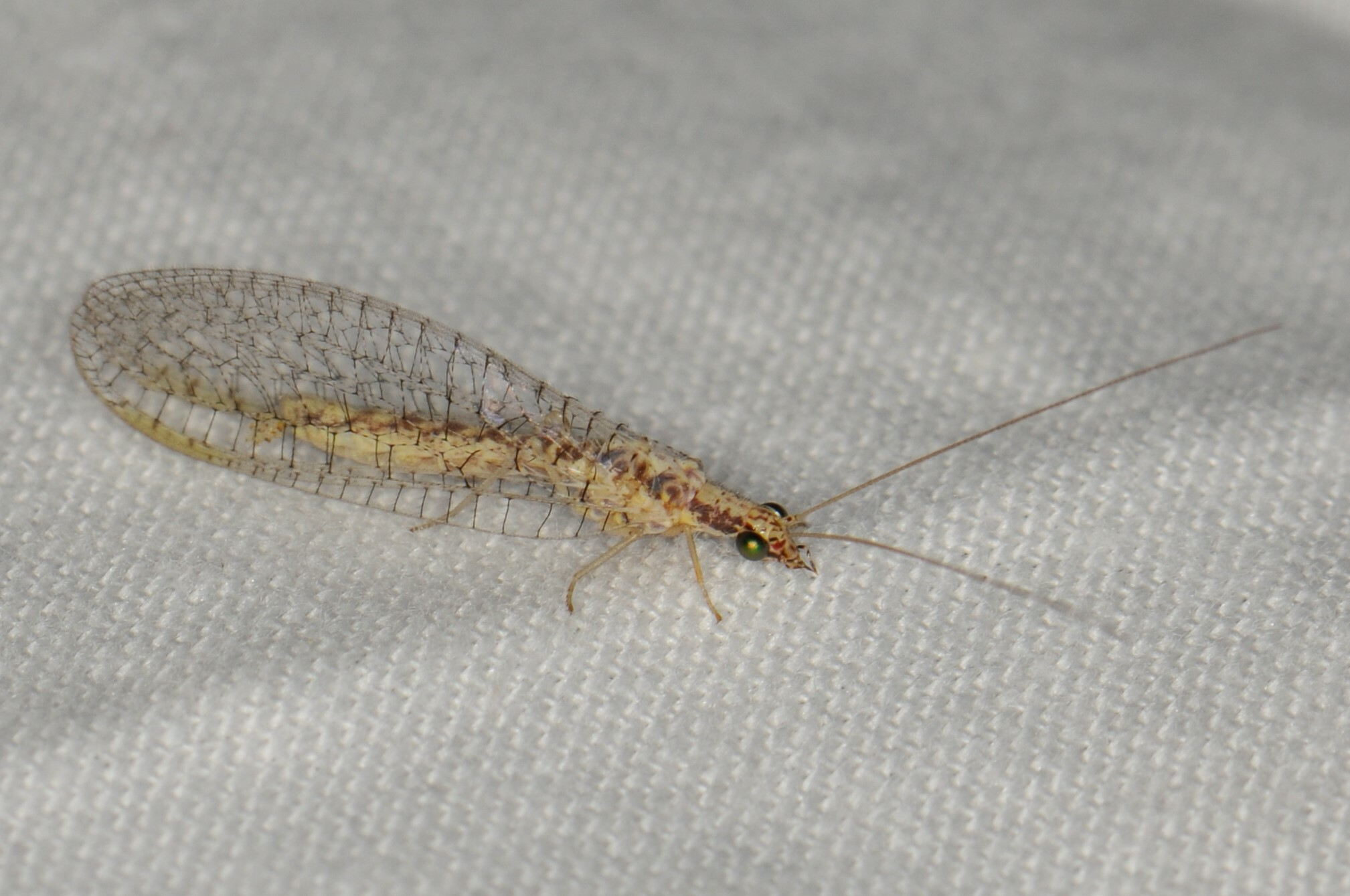

Scientific classification
- Domain: Eukaryota
- Kingdom: Animalia
- Phylum: Arthropoda
- Class: Insecta
- Order: Neuroptera
- Family: Chrysopidae
- Tribe: Chrysopini
- Genus: Eremochrysa
- Species: E. punctinervis

Binomial name
- Eremochrysa punctinervis (McLachlan, 1869)

= Eremochrysa punctinervis =

Species of lacewing

Eremochrysa punctinervis is a species of green lacewing in the family Chrysopidae. It is found in Central America and North America.
