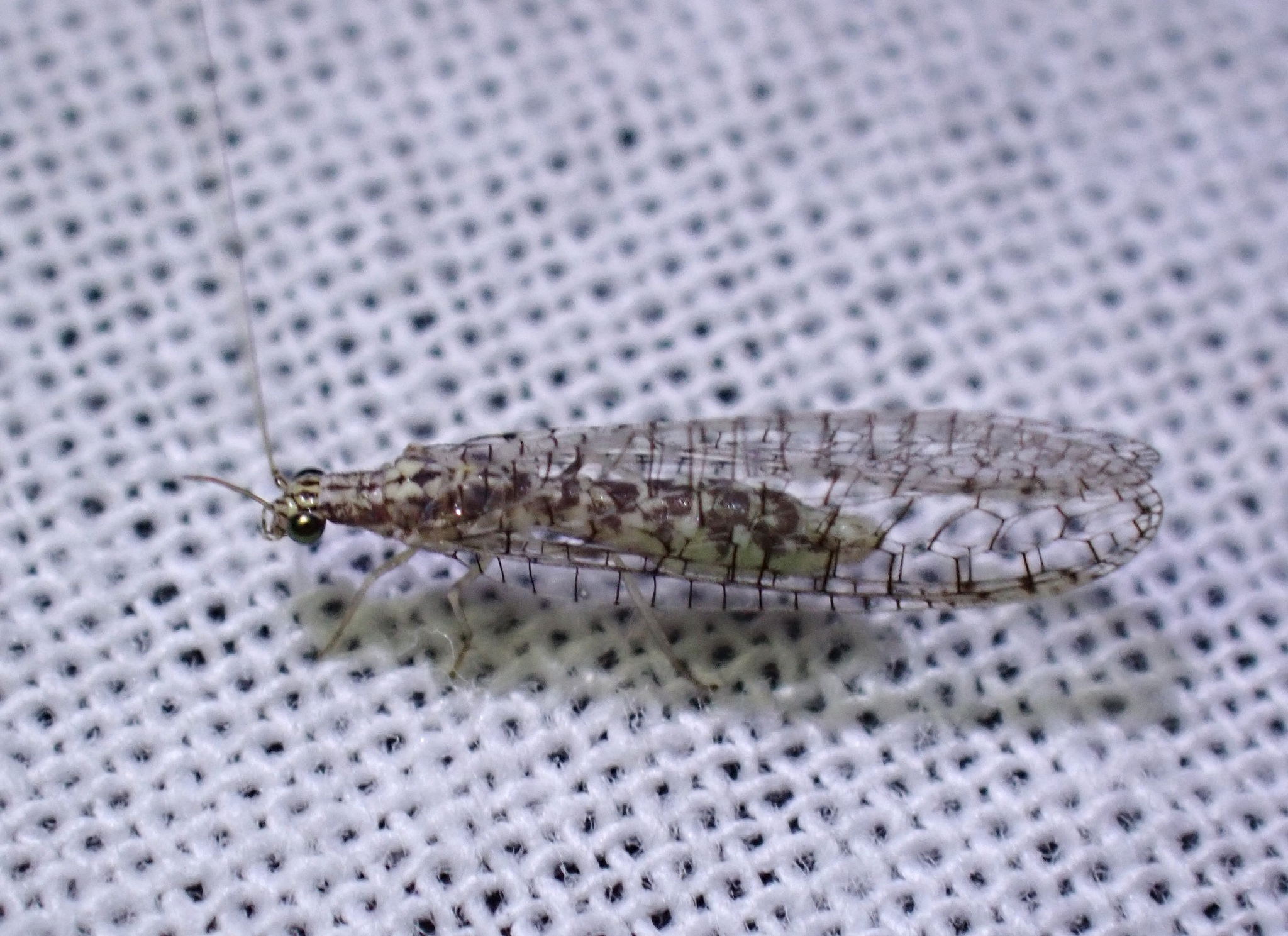

Scientific classification
- Domain: Eukaryota
- Kingdom: Animalia
- Phylum: Arthropoda
- Class: Insecta
- Order: Neuroptera
- Family: Chrysopidae
- Tribe: Chrysopini
- Genus: Eremochrysa
- Species: E. fraterna

Binomial name
- Eremochrysa fraterna (Banks, 1897)

= Eremochrysa fraterna =

Species of lacewing

Eremochrysa fraterna is a species of green lacewing in the family Chrysopidae. It is found in North America.
