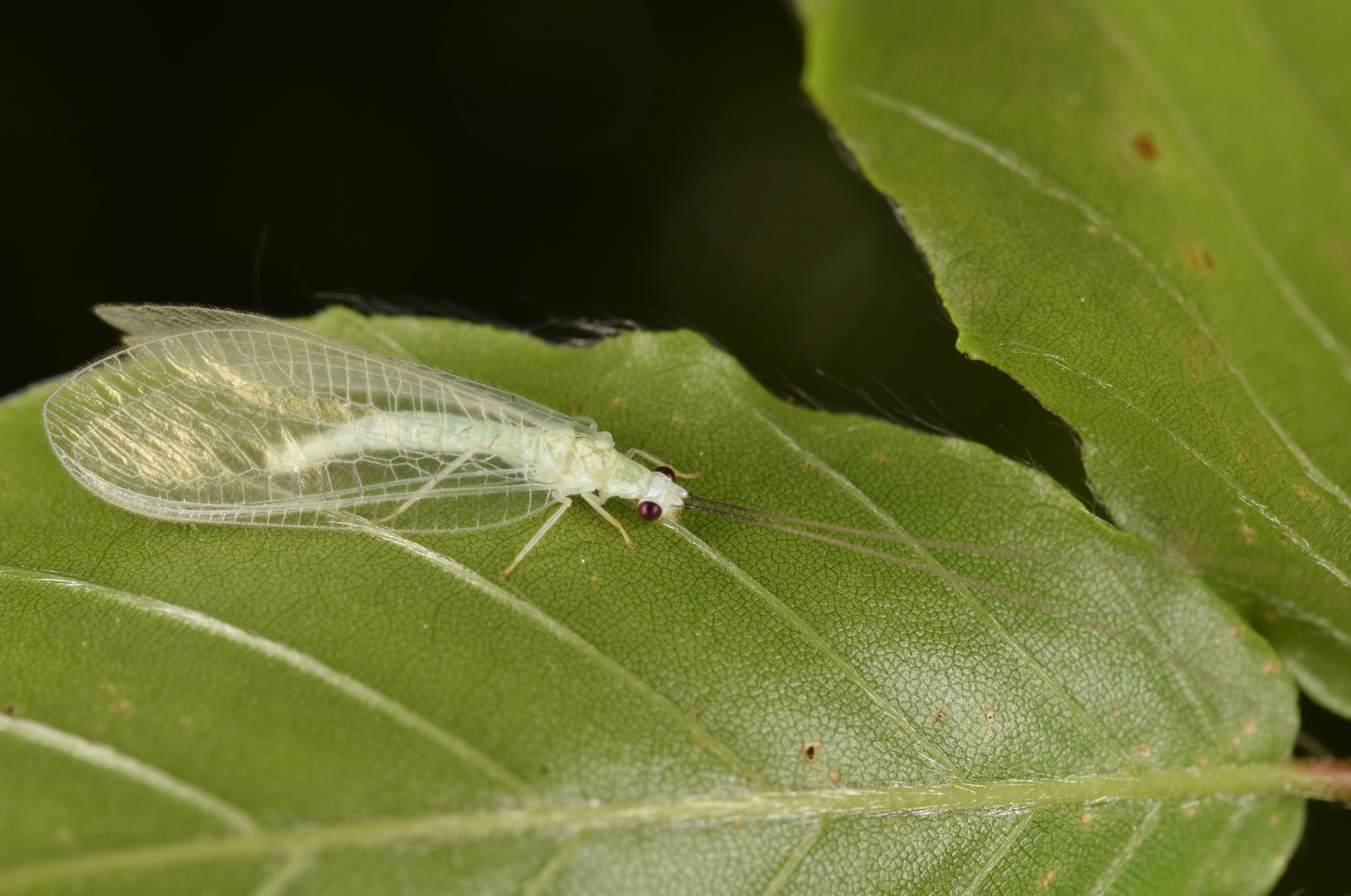

Scientific classification
- Domain: Eukaryota
- Kingdom: Animalia
- Phylum: Arthropoda
- Class: Insecta
- Order: Neuroptera
- Family: Chrysopidae
- Genus: Ceraeochrysa
- Species: C. lineaticornis

Binomial name
- Ceraeochrysa lineaticornis (Fitch, 1855)

Synonyms
- Ceraeochrysa puncticornis (Fitch, 1855); Ceraeochrysa stichoptera (Navás, 1914)

= Ceraeochrysa lineaticornis =

Species of lacewing

Ceraeochrysa lineaticornis is a species of green lacewing in the family Chrysopidae. It is found in North America.
