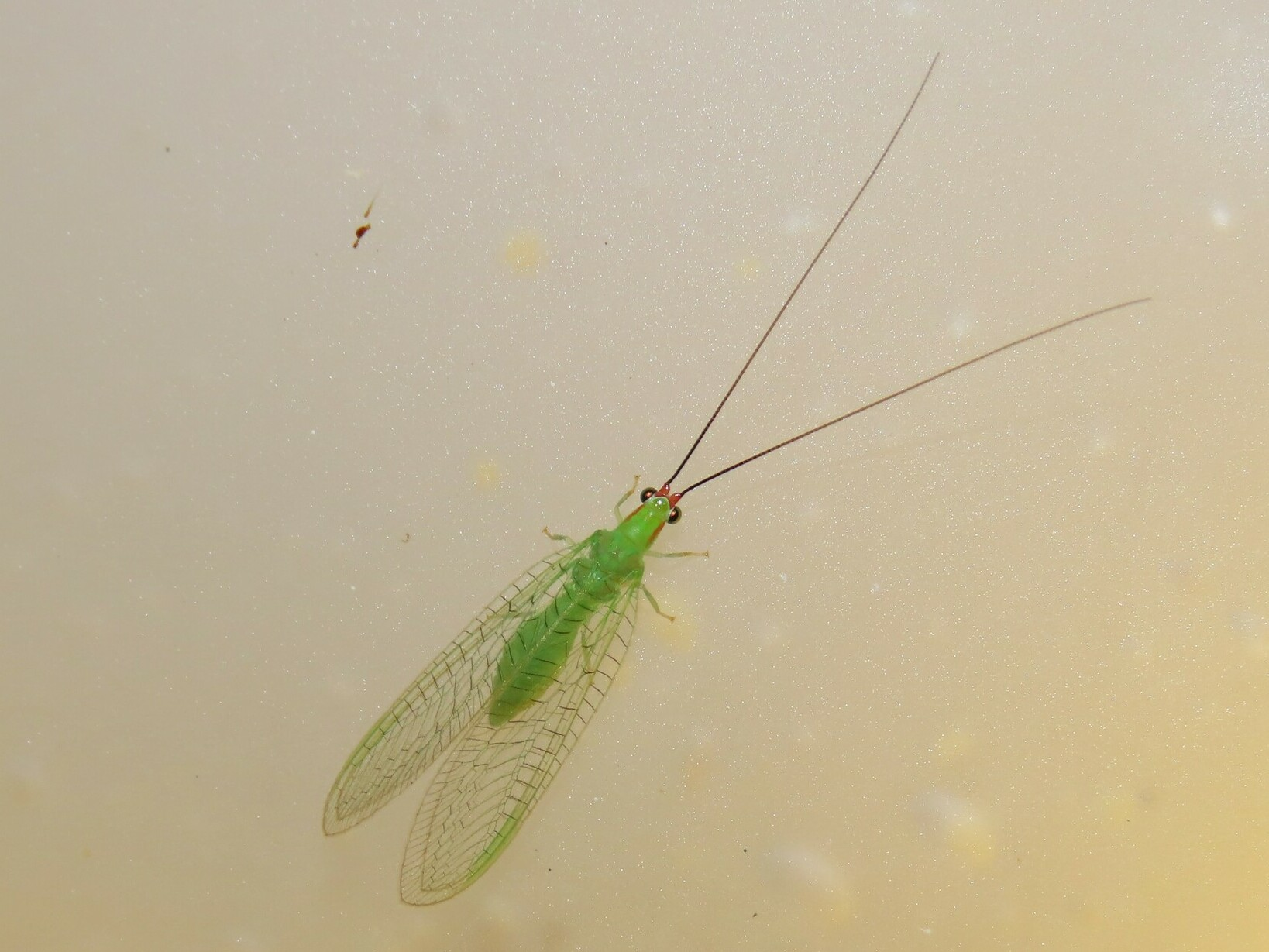
- C. smithi in Orange County, Florida

Scientific classification
- Domain: Eukaryota
- Kingdom: Animalia
- Phylum: Arthropoda
- Class: Insecta
- Order: Neuroptera
- Family: Chrysopidae
- Tribe: Chrysopini
- Genus: Ceraeochrysa
- Species: C. smithi

Binomial name
- Ceraeochrysa smithi (Navás, 1914)

Synonyms
- Ceraeochrysa neotropica (Navás, 1929); Ceraeochrysa poeyi (Navás, 1924); Chrysopa neotropica Navás, 1929; Chrysopa poeyi Navás, 1924; Chrysopa smithi Navás, 1914

= Ceraeochrysa smithi =

Species of lacewing

Ceraeochrysa smithi is a species of green lacewing in the family Chrysopidae. It is found in the Caribbean Sea, Central America, North America, and South America.
