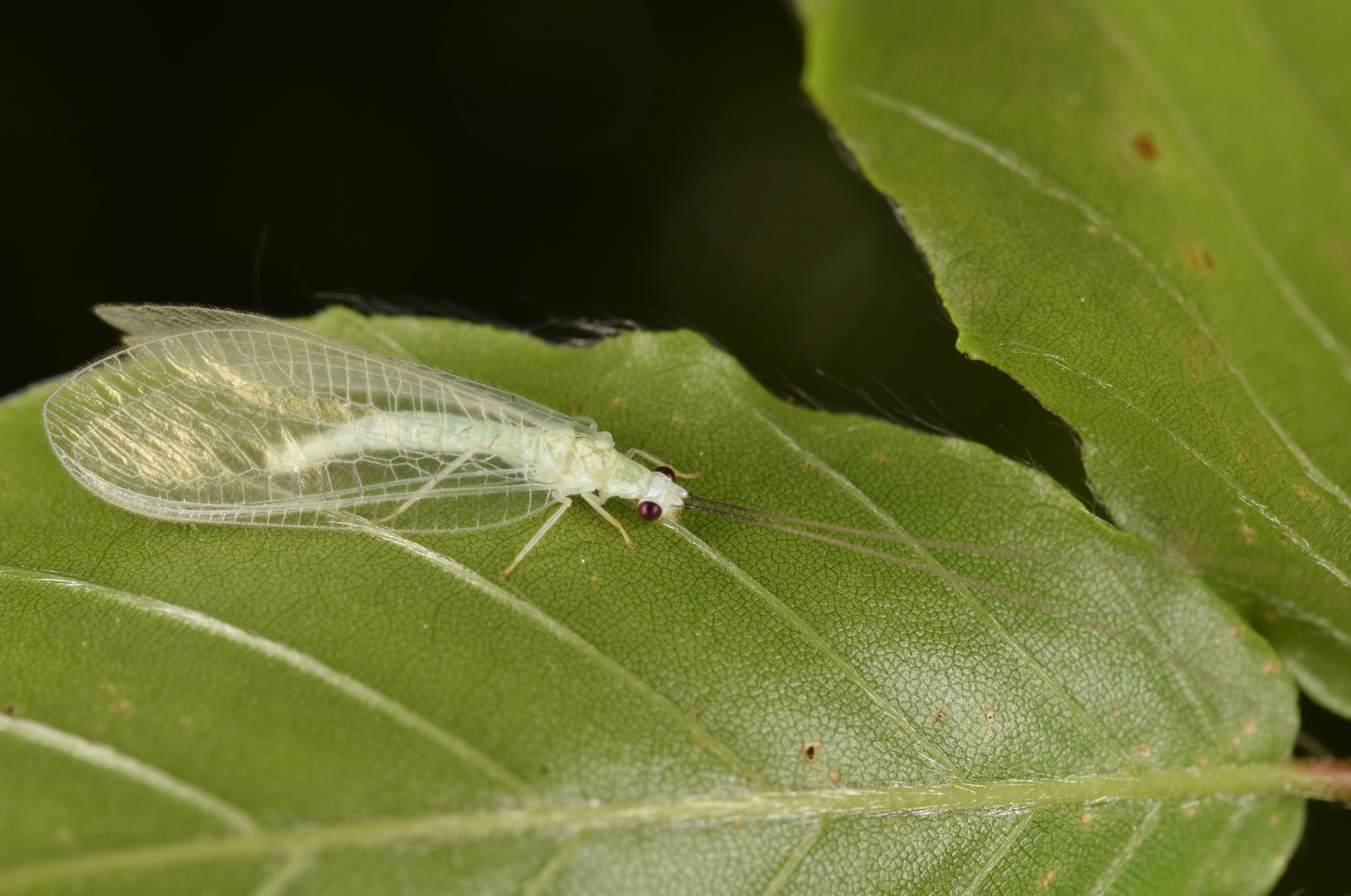
- Ceraeochrysa lineatoriconis

Scientific classification
- Domain: Eukaryota
- Kingdom: Animalia
- Phylum: Arthropoda
- Class: Insecta
- Order: Neuroptera
- Family: Chrysopidae
- Tribe: Chrysopini
- Genus: Ceraeochrysa; Adams, 1982

= Ceraeochrysa =

Genus of lacewings

Ceraeochrysa is genus of green lacewing in the family Chrysopidae found in the Americas.

== Taxonomy ==
The genus Ceraeochrysa was first described by Adams in 1982 after recognizing differences in the structure of genitalia from the genus Chrysopa.

== Description and Identification ==
Many of the species have red or brown marks on the pronotum and one or two stripes on the scape.

== Distribution ==
This genus occurs in the Americas from the southeast of Canada to Argentina. The greatest biodiversity is found in the Neotropics, particularly Brazil and Costa Rica.

== Species ==
The genus Ceraeochrysa is the second largest genus within Chrysopidae and contains the following 61 species:

- Ceraeochrysa acmon
- Ceraeochrysa acutipuppis
- Ceraeochrysa adornata
- Ceraeochrysa anceps
- Ceraeochrysa angulata
- Ceraeochrysa angusta
- Ceraeochrysa ariasi
- Ceraeochrysa arioles
- Ceraeochrysa aroguesina
- Ceraeochrysa berlandi
- Ceraeochrysa caligata
- Ceraeochrysa castilloi
- Ceraeochrysa caucana
- Ceraeochrysa cincta
- Ceraeochrysa claveri
- Ceraeochrysa cornuta
- Ceraeochrysa costaricensis
- Ceraeochrysa cubana
- Ceraeochrysa derospogon
- Ceraeochrysa digitata
- Ceraeochrysa discolor
- Ceraeochrysa dislepis
- Ceraeochrysa dolichosvela
- Ceraeochrysa effusa
- Ceraeochrysa elegans
- Ceraeochrysa everes
- Ceraeochrysa fairchildi
- Ceraeochrysa falcifera
- Ceraeochrysa fiebrigi
- Ceraeochrysa gradata
- Ceraeochrysa inbio
- Ceraeochrysa indicata
- Ceraeochrysa infausta
- Ceraeochrysa josephina
- Ceraeochrysa lateralis
- Ceraeochrysa laufferi
- Ceraeochrysa lineaticornis
- Ceraeochrysa melaenopareia
- Ceraeochrysa michaelmuris
- Ceraeochrysa montoyana
- Ceraeochrysa nigripedis
- Ceraeochrysa nigripes
- Ceraeochrysa paraguaria
- Ceraeochrysa pittieri
- Ceraeochrysa pseudovaricosa
- Ceraeochrysa rafaeli
- Ceraeochrysa reddyi
- Ceraeochrysa reducta
- Ceraeochrysa rochina
- Ceraeochrysa sanchezi
- Ceraeochrysa scapularis
- Ceraeochrysa silvanoi
- Ceraeochrysa smithi
- Ceraeochrysa squalidens
- Ceraeochrysa squama
- Ceraeochrysa tacanensis
- Ceraeochrysa tauberae
- Ceraeochrysa tenuicornis
- Ceraeochrysa torresi
- Ceraeochrysa tucumana
- Ceraeochrysa valida

== Gallery ==
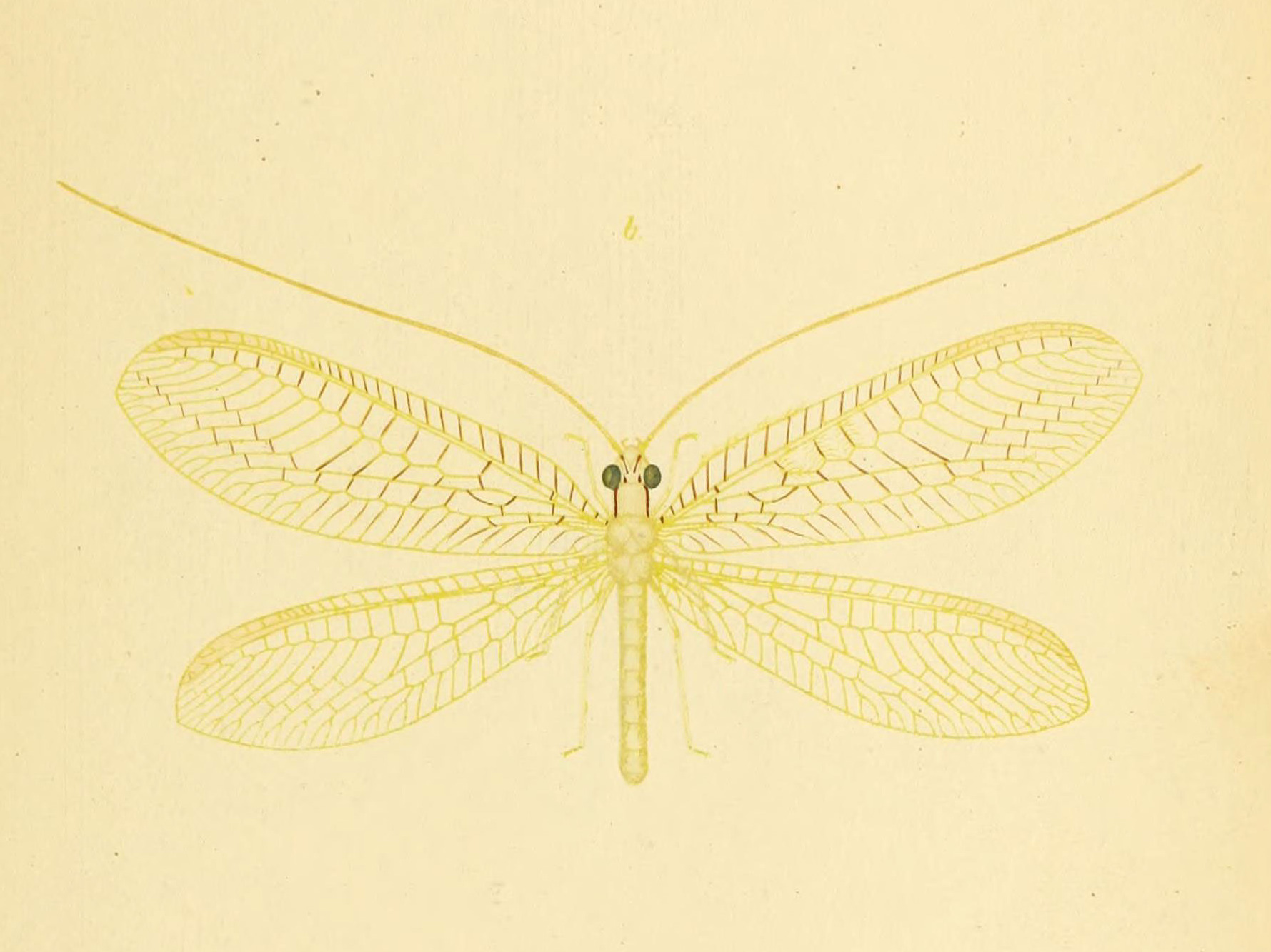
C. cincta sketch by Schneider

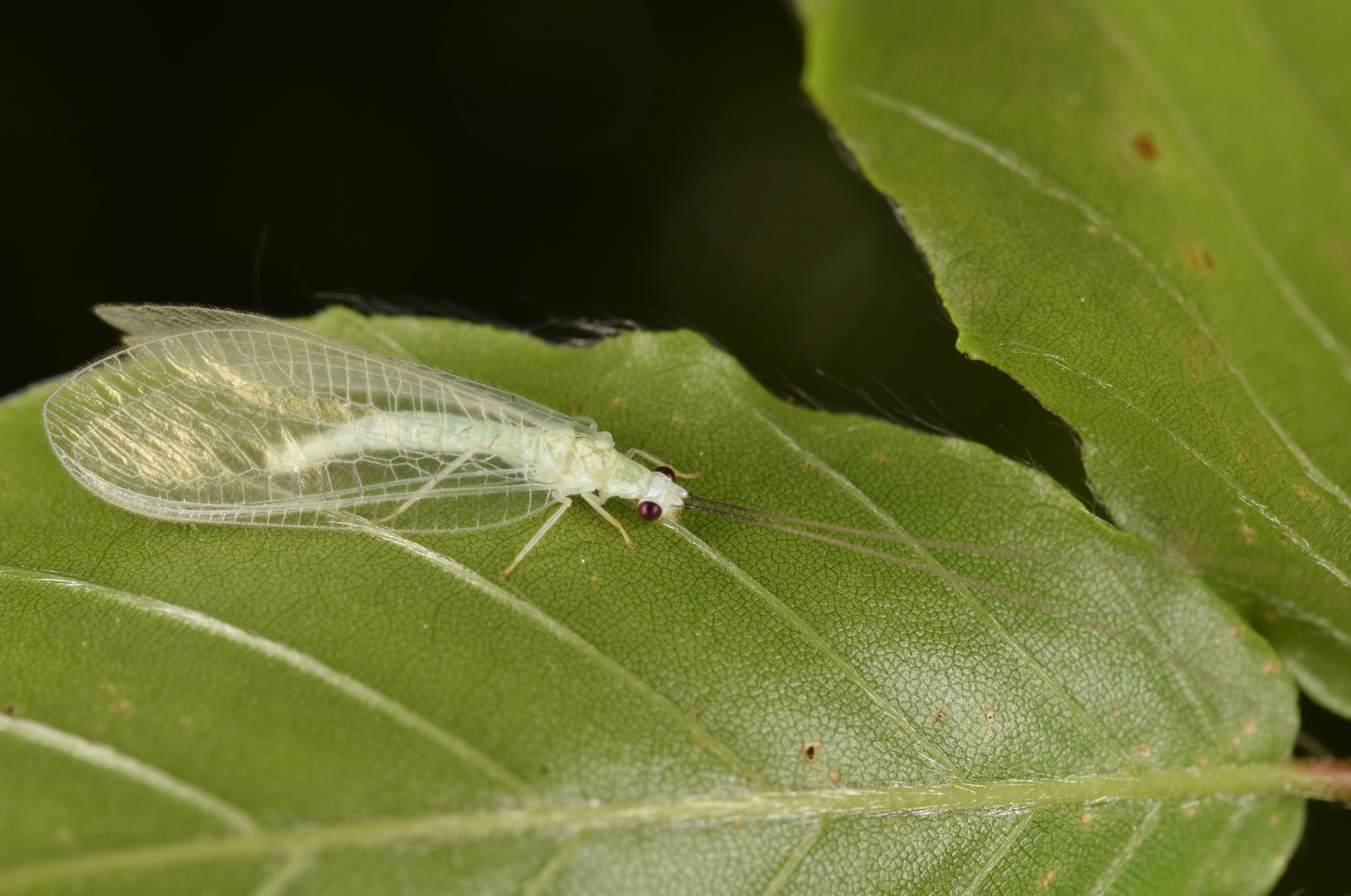
C. lineaticornis in Canton, Georgia

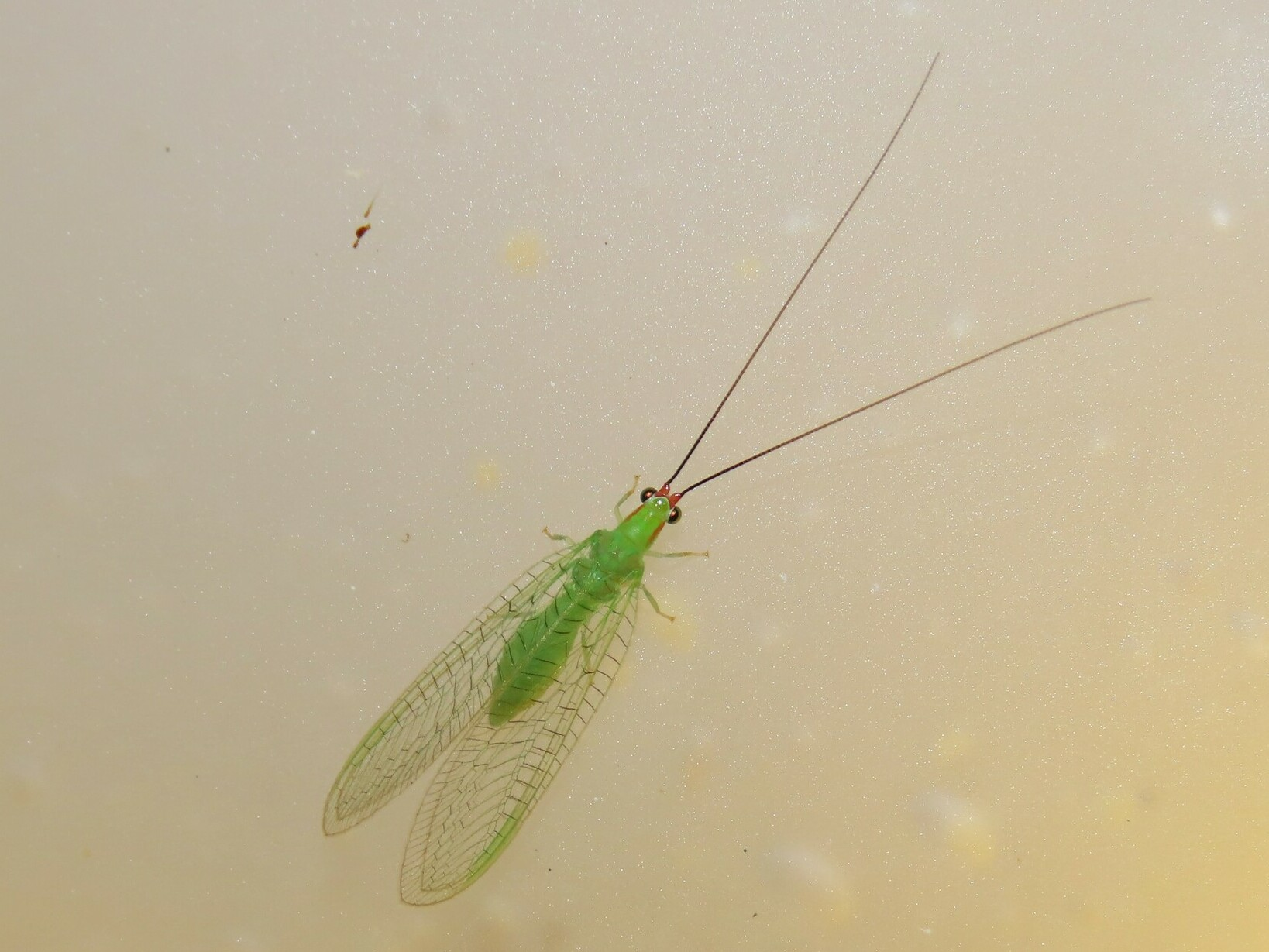
C. smithi in Orange county, Florida
