= Ceraeochrysa elegans =

Scientific classification
- Domain: Eukaryota
- Kingdom: Animalia
- Phylum: Arthropoda
- Class: Insecta
- Order: Neuroptera
- Family: Chrysopidae
- Genus: Ceraeochrysa
- Species: C. elegans

Binomial name
- Ceraeochrysa elegans Penny, 1998

Species of lacewing

Ceraeochrysa elegans is a green lacewing species in the genus Ceraeochrysa. It is found in Costa Rica.
