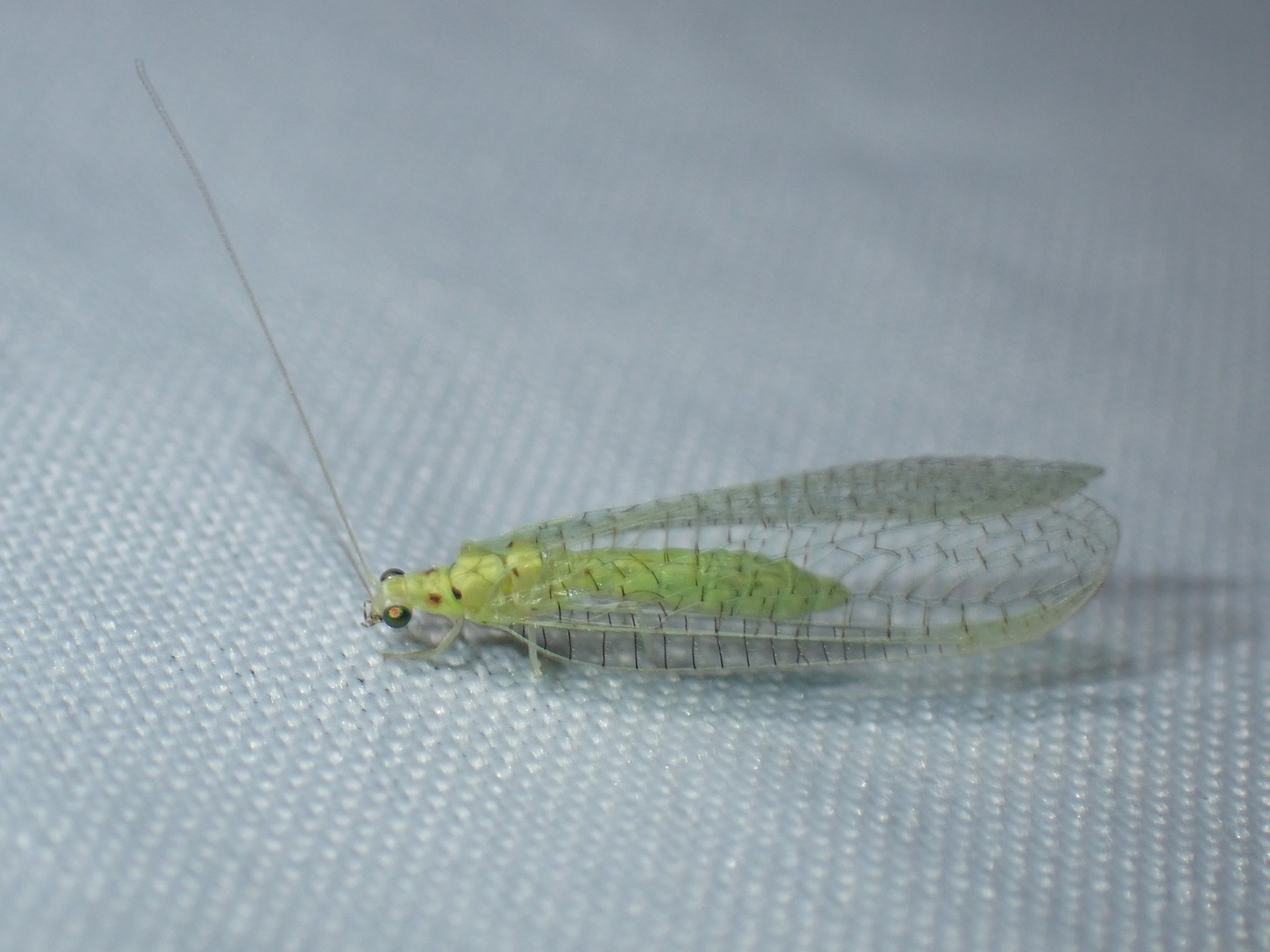

Scientific classification
- Domain: Eukaryota
- Kingdom: Animalia
- Phylum: Arthropoda
- Class: Insecta
- Order: Neuroptera
- Family: Chrysopidae
- Tribe: Chrysopini
- Genus: Apertochrysa
- Species: A. sierra

Binomial name
- Apertochrysa sierra (Banks, 1924)

= Apertochrysa sierra =

Species of lacewing

Apertochrysa sierra is a species of green lacewing in the family Chrysopidae. It is found in the western United States and Baja California, Mexico.
