= Apertochrysa pilinota =

Scientific classification
- Domain: Eukaryota
- Kingdom: Animalia
- Phylum: Arthropoda
- Class: Insecta
- Order: Neuroptera
- Family: Chrysopidae
- Genus: Apertochrysa
- Species: A. pilinota

Binomial name
- Apertochrysa pilinota (Kang-zhen, Wen-zhu, Jun-zhi & Xing-ke, 2004)

Species of lacewing

Apertochrysa pilinota is a species of green lacewing.
