= Apertochrysa flavinotala =

Scientific classification
- Domain: Eukaryota
- Kingdom: Animalia
- Phylum: Arthropoda
- Class: Insecta
- Order: Neuroptera
- Family: Chrysopidae
- Genus: Apertochrysa
- Species: A. flavinotala

Binomial name
- Apertochrysa flavinotala (Kang-zhen, Wen-zhu, Jun-zhi & Xing-ke, 2004)

Species of lacewing

Apertochrysa flavinotala is a species of green lacewing.
