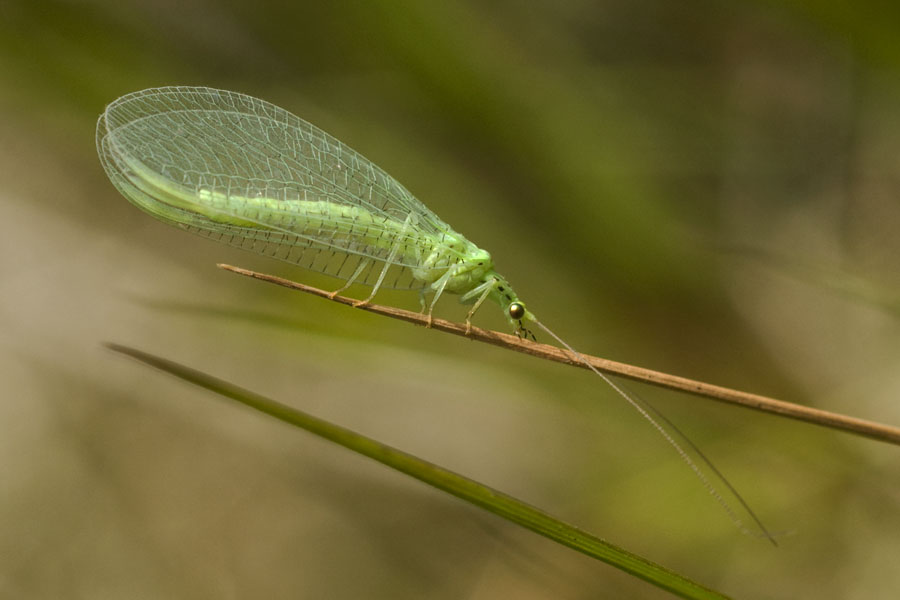
- Apertochrysa prasina

Scientific classification
- Domain: Eukaryota
- Kingdom: Animalia
- Phylum: Arthropoda
- Class: Insecta
- Order: Neuroptera
- Family: Chrysopidae
- Subfamily: Chrysopinae
- Tribe: Chrysopini
- Genus: Apertochrysa; Tjeder, 1966

Diversity
- 183 described species

Synonyms
- Navasius Yang & Yang, 1990; Dichochrysa Yang, 1991; Pseudomallada Tsukaguchi, 1995

= Apertochrysa =

Genus of lacewings

Apertochrysa is a genus of green lacewings in the family Chrysopidae. There are 183 described species in the genus.

== Taxonomy ==
This genus was originally described in 1990 by Xing-ke Yang and Chi-kun Yang under the name of Navasius. The name was a junior homonym of Navasius Esben-Petersen, 1936, a species of antlion, so a replacement name of Dichochrysa was proposed by Yang in 1991. However, a ruling by the International Commission on Zoological Nomenclature instead maintained priority of the name Pseudomallada Tsukaguchi, 1995, thereby renaming the species previously described under the name of Dichochrysa. Further taxonomic work in 2021 by Breitkreuz, Duelli, and Oswald synonymized those genera under Apertochrysa Tjeder, 1966.

== Distribution ==
Apertochrysa is a subcosmopolitan genus. The majority of species are known from the Palearctic region, particularly from the continents of Asia and Africa.

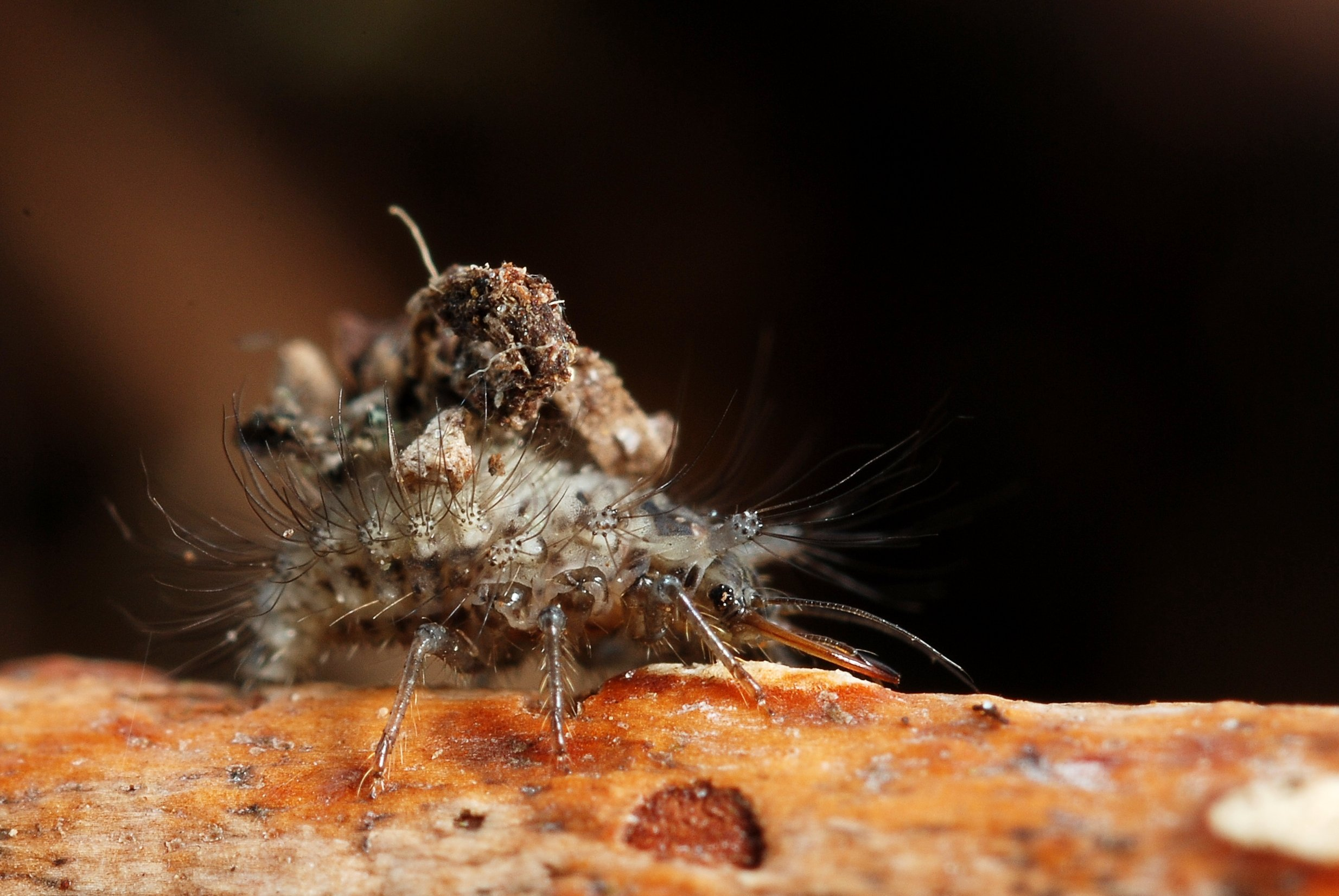
Apertochrysa sp. larva

== Species ==
The following 183 species are currently classified under Apertochrysa:

- A. abdominalis (Brauer, 1856)
- A. aegyptiaca (Navás, 1915)
- A. afghanica (Hölzel, 1973)
- A. alarconi (Navás, 1915)
- A. albofrontata (C.-k. Yang et al., 1999)
- A. alcestes (Banks, 1911)
- A. alliumolens (Hölzel et al., 1997)
- A. allochroma (C.-k. Yang et al., 1999)
- A. alviolata (X.-k. Yang & C.-k. Yang, 1990)
- A. amseli (Hölzel, 1980)
- A. ancistroidea (X.-k. Yang & C.-k. Yang, 1990)
- A. angustivittata (Dong et al., 2004)
- A. anomala (Tillyard, 1917)
- A. arabica (Hölzel, 1995)
- A. arcuata (Dong et al., 2004)
- A. ariadne (Hölzel, 1978)
- A. aromatica (C.-k. Yang & X.-k. Yang, 1989)
- A. aspersa (Wesmael, 1841)
- A. astur (Banks, 1937)
- A. atrosparsa (Tjeder, 1966)
- A. australis (New, 1980)
- A. barkamana (C.-k. Yang et al., 1992)
- A. baronissa (Navás, 1921)
- A. basuto (Tjeder, 1966)
- A. benedictae (Séméria, 1976)
- A. bibens (Hölzel et al., 1997)
- A. birungana (Navás, 1924)
- A. brachychela (C.-k. Yang et al., 1999)
- A. budongensis (Hölzel, 2001)
- A. caffer (Tjeder, 1966)
- A. carinata (Dong et al., 2004)
- A. chailensis (Ghosh, 1977)
- A. chaoi (C.-k. Yang et al., 1999)
- A. chlorella (Navás, 1914)
- A. chloris (Schneider, 1851)
- A. choui (C.-k. Yang & X.-k. Yang, 1989)
- A. clathrata (Schneider, 1845)
- A. cognatella (Okamoto, 1914)
- A. collartina (Navás, 1932)
- A. congolana (Navás, 1911)
- A. cordata (X.-x. Wang & C.-k. Yang, 1992)
- A. cyprina (Navás, 1932)
- A. decaryna (Navás, 1924)
- A. decolor (Navás, 1914)
- A. decolor (Navás, 1936) (unreplaced junior homonym)
- A. deqenana (C.-k. Yang et al., 1992)
- A. derbendica (Hölzel, 1967)
- A. deserta (Navás, 1912)
- A. diaphana (C.-k. Yang et al., 1999)
- A. dubia (Hölzel 1973)
- A. duplicata (Navás, 1934)
- A. edwardsi (Banks, 1940)
- A. epunctata (X.-k. Yang & C.-k. Yang, 1990)
- A. eremita (Kimmins, 1955)
- A. estriata (C.-k. Yang et al., 1999)
- A. eumorpha (C.-k. Yang et al., 1999)
- A. eurydera (Navás, 1910)
- A. fanjingana (C.-k. Yang & X.-x. Wang, 1988)
- A. flammefrontata (C.-k. Yang et al., 1999)
- A. flavifrons (Brauer, 1851)
- A. flavinotala (Dong et al., 2004)
- A. flexuosa (X.-k. Yang & C.-k. Yang, 1990)
- A. forcipata (X.-k. Yang & C.-k. Yang, 1993)
- A. formosana (Matsumura, 1910)
- A. fortunata (McLachlan, 1882)
- A. fuscineura (C.-k. Yang et al., 1992)
- A. genei (Rambur, 1842)
- A. gradata (X.-k. Yang & C.-k. Yang, 1993)
- A. granadensis (Pictet, 1865)
- A. gravesi (Navás, 1926)
- A. gunvorae (Tjeder, 1966)
- A. hadimensis (Canbulat & Kiyak, 2005)
- A. hainana (X.-k. Yang & C.-k. Yang, 1990)
- A. hamata (Tjeder, 1966)
- A. handschini (Navás, 1929)
- A. healdi (Navás, 1926)
- A. hespera (X.-k. Yang & C.-k. Yang, 1990)
- A. heudei (Navás, 1934)
- A. hospitalis (Hölzel & Ohm, 1995)
- A. huashanensis (C.-k. Yang & X.-k. Yang, 1989)
- A. hubeiana (C.-k. Yang & X.-x. Wang, 1990)
- A. iberica (Navás, 1903)
- A. ifranina (Navás, 1936)
- A. ignea (X.-k. Yang & C.-k. Yang, 1990)
- A. illota (Navás, 1908)
- A. incongrua (Fraser, 1951)
- A. incrassata (Tjeder, 1966)
- A. ingae (Tjeder, 1966)
- A. iniqua (Navás, 1931)
- A. inopinata (Hölzel & Ohm, 1995)
- A. inornata (Navás, 1901)
- A. irrorella (Navás, 1936)
- A. jiuzhaigouana (X.-k. Yang & X.-x. Wang in X.-k. Yang et al., 2005)
- A. joannisi (Navás, 1910)
- A. karooensis (Hölzel, 1993)
- A. kiangsuensis (Navás, 1934)
- A. kibonotoensis (van der Weele, 1910)
- A. kinnaurensis (Gosh, 1977)
- A. leai (Tillyard, 1917)
- A. lii (C.-k. Yang et al., 1999)
- A. longwangshana (X.-k. Yang, 1998)
- A. lophophora (X.-k. Yang & C.-k. Yang, 1990)
- A. luaboensis (Tjeder, 1966)
- A. luctuosa (Banks, 1911)
- A. macleodi (Adams and Garland, 1983)
- A. maghrebina (Hölzel & Ohm, 1984)
- A. makrana (Hölzel, 1966)
- A. mangkangensis (Dong et al., 2004)
- A. marchionissa (Navás, 1915)
- A. mauriciana (Hölzel & Ohm, 1991)
- A. mediata (X.-k. Yang & C.-k. Yang, 1993)
- A. medogana (C.-k. Yang et al. in Huang et al., 1988)
- A. melanopis (Navás, 1914)
- A. militaris (Hölzel & Ohm, 2000)
- A. mira (Hölzel, 1973)
- A. namibensis (Hölzel, 1993)
- A. nautarum (Tillyard, 1917)
- A. nicolaina (Navás, 1929)
- A. nigra (McLachlan, 1869)
- A. nigricornuta (X.-k. Yang & C.-k. Yang, 1990)
- A. norfolkensis (Tillyard, 1917)
- A. nubilata (Navás, 1910)
- A. nyassalandica (Navás, 1914)
- A. oralis (Navás, 1914)
- A. parabola (Okamoto, 1919)
- A. perfecta (Banks, 1895)
- A. perpallida (Tjeder, 1966)
- A. pervenosa (Tjeder, 1966)
- A. phantosula (X.-k. Yang & C.-k. Yang, 1990)
- A. phlebia (Navas, 1927)
- A. physophlebia (Navas, 1914)
- A. picteti (McLachlan, 1880)
- A. pieli (Navás, 1931)
- A. pilinota (Dong et al., 2004)
- A. prasina (Burmeister, 1839)
- A. pulchrina (Tjeder, 1966)
- A. puncticollis (Banks, 1940)
- A. punctilabris (McLachlan, 1894)
- A. punctithorax (New, 1980)
- A. qingchengshana (C.-k. Yang et al., 1992)
- A. qinlingensis (C.-k. Yang & X.-k. Yang, 1989)
- A. raedarii (Hölzel & Ohm, 2000)
- A. rothschildi (Navás, 1915)
- A. rubicunda (Hölzel, 1993)
- A. rubra (Hölzel et al., 1994)
- A. sana (X.-k. Yang & C.-k. Yang, 1990)
- A. sansibarica (Kolbe, 1897)
- A. selenia (Navás, 1912)
- A. sensitiva (Tjeder, 1940)
- A. setosa (Hölzel & Ohm, 1995)
- A. sierra (Banks, 1924)
- A. spadix (Hölzel, 1988)
- A. spissinervis (Tjeder, 1966)
- A. subcostalis (McLachlan, 1882)
- A. subcubitalis (Navás, 1901)
- A. subflavifrons (Tjeder, 1949)
- A. sybaritica (McLachlan in Fedchenko, 1875)
- A. tacta (Navás, 1921)
- A. teiresias (Hölzel & Ohm, 1982)
- A. triactinata (New, 1980)
- A. triangularis (Adams, 1978)
- A. triangularis (C.-k. Yang & X.-x. Wang, 1994) (unreplaced junior homonym)
- A. tridentata (X.-k. Yang & C.-k. Yang, 1990)
- A. truncatata (X.-k. Yang et al. in X.-k. Yang et al., 2005)
- A. umbrosa (Navás, 1914)
- A. ussuriensis (Makarkin, 1985)
- A. varians (Kimmins, 1959)
- A. venosa (Rambur, 1838)
- A. venosella (Esben-Petersen, 1920)
- A. ventralis (Curtis, 1834)
- A. venusta (Hölzel, 1974)
- A. verna (C.-k. Yang & X.-k. Yang, 1989)
- A. viridifrons (Hölzel & Ohm, 1999)
- A. vitticlypea (C.-k. Yang & X.-x. Wang, 1990)
- A. waitei (Tillyard, 1917)
- A. wangi (C.-k. Yang et al., 1992)
- A. wuchangana (C.-k. Yang & X.-x. Wang, 1990)
- A. xiamenana (C.-k. Yang et al., 1999)
- A. yangi (X.-k. Yang & X.-x. Wang in X.-k. Yang et al., 2005)
- A. yunnana (C.-k. Yang & X.-x. Wang, 1994)
- A. yuxianensis (Bian & Li, 1992)
- A. zelleri (Schneider, 1851)
- A. zulu (Tjeder, 1966)
