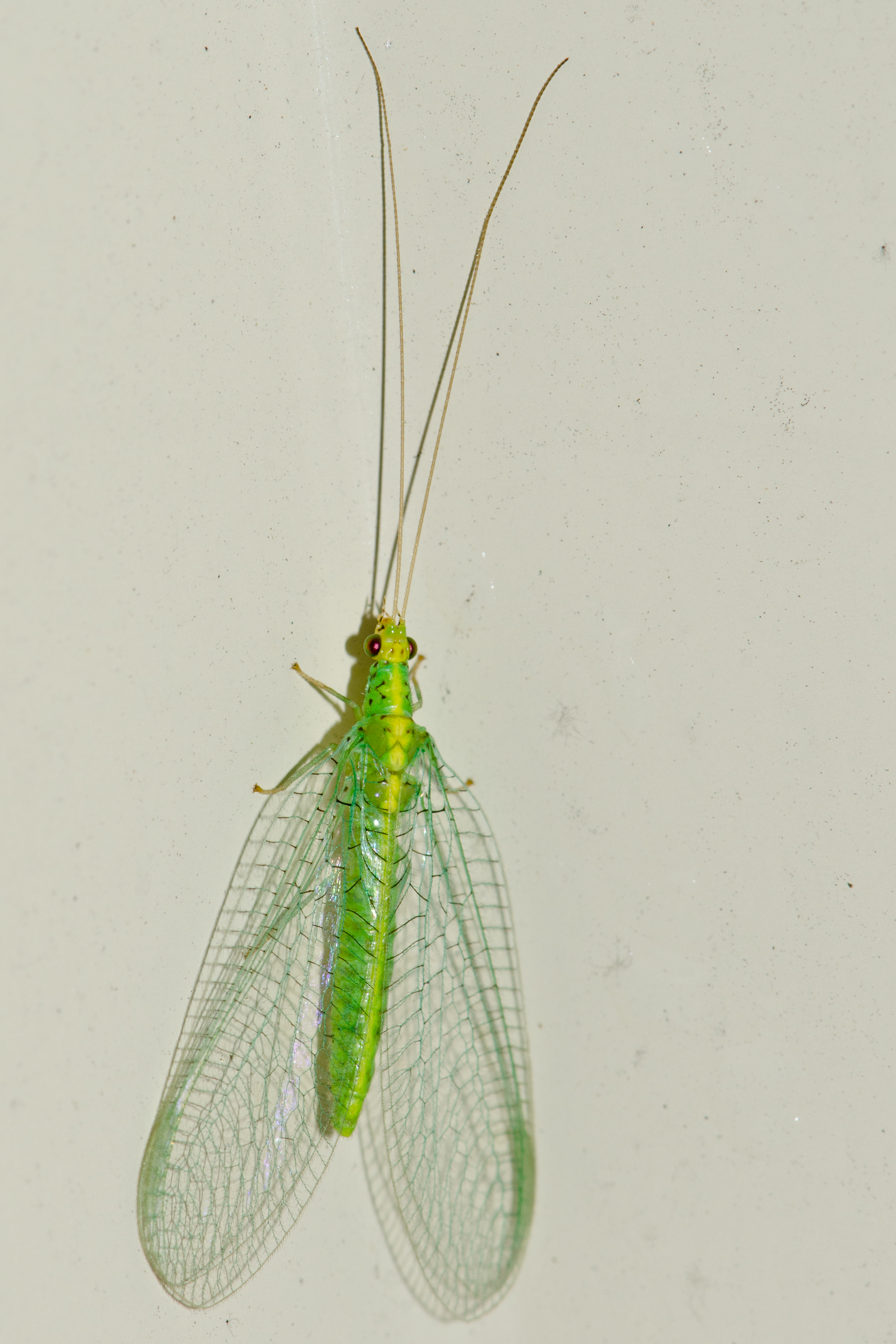

Scientific classification
- Kingdom: Animalia
- Phylum: Arthropoda
- Class: Insecta
- Order: Neuroptera
- Family: Chrysopidae
- Genus: Apertochrysa
- Species: A. edwardsi

Binomial name
- Apertochrysa edwardsi Banks, 1940

= Apertochrysa edwardsi =

Species of lacewing

Apertochrysa edwardsi is a species of green lacewing native to southern Australia.

== Description ==
Apertochrysa edwardsi has a wingspan of 12–25 mm (0.5–1 in). It has distinguishing v-shaped markings on the thorax.

== Distribution ==
Apertochrysa edwardsi lives in southern Australia. It is largely arboreal, and is rarely found on crops.
