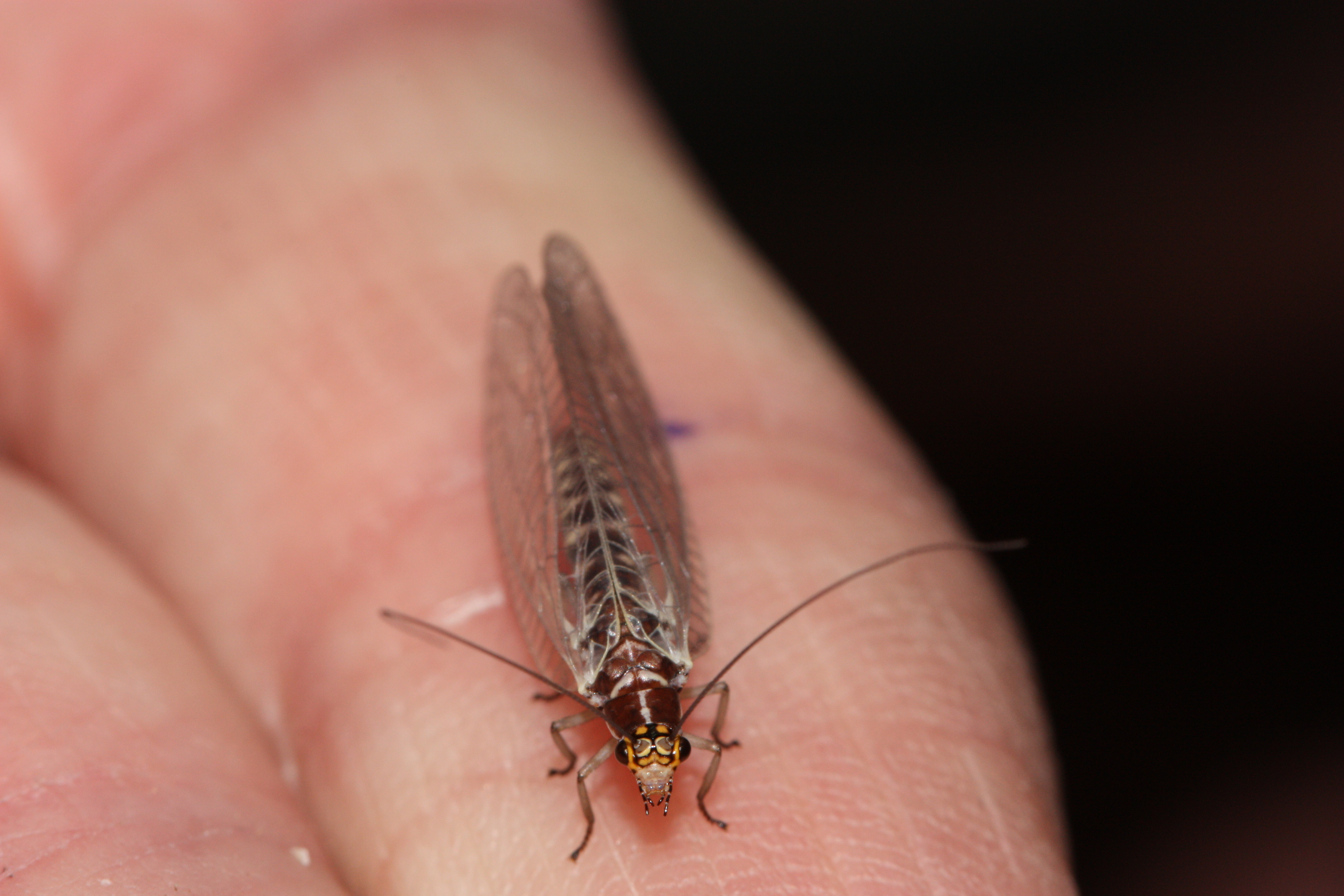
- Nothochrysa californica from Oregon

Scientific classification
- Kingdom: Animalia
- Phylum: Arthropoda
- Class: Insecta
- Order: Neuroptera
- Family: Chrysopidae
- Genus: Nothochrysa
- Species: N. californica

Binomial name
- Nothochrysa californica Banks, 1892

= Nothochrysa californica =

Species of lacewing

Nothochrysa californica, the San Francisco lacewing, is a species of green lacewing in the family Chrysopidae. It is found in North America.
