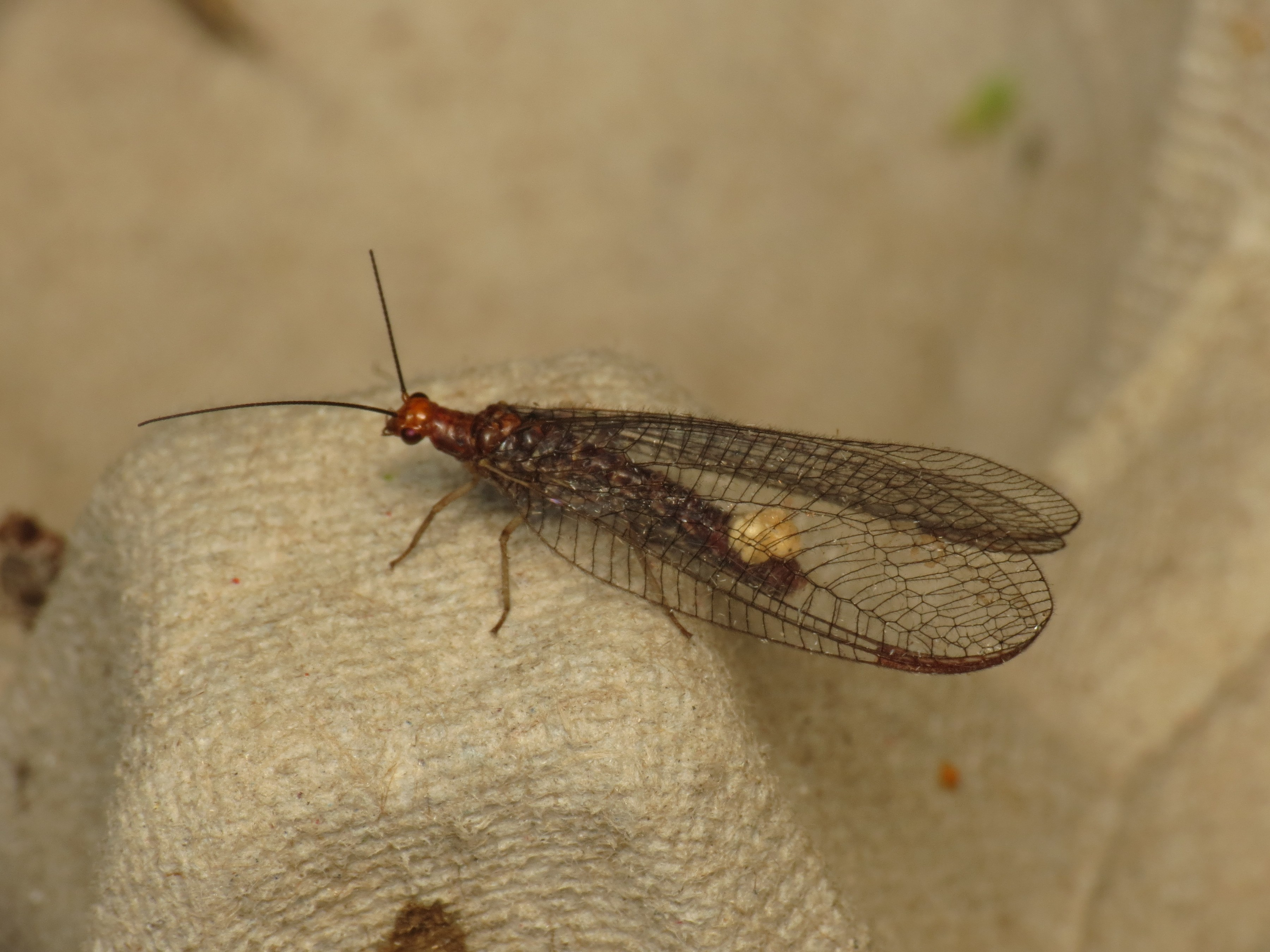
- Nothochrysa capitata

Scientific classification
- Domain: Eukaryota
- Kingdom: Animalia
- Phylum: Arthropoda
- Class: Insecta
- Order: Neuroptera
- Family: Chrysopidae
- Subfamily: Nothochrysinae
- Genus: Nothochrysa; McLachlan, 1868

= Nothochrysa =

Genus of lacewings

Nothochrysa is a genus of green lacewings in the family Chrysopidae. There are about 10 described species in Nothochrysa.

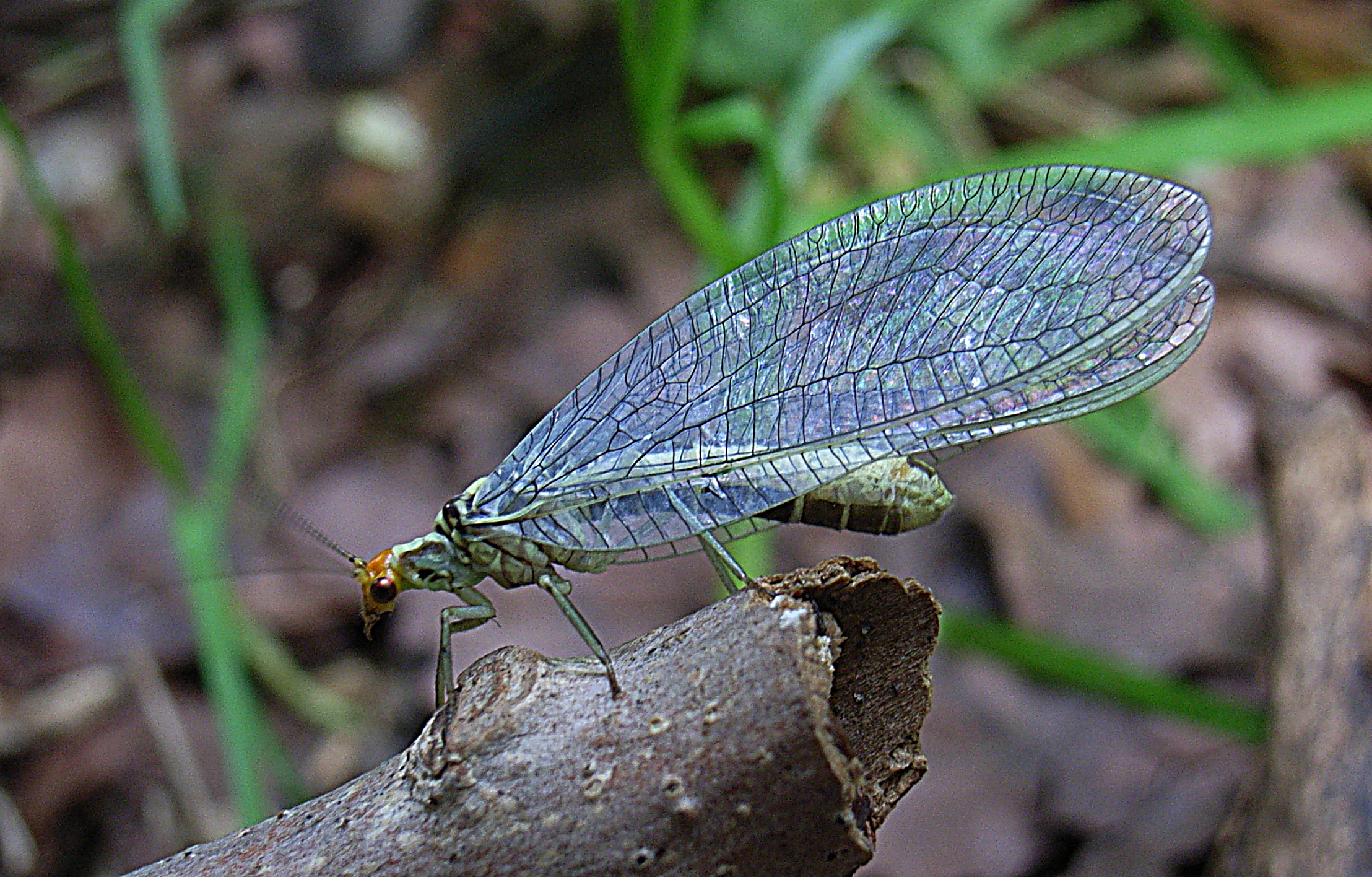
Nothochrysa fulviceps

== Species ==
These 9 species belong to the genus Nothochrysa:

- Nothochrysa californica Banks, 1892 (San Francisco lacewing)
- Nothochrysa capitata (Fabricius, 1793)
- Nothochrysa fulviceps (Stephens, 1836)
- Nothochrysa indigena Needham, 1909
- Nothochrysa polemia Navás, 1917
- Nothochrysa sinica C.-k. Yang, 1986
- Nothochrysa turcica Kovanci & Canbulat, 2007
- † Nothochrysa praeclara Statz, 1936
- † Nothochrysa stampieni Nel & Séméria, 1986
