= List of Aphidinae genera =

These 283 genera belong to Aphidinae, a subfamily of aphids in the family Aphididae. There are at least 3,200 described species in Aphidinae.

== Aphidinae genera ==
- Abstrusomyzus Jensen & Stoetzel, 1999
- Acaudella Nevsky, 1929
- Acaudinum Börner, 1930
- Acuticauda Hille Ris Lambers, 1956
- Acutosiphon Basu, Ghosh & Raychaudhuri, 1970
- Acyrthosiphon Mordvilko, 1914
- Akkaia Takahashi, 1919
- Aleurosiphon Takahashi, 1966
- Allocotaphis Börner, 1950
- Alphitoaphis Hottes, 1926
- Amegosiphon
- Ammiaphis Börner, 1952
- Amphicercidus Oestlund, 1923
- Amphorophora Buckton, 1876
- Amphorosiphon Hille Ris Lambers, 1949
- Anaulacorthum Ghosh & Raychaudhuri, 1972
- Andinaphis Mier Durante, Ortego & Nieto Nafría, 1997
- Anthracosiphon Hille Ris Lambers, 1947
- Antimacrosiphon Zhang, 1998
- Anuraphis Del Guercio, 1907
- Anuromyzus Shaposhnikov, 1959
- Aphidura Hille Ris Lambers, 1956
- Aphiduromyzus Umarov & Ibraimova, 1967
- Aphis Linnaeus, 1758
- Aphthargelia Hottes, 1958
- Artemisaphis Knowlton & Roberts, 1947
- Asiphonaphis Wilson & Davis, 1919
- Aspidaphis Gillette, 1917
- Aspidophorodon Verma, 1967
- Atarsos Gillette, 1911
- Aulacophoroides Tao, 1976
- Aulacorthum Mordvilko, 1914
- Avicennina Narzikulov, 1957
- Berberidaphis
- Bipersona Hottes, 1926
- Blackmania Kanturski & Wieczorek, 2015
- Blanchardaphis Ortego, Nieto Nafría & Mier Durante, 1998
- Brachycaudus van der Goot, 1913
- Brachycolus Buckton, 1879
- Brachycorynella Aizenberg, 1956
- Brachymyzus Basu, 1964
- Brachysiphoniella Takahashi, 1921
- Brachyunguis Das, 1918
- Braggia Gillette & Palmer, 1929
- Brevicoryne Das, 1915
- Brevicorynella Nevsky, 1928
- Brevisiphonaphis Stekolshchikov & Qiao, 2008
- Burundiaphis Remaudière, 1985
- Cachryphora Oestlund, 1923
- Campanulaphis Kadyrbekov, 2016
- Capitophorus van der Goot, 1913
- Capraphis Mier Durante, Ortego & Nieto Nafría, 2009
- Carolinaia Wilson, 1911
- Casimira Eastop, 1966
- Catamergus Oestlund, 1923
- Cavariella Del Guercio, 1911
- Cedoaphis Oestlund, 1923
- Ceruraphis Börner, 1926
- Chaetomyzus Ghosh & Raychaudhuri, 1962
- Chaetosiphon Mordvilko, 1914
- Chaitaphis Nevsky, 1928
- Chakrabartiaphis Remaudiere, 2001
- Chitinosiphon
- Chomaphis Mordvilko, 1928
- Chondrillobium Bozhko, 1961
- Chusiphuncula Zhang, 1998
- Clypeoaphis Soliman, 1938
- Codonopsimyzus Lee, 2002
- Coloradoa Wilson, 1910
- Corylobium Mordvilko, 1914
- Cryptaphis Hille Ris Lambers, 1947
- Cryptomyzus Oestlund, 1923
- Cryptosiphum Buckton, 1879
- Cyrtomophorodon Zhang & Qiao, 2000
- Davatchiaphis Remaudière, 1964
- Decorosiphon Börner, 1939
- Defractosiphon Börner, 1950
- Delfinoia Nieto Nafría & Mier Durante, 2017
- Delphiniobium Mordvilko, 1914
- Diatomyzus Heie, 1970
- Diuraphis Aizenberg, 1935
- Durocapillata Knowlton, 1927
- Dysaphis Börner, 1931
- Eastopiella Kadyrbekov, 2001
- Eichinaphis
- Elatobium Mordvilko, 1914
- Eomacrosiphon Hille Ris Lambers, 1958
- Epameibaphis Oestlund, 1923
- Ephedraphis Hille Ris Lambers, 1959
- Ericaphis Börner, 1939
- Ericolophium Tao, 1963
- Eucarazzia Del Guercio, 1921
- Eumaerosiphum
- Eumyzus Shinji, 1929
- Ferusaphis Zhang, Chen, Zhong & Li, 1999
- Flabellomicrosiphum Gillette & Palmer, 1932
- Fullawaya Essig, 1912
- Gibbomyzus Nieto Nafría, Pérez Hidalgo, Martínez-Torres & Villalobos Muller, 2013
- Glendenningia MacGillivray, 1954
- Gredinia Pashtshenko, 2000
- Gypsoaphis Oestlund, 1923
- Hallaphis Doncaster, 1956
- Hayhurstia Del Guercio, 1917
- Hillerislambersia Basu, 1968
- Holmania Szelegiewicz, 1964
- Hyadaphis Kirkaldy, 1904
- Hyalomyzus Richards, 1958
- Hyalopteroides Theobald, 1916
- Hyalopterus Koch, 1854
- Hydaphias Börner, 1930
- Hydronaphis Shinji, 1922
- Hyperomyzus Börner, 1933
- Hysteroneura Davis, 1919
- Idiopterus Davis, 1909
- Illinoia Wilson, 1910
- Impatientinum Mordvilko, 1914
- Indoidiopterus Chakrabarti, Ghosh & Raychaudhuri, 1972
- Indomasonaphis Verma, 1971
- Indomegoura Hille Ris Lambers, 1958
- Indomyzus Ghosh, Ghosh & Raychaudhuri, 1971
- Ipuka van Harten & Ilharco, 1976
- Iranaphias Remaudière & Davatchi, 1959
- Jacksonia Theobald, 1923
- Kaochiaoja Tao, 1963
- Karamicrosiphum Zhang, 1998
- Klimaszewskia Szelegiewicz, 1979
- Kugegania Eastop, 1955
- Landisaphis Knowlton & Ma, 1949
- Lehrius Gredina, 1995
- Lepidaphis Kadyrbekov, Renxin & Shao, 2002
- Linaphis Zhang, 1981
- Linosiphon Börner, 1950
- Liosomaphis Walker, 1868
- Lipamyzodes Heinze, 1960
- Lipaphis Mordvilko, 1928
- Longicaudinus Hille Ris Lambers, 1965
- Longicaudus van der Goot, 1913
- Longisiphoniella Chakrabarti, Saha & Mandal, 1988
- Loniceraphis Narzikulov, 1962
- Macchiatiella Del Guercio, 1909
- Macromyzella Ghosh, Basu & Raychaudhuri, 1977
- Macromyzus Takahashi, 1960
- Macrosiphoniella Del Guercio, 1911
- Macrotrichaphis Miyazaki, 1971
- Mastopoda Oestlund, 1886
- Matsumuraja Schumacher, 1921
- Megoura Buckton, 1876
- Megourella Hille Ris Lambers, 1949
- Megourina Hille Ris Lambers, 1974
- Meguroleucon Miyazaki, 1971
- Melanaphis van der Goot, 1917
- Metopeuraphis Narzikulov & Smailova, 1975
- Metopeurum Mordvilko, 1914
- Metopolophium Mordvilko, 1914
- Micraphis Takahashi, 1931
- Microlophium Mordvilko, 1914
- Micromyzella Eastop, 1955
- Micromyzodium David, 1959
- Micromyzus van der Goot, 1917
- Microparsus Patch, 1909
- Microsiphoniella Hille Ris Lambers, 1947
- Microsiphum Cholodkovsky, 1902
- Misturaphis Robinson, 1967
- Miyazakia Stekolshchikov, 2014
- Mordvilkoiella Shaposhnikov, 1964
- Muscaphis Börner, 1933
- Myzaphis van der Goot, 1913
- Myzodium Börner, 1950
- Myzosiphum Tao, 1964
- Myzotoxoptera Theobald, 1927
- Myzus Passerini, 1860
- Nasonovia Mordvilko, 1914
- Nearctaphis Shaposhnikov, 1950
- Neoamphorophora Mason, 1924
- Neomariaella Szwedo & Osiadacz, 2010
- Neomyzus van der Goot, 1915
- Neopterocomma Hille Ris Lambers, 1935
- Neorhopalomyzus Tao, 1963
- Neosappaphis Hille Ris Lambers, 1959
- Neotoxoptera Theobald, 1915
- Nevadaphis Drews, 1941
- Nietonafriella Ortego, 1998
- Nigritergaphis Zhang, Lou & Qiao, 2013
- Nippodysaphis Hille Ris Lambers, 1965
- Nudisiphon Chakrabarti & Bhattacharya, 1982
- Obtusicauda Soliman, 1927
- Oedisiphum van der Goot, 1917
- Ossiannilssonia Hille Ris Lambers, 1952
- Ovatomyzus Hille Ris Lambers, 1947
- Ovatus van der Goot, 1913
- Paczoskia Mordvilko, 1914
- Paducia Hottes & Frison, 1931
- Papulaphis Robinson, 1966
- Paradoxaphis Sunde, 1988
- Paramyzus Börner, 1933
- Paraphorodon Tseng & Tao, 1938
- Pehuenchaphis Mier Durante, Nieto Nafría & Ortego, 2003
- Pentalonia Coquerel, 1859
- Pentamyzus Hille Ris Lambers, 1966
- Phorodon Passerini, 1860
- Pleotrichophorus Börner, 1930
- Plocamaphis Oestlund, 1923
- Polytrichaphis Miyazaki, 1971
- Protaphis Börner, 1952
- Pseudacaudella Börner, 1950
- Pseudamphorophora Heie, 1967
- Pseudaphis Hille Ris Lambers, 1954
- Pseudasiphonaphis Robinson, 1965
- Pseudobrevicoryne Heinze, 1960
- Pseudocercidis Richards, 1961
- Pseudoepameibaphis Gillette & Palmer, 1932
- Pseudomegoura Shinji, 1929
- Pseudotoxoptera Zhang & Qiao, 1999
- Pterocomma Buckton, 1879
- Raychaudhuriaphis
- Rhinariaphis Kanturski & Stekolshchikov, 2018
- Rhodobium Hille Ris Lambers, 1947
- Rhododendraphis Barjadze & Özdemir, 2014
- Rhopalomyzus Mordvilko, 1921
- Rhopalosiphoninus Baker, 1920
- Rhopalosiphum Koch, 1854
- Richardsaphis Kanturski & Barjadze, 2018
- Roepkea Hille Ris Lambers, 1935
- Rostratusaphis Fang & Qiao, 2009
- Ryoichitakahashia Hille Ris Lambers, 1965
- Sanbornia Baker, 1920
- Sappaphis Matsumura, 1918
- Schizaphis Börner, 1931
- Scleromyzus Basu, Ghosh & Raychaudhuri, 1976
- Semiaphis van der Goot, 1913
- Seneciobium Remaudière, 1954
- Shinjia Takahashi, 1938
- Sinomegoura Takahashi, 1960
- Siphonatrophia Swain, 1918
- Sitobion Mordvilko, 1914
- Smiela Mordvilko, 1948
- Sorbaphis Shaposhnikov, 1950
- Spatulophorus F.P.Muller, 1958
- Spinaphis
- Staegeriella Hille Ris Lambers, 1947
- Staticobium Mordvilko, 1914
- Stellariopsis Szelegiewicz, 1969
- Subacyrthosiphon Hille Ris Lambers, 1947
- Subovatomyzus Basu, 1964
- Swirskiaphis Hille Ris Lambers, 1966
- Taiwanomyzus Tao, 1963
- Tauricaphis
- Tenuilongiaphis Zhang, 1994
- Thalictrophorus Zhang & Qiao, 2000
- Titanosiphon Nevsky, 1928
- Toxopterina Börner, 1940
- Tricaudatus Narzikulov, 1957
- Trichosiphonaphis Takahashi, 1922
- Tshernovaia Holman & Szelegiewicz, 1964
- Tubaphis Hille Ris Lambers, 1947
- Tuberoaphis Tseng & Tao, 1938
- Tuberocephalus Shinji, 1929
- Tumoranuraphis Zhang, Chen, Zhong & Li, 1999
- Turanoleucon Kadyrbekov, 2002
- Ucrimyzus Mier Durante & Pérez Hidalgo, 2013
- Uhlmannia Börner, 1952
- Uroleucon Mordvilko, 1914
- Utamphorophora Knowlton, 1946
- Vesiculaphis Del Guercio, 1911
- Viburnaphis Pashtshenko, 1988
- Vietaphis Su, Jiang & Qiao, 2014
- Volutaphis Börner, 1939
- Wahlgreniella Hille Ris Lambers, 1949
- Xenosiphonaphis Takahashi, 1961
- Xerobion Nevsky, 1928
- Zinia Shaposhnikov, 1950
- † Anthemidaphis Tashev, 1967
- † Aphidocallis Kononova, 1977
- † Halajaphis Wegierek, 1996
- † Helosiphon Leclant, 1969
- † Himalayaphis Ghosh & Verma, 1973
- † Huaxiaphis Hong, 2002
- † Indiaphis Basu, 1969
- † Liaoaphis Hong, 2002
- Macrosiphum Passerini, 1860
- † Myzakkaia Basu, 1969
- † Nigrosiphum Heie, 2002
- † Szelegiewicziella Holman, 1974
