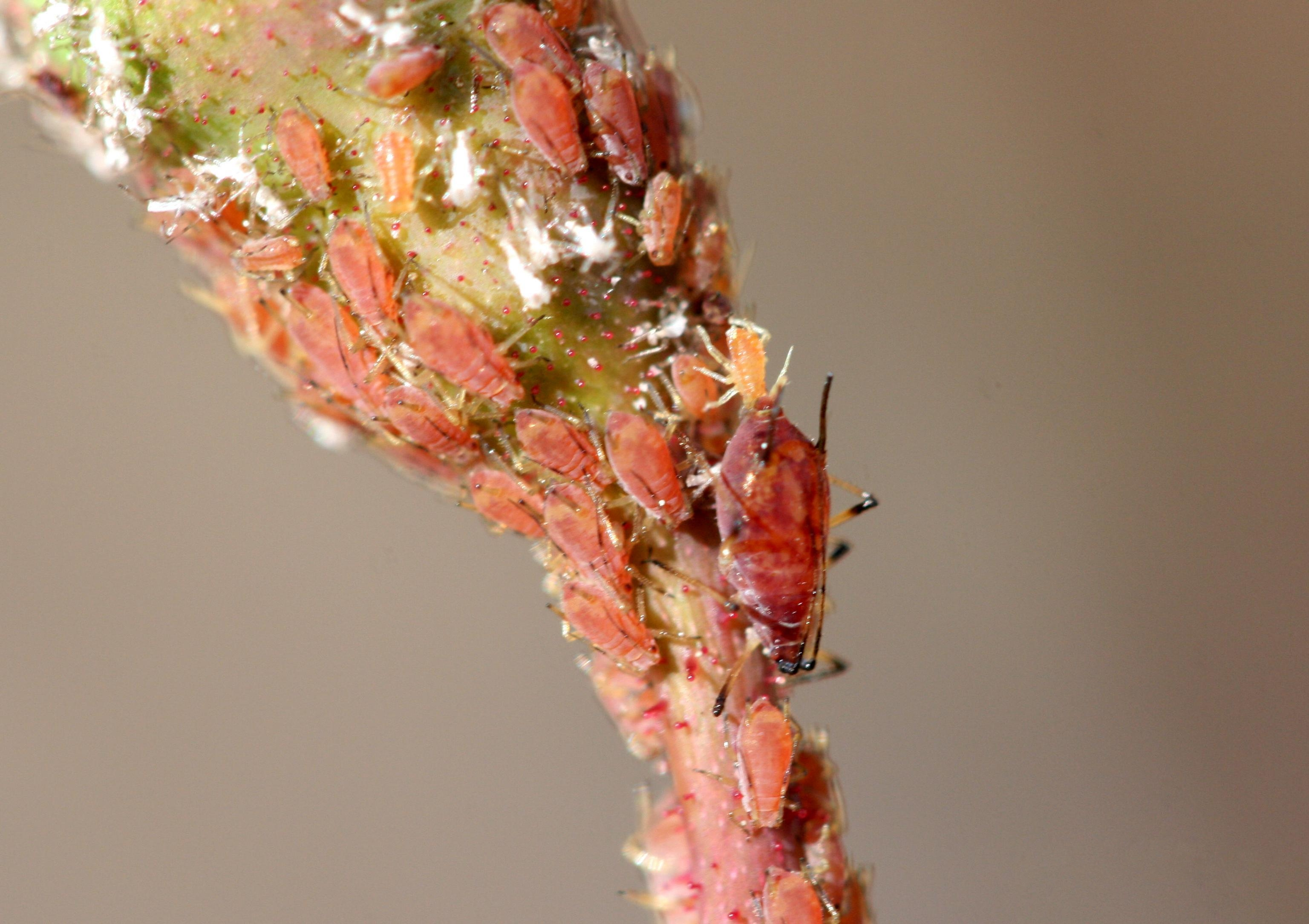
- Macrosiphum rosae

Scientific classification
- Domain: Eukaryota
- Kingdom: Animalia
- Phylum: Arthropoda
- Class: Insecta
- Order: Hemiptera
- Suborder: Sternorrhyncha
- Infraorder: Aphidomorpha
- Superfamily: Aphidoidea
- Family: Aphididae
- Subfamily: Aphidinae
- Tribe: Macrosiphini; Wilson, 1910

Genera
- See text

= Macrosiphini =

Tribe of true bugs

Macrosiphini is a tribe of aphids in the subfamily Aphidinae.

== Genera ==
The tribe includes the following genera, listed in alphabetical order:

Abstrusomyzus - Acaudella - Acaudinum - Acuticauda - Acutosiphon - Acyrthosiphon - Akkaia - Allocotaphis - Alphitoaphis - Amegosiphon - Ammiaphis - Amphicercidus - Amphorophora - Amphorosiphon - Anaulacorthum - Anthracosiphon - Antimacrosiphon - Anuraphis - Anuromyzus - Aphidura - Aphiduromyzus - Aphthargelia - Artemisaphis - Aspidaphis - Aspidophorodon - Atarsos - Aulacophoroides - Aulacorthum - Avicennina - Berberidaphis - Bipersona - Blanchardaphis - Brachycaudus - Brachycolus - Brachycorynella - Brachymyzus - Brachysiphoniella - Brevicoryne - Brevicorynella - Brevisiphonaphis - Burundiaphis - Cachryphora - Capitophorus - Capraphis - Carolinaia - Catamergus - Cavariella - Cedoaphis - Ceruraphis - Chaetomyzus - Chaetosiphon - Chaitaphis - Chakrabartiaphis - Chitinosiphon - Chondrillobium - Chusiphuncula - Clypeoaphis - Codonopsimyzus - Coloradoa - Corylobium - Cryptaphis - Cryptomyzus - Cyrtomophorodon - Davatchiaphis - Decorosiphon - Defractosiphon - Delphiniobium - Diphorodon - Diuraphis - Durocapillata - Dysaphis - Eichinaphis - Elatobium - Eomacrosiphon - Epameibaphis - Ericaphis - Ericolophium - Eucarazzia - Eumaerosiphum - Eumyzus - Ferusaphis - Flabellomicrosiphum - Fullawaya - Gibbomyzus - Glendenningia - Gredinia - Gypsoaphis - Halajaphis† - Hayhurstia - Helosiphon - Hillerislambersia - Himalayaphis - Holmania - Hyadaphis - Hyalomyzus - Hyalopteroides - Hydaphias - Hydronaphis - Hyperomyzus - Idiopterus - Illinoia - Impatientinum - Indiaphis - Indoidiopterus - Indomasonaphis - Indomegoura - Indomyzus - Ipuka - Iranaphias - Jacksonia - Kaochiaoja - Karamicrosiphum - Klimaszewskia - Kugegania - Landisaphis - Lehrius - Lepidaphis - Linaphis - Linosiphon - Liosomaphis - Lipamyzodes - Lipaphis - Longicaudinus - Longicaudus - Longisiphoniella - Loniceraphis - Macchiatiella - Macromyzella - Macromyzus - Macrosiphoniella - Macrosiphum - Macrotrichaphis - Margituberculatus - Mastopoda - Matsumuraja - Megoura - Megourella - Megourina - Meguroleucon - Metopeuraphis - Metopeurum - Metopolophium - Micraphis - Microlophium - Micromyzella - Micromyzodium - Micromyzus - Microparsus - Microsiphoniella - Microsiphum - Muscaphis - Myzakkaia - Myzaphis - Myzodium - Myzosiphum - Myzotoxoptera - Myzus - Nasonovia - Nearctaphis - Neoamphorophora - Neomacromyzus - Neomariaella - Neomyzus - Neopterocomma - Neorhopalomyzus - Neosappaphis - Neotoxoptera - Nietonafriella - Nigritergaphis - Nippodysaphis - Nudisiphon - Obtusicauda - Oedisiphum - Ossiannilssonia - Ovatomyzus - Ovatus - Paczoskia - Paducia - Papulaphis - Paramyzus - Paraphorodon - Pentalonia - Pentamyzus - Phorodon - Pleotrichophorus - Plocamaphis - Polytrichaphis - Pseudacaudella - Pseudamphorophora† - Pseudaphis - Pseudobrevicoryne - Pseudocercidis - Pseudoepameibaphis - Pseudomegoura - Pterocomma - Raychaudhuriaphis - Rhodobium - Rhopalomyzus - Rhopalosiphoninus - Roepkea - Rostratusaphis - Sappaphis - Scleromyzus - Semiaphis - Shinjia - Sinomegoura - Sitobion - Smiela - Sorbaphis - Spatulophorus - Spinaphis - Staegeriella - Staticobium - Stellariopsis - Subacyrthosiphon - Subovatomyzus - Taiwanomyzus - Tauricaphis - Tenuilongiaphis - Thalictrophorus - Titanosiphon - Tricaudatus - Trichosiphonaphis - Tshernovaia - Tubaphis - Tuberoaphis - Tuberocephalus - Tumoranuraphis - Turanoleucon - Ucrimyzus - Uhlmannia - Uroleucon - Utamphorophora - Vesiculaphis - Viburnaphis - Volutaphis - Wahlgreniella - Xenosiphonaphis - Zinia

== Gallery ==
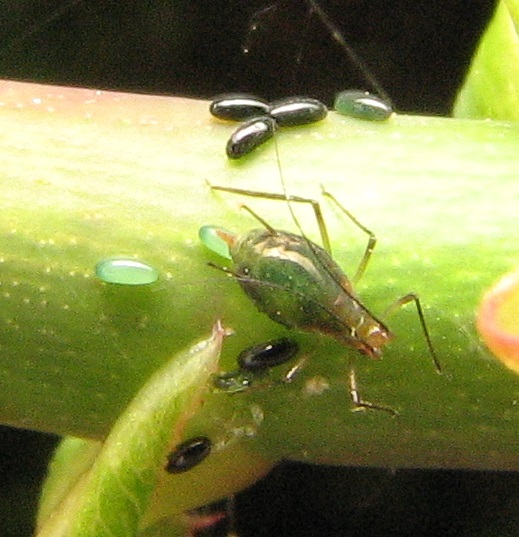
Macrosiphum laying eggs on rose bush

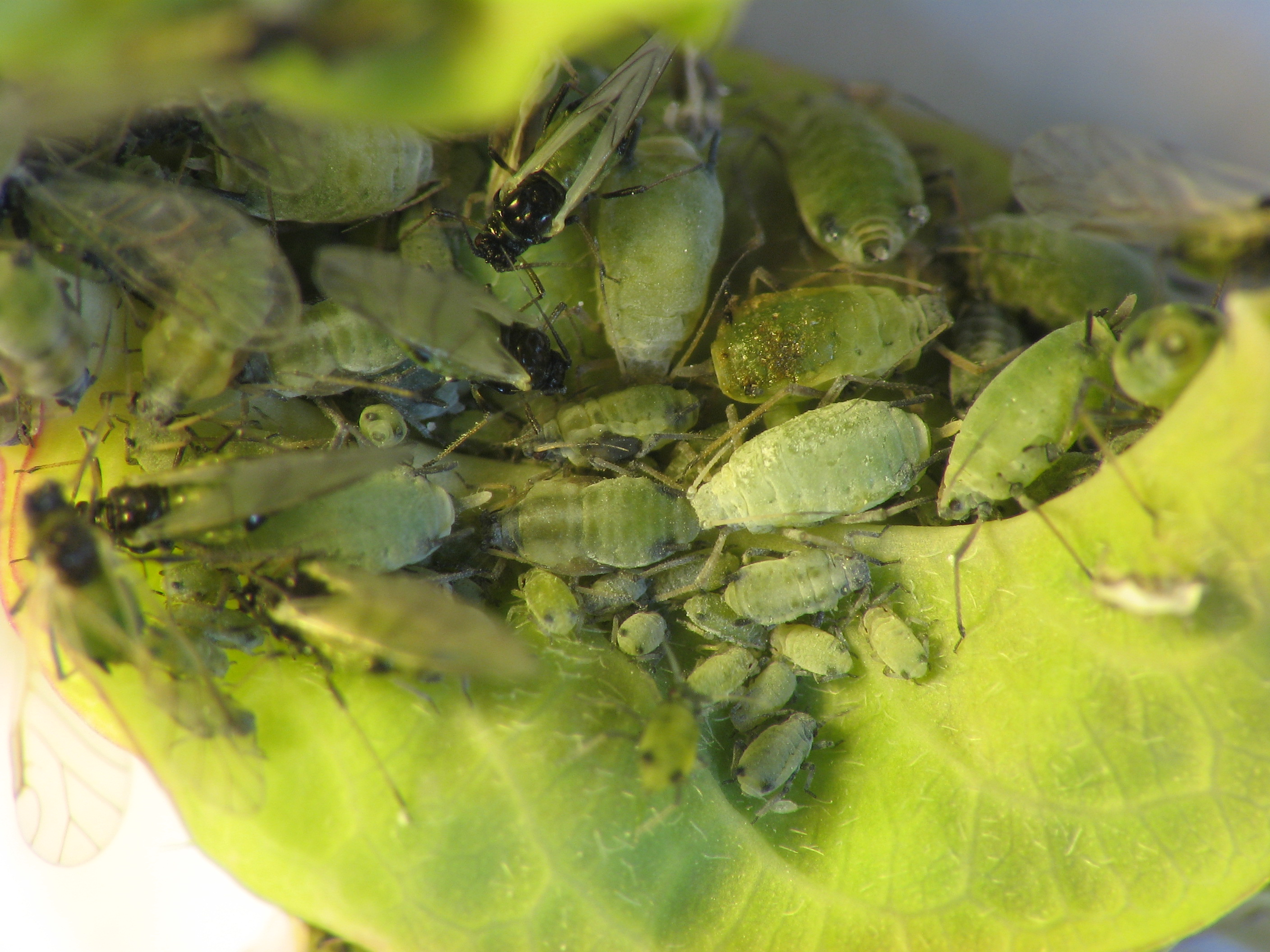
Hyadaphis on trumpet honeysuckle

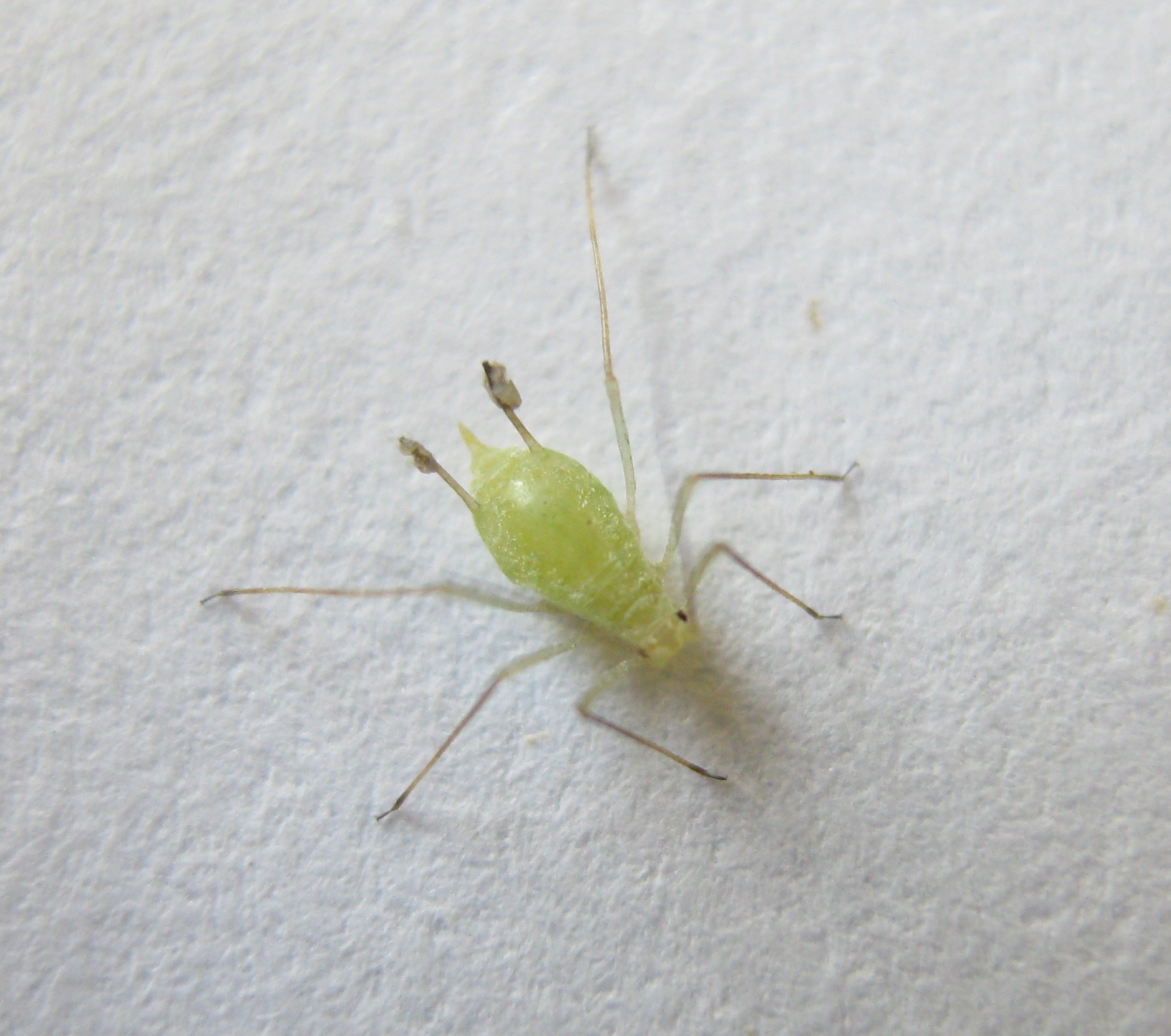
Illinoia liriodendri from the underside of leaf of tulip tree (Liriodendron tulipifera)
