= Anuromyzus acantholimonis =

Scientific classification
- Kingdom: Animalia
- Phylum: Arthropoda
- Clade: Pancrustacea
- Class: Insecta
- Order: Hemiptera
- Suborder: Sternorrhyncha
- Family: Aphididae
- Genus: Anuromyzus
- Species: A. acantholimonis

Binomial name
- Anuromyzus acantholimonis Kök, Barjadze & Stekolshchikov, 2026

Species of aphid

Anuromyzus acantholimonis is a species of aphid belonging to the tribe Macrosiphini in the family Aphididae. The species was discovered in the Mount Ida region of Balıkesir Province, Turkey, and was first scientifically described in 2026 by Şahin Kök, Shalva Barjadze and Andrey V. Stekolshchikov.

Acantholimon ulicinum, the host plant of Anuromyzus acantholimonis

The species was found on Acantholimon ulicinum, at an elevation of 1,705 m (5,594 ft) on Sarıkız Peak in the Mount Ida range. It was scientifically described from wingless, viviparous females. It is the second known species of the genus Anuromyzus, which previously contained only Anuromyzus cotoneasteris.
