= Spruce aphid =

Spruce aphid may refer to multiple aphids or aphid-like species found on spruce trees:

- Elatobium abietinum, a true aphid species
- Certain species of Adelgidae, a family closely related to aphids
