= Pentalonia kalimpongensis =

Scientific classification
- Domain: Eukaryota
- Kingdom: Animalia
- Phylum: Arthropoda
- Class: Insecta
- Order: Hemiptera
- Suborder: Sternorrhyncha
- Family: Aphididae
- Genus: Pentalonia
- Species: P. kalimpongensis

Binomial name
- Pentalonia kalimpongensis (Basu, 1968)

Synonyms
- Micromyzus kalimpongensis Basu, 1968

Species of true bug

Pentalonia kalimpongensis is an aphid in the order Hemiptera. It is a true bug and sucks sap from plants.
