= Coloradoa =

Scientific classification
- Domain: Eukaryota
- Kingdom: Animalia
- Phylum: Arthropoda
- Class: Insecta
- Order: Hemiptera
- Suborder: Sternorrhyncha
- Family: Aphididae
- Tribe: Macrosiphini
- Genus: Coloradoa; Wilson, 1910

Species
- C. absinthiella; C. absinthii; C. achillae; C. angelicae; C. artemisiae; C. campestris; C. rufomaculata; C. tanacetina

Genus of true bugs

Coloradoa is a genus of aphids, in the subfamily Aphidinae.
