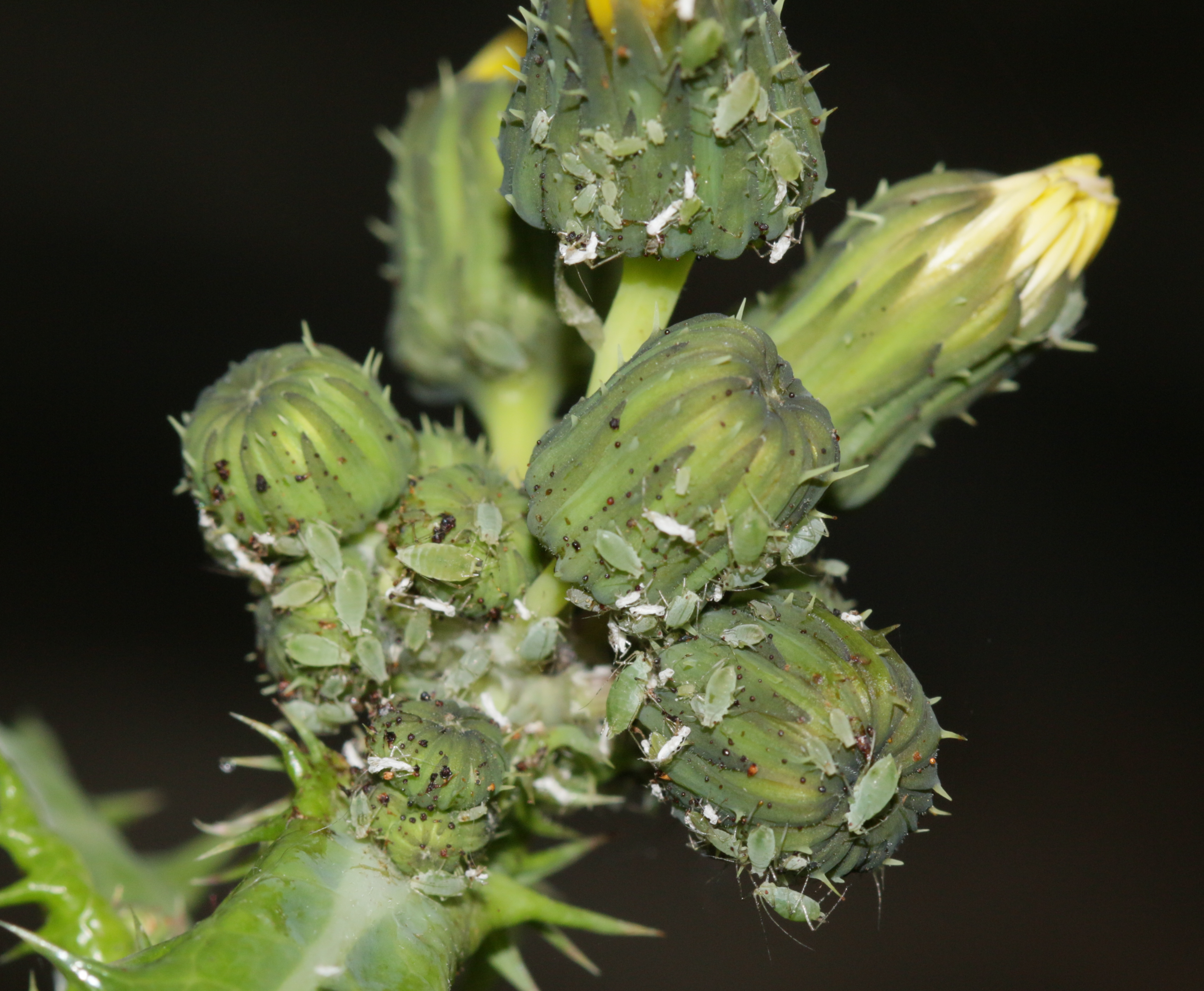
- Hyperomyzus lactucae

Scientific classification
- Domain: Eukaryota
- Kingdom: Animalia
- Phylum: Arthropoda
- Class: Insecta
- Order: Hemiptera
- Suborder: Sternorrhyncha
- Family: Aphididae
- Subfamily: Aphidinae
- Tribe: Macrosiphini
- Genus: Hyperomyzus; Börner, 1933

= Hyperomyzus =

Genus of true bugs

Hyperomyzus is a genus of aphids in the family Aphididae. There are more than 20 described species in Hyperomyzus.

== Species ==
These 21 species belong to the genus Hyperomyzus:

- Hyperomyzus accidentalis (Knowlton, 1929)
- Hyperomyzus carduellinus (Theobald, 1915)
- Hyperomyzus gansuensis (Zhang, Chen, Zhong & Li, 1999)
- Hyperomyzus hieracii (Börner, 1939)
- Hyperomyzus inflatus (Richards, 1962)
- Hyperomyzus lactucae (Linnaeus, 1758) (blackcurrant—sowthistle aphid)
- Hyperomyzus lampsanae (Börner, 1932)
- Hyperomyzus nabali (Oestlund, 1886)
- Hyperomyzus niger (Baker, 1934)
- Hyperomyzus nigricornis (Knowlton, 1927)
- Hyperomyzus pallidus Hille Ris Lambers, 1935
- Hyperomyzus petiolaris (Knowlton & Allen, 1945)
- Hyperomyzus picridis (Börner, 1916)
- Hyperomyzus pullatus Hall & Garraway, 2009
- Hyperomyzus rhinanthi (Schouteden, 1903)
- Hyperomyzus ribiellus (Davis, 1919)
- Hyperomyzus sandilandicus (Robinson, 1974)
- Hyperomyzus sinilactucae Zhang, 1980
- Hyperomyzus thorsteinni Stroyan, 1960
- Hyperomyzus yulongshanensis Zhang, Zhong & Zhang, 1992
- Hyperomyzus zirnitsi Hille Ris Lambers, 1952
