= Anuraphis =

Scientific classification
- Kingdom: Animalia
- Phylum: Arthropoda
- Clade: Pancrustacea
- Class: Insecta
- Order: Hemiptera
- Suborder: Sternorrhyncha
- Family: Aphididae
- Subfamily: Aphidinae
- Tribe: Macrosiphini
- Genus: Anuraphis; Del Guercio, 1907

Synonyms
- Amnraphis; Aniraphis; Anouraphis Gaumont, 1929

Genus of true bugs

Anuraphis is a genus of true bugs belonging to the family Aphididae.

The genus was first described by Del Guercio in 1907.

The genus has almost cosmopolitan distribution.

Species:

- Anuraphis aegyptiaca
- Anuraphis catonii
- Anuraphis farfarae
- Anuraphis helichrysi
- Anuraphis middletonii
- Anuraphis subterranea
