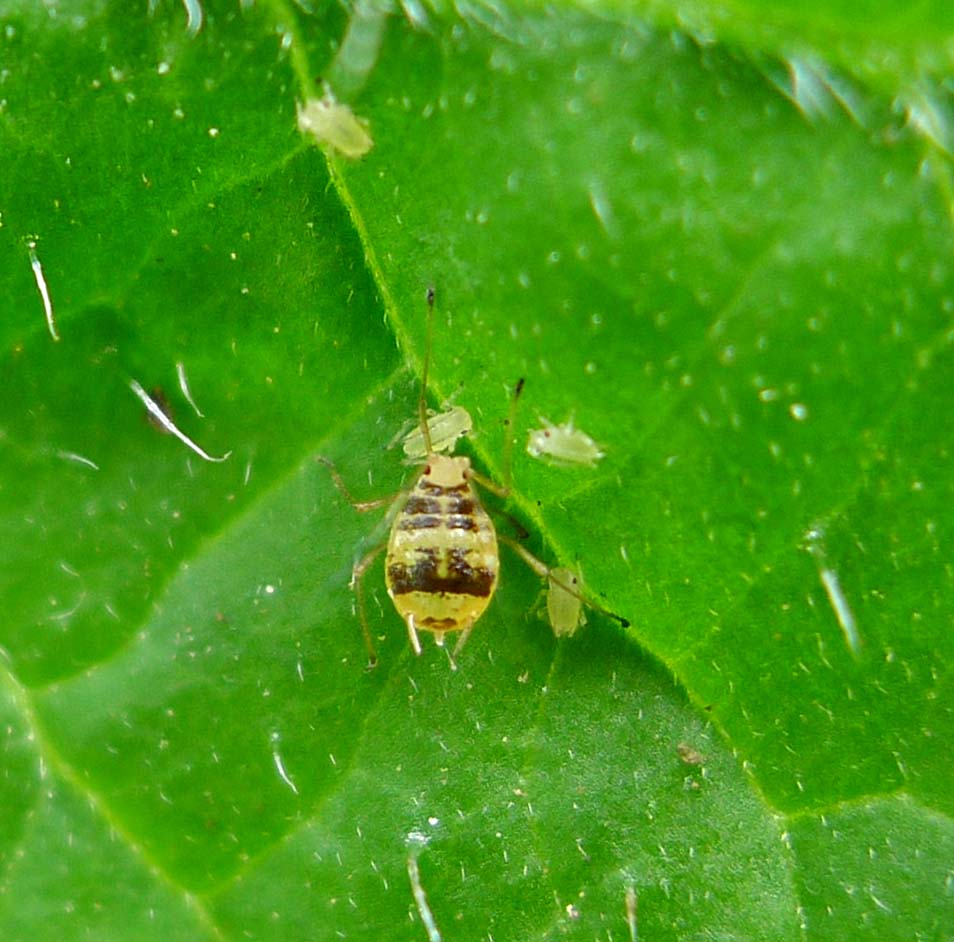
- Aulacorthum

Scientific classification
- Domain: Eukaryota
- Kingdom: Animalia
- Phylum: Arthropoda
- Class: Insecta
- Order: Hemiptera
- Suborder: Sternorrhyncha
- Family: Aphididae
- Subfamily: Aphidinae
- Tribe: Macrosiphini
- Genus: Aulacorthum; Mordvilko, 1914

= Aulacorthum =

Genus of true bugs

Aulacorthum is a genus of true bugs belonging to the family Aphididae.

The genus was first described by Mordvilko in 1914.

The genus has cosmopolitan distribution.

== Species ==
These species belong to the genus Aulacorthum:

- Aulacorthum aegopodii Börner, 1939
- Aulacorthum albimagnoliae Lee, 2006
- Aulacorthum artemisiphaga Lee, Havelka & Lee, 2011
- Aulacorthum asteriphagum Lee, Kim & Lee, 2009
- Aulacorthum asteris Takahashi, 1965
- Aulacorthum cercidiphylli (Matsumura, 1918)
- Aulacorthum cirsicola (Takahashi, 1923)
- Aulacorthum cornaceae Ghosh, 1969
- Aulacorthum corydalicola Lee, Kim & Lee, 2009
- Aulacorthum cylactis Börner, 1942
- Aulacorthum dasi Ghosh, Basu & Raychaudhuri, 1970
- Aulacorthum dorsatum Richards, 1967
- Aulacorthum esakii (Takahashi, 1924)
- Aulacorthum euphorbophagum Zhang, Chen, Zhong & Li, 1999
- Aulacorthum flavum F.P.Muller, 1958
- Aulacorthum glechomae Takahashi, 1965
- Aulacorthum ibotum (Essig & Kuwana, 1918)
- Aulacorthum ixeridis Lee, Havelka & Lee, 2009
- Aulacorthum kerriae
- Aulacorthum knautiae Heie, 1960
- Aulacorthum kuwanai (Takahashi, 1933)
- Aulacorthum langei Börner, 1939
- Aulacorthum ligularicola Lee, 2002
- Aulacorthum linderae (Shinji, 1922)
- Aulacorthum majanthemi Müller, 1956
- Aulacorthum mediapallidum Su & Qiao, 2011
- Aulacorthum muradachi
- Aulacorthum myriopteroni (Zhang, 1980)
- Aulacorthum nepetifolii Miyazaki, 1968
- Aulacorthum palustre Hille Ris Lambers, 1947
- Aulacorthum perillae (Shinji, 1924)
- Aulacorthum phytolaccae Miyazaki, 1968
- Aulacorthum pterinigrum Richards, 1972
- Aulacorthum rhamni Ghosh, Ghosh & Raychaudhuri, 1971
- Aulacorthum rubifoliae (Shinji, 1922)
- Aulacorthum rufum Hille Ris Lambers, 1947
- Aulacorthum sclerodorsi (Kumar & Burkhardt, 1971)
- Aulacorthum sedens F.P.Muller, 1966
- Aulacorthum sensoriatum (David, Narayanan & Rajasingh, 1971)
- Aulacorthum smilacis Takahashi, 1965
- Aulacorthum solani (Kaltenbach, 1843) (foxglove aphid)
- Aulacorthum speyeri Börner, 1939
- Aulacorthum spinacaudatum (Kumar & Burkhardt, 1971)
- Aulacorthum syringae (Matsumura, 1918)
- Aulacorthum takahashii (Mason, 1925)
- Aulacorthum vaccinii Hille Ris Lambers, 1952
- Aulacorthum vandenboschi Hille Ris Lambers, 1967
- Aulacorthum watanabei (Miyazaki, 1971)
