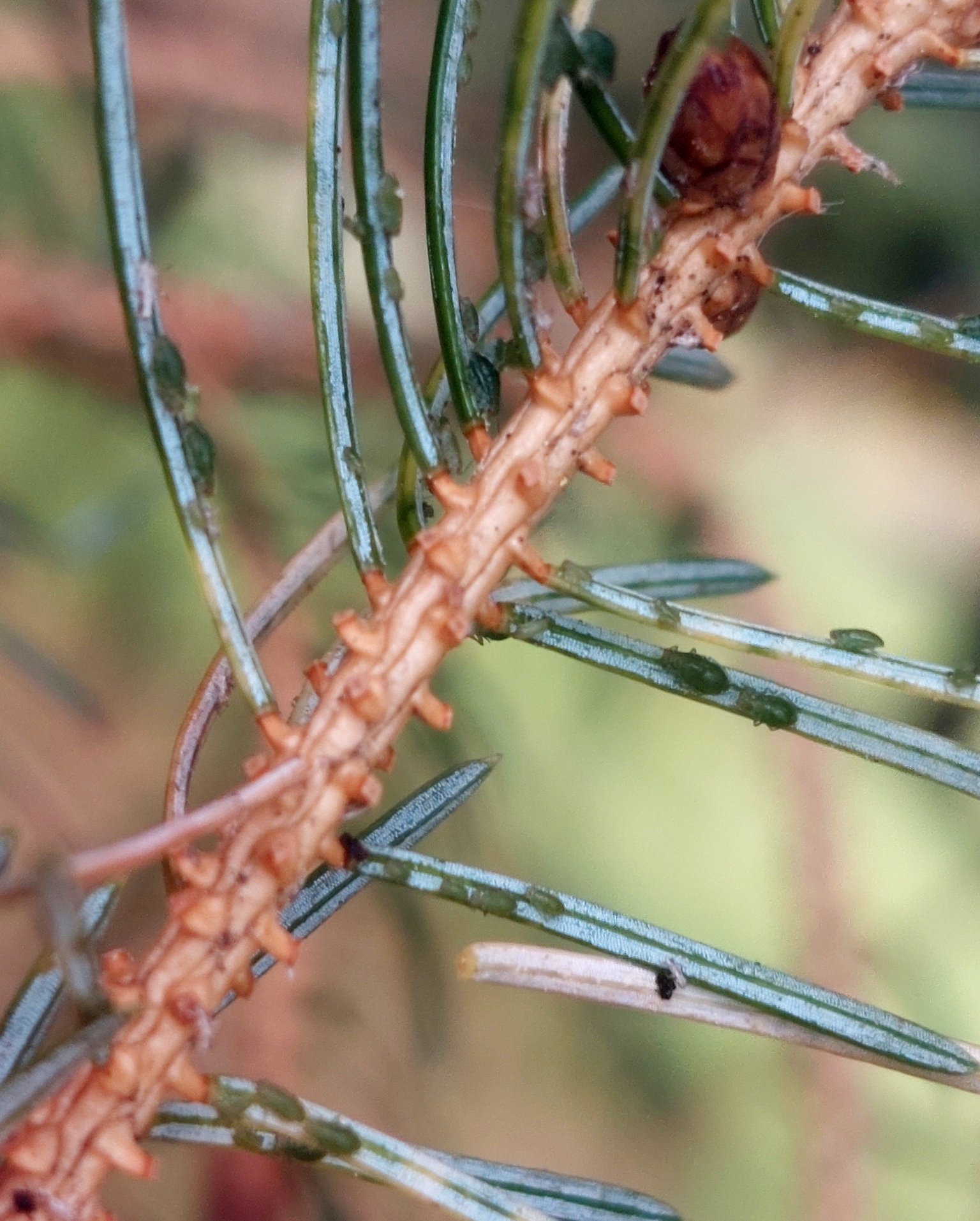
- Green spruce aphids on Sitka spruce foliage, Scotland

Scientific classification
- Kingdom: Animalia
- Phylum: Arthropoda
- Class: Insecta
- Order: Hemiptera
- Suborder: Sternorrhyncha
- Family: Aphididae
- Genus: Elatobium
- Species: E. abietinum

Binomial name
- Elatobium abietinum (Walker, 1849)

= Elatobium abietinum =

Species of true bug

Elatobium abietinum, commonly known as the green spruce aphid, or spruce aphid is a species of aphid in the subfamily Aphidinae that feeds on spruce (Picea spp.), and occasionally fir (Abies spp.). It is native to northern, central and eastern Europe and has spread to western Europe, North America and elsewhere.

== Description ==
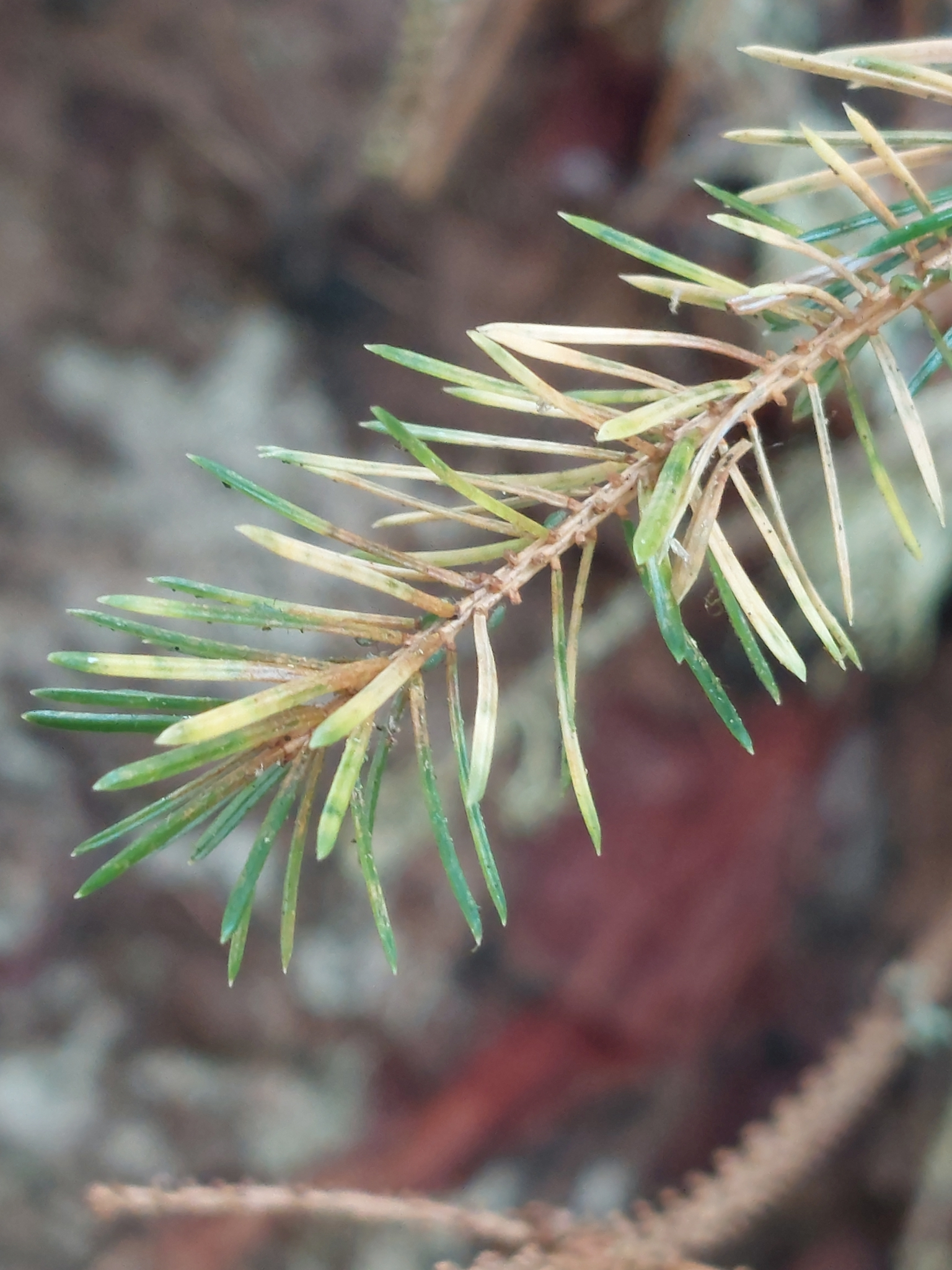
Sitka spruce foliage discoloured and partly defoliated by green spruce aphids; Scotland

Wingless adults are some shade of green, sometimes with a slight waxy covering, and grow to a length of about 2 mm (0.1 in). The siphunculi (slender tubes on the fifth abdominal segment) are cylindrical, pale and slightly S-shaped, and are much longer than the cauda (tail-like protrusion).

== Distribution and host range ==
Elatobium abietinum was first discovered by Francis Walker in 1846 at Southgate near London on cultivated spruces; it was subsequently found to be native to northern, central and eastern Europe where its original host is Picea abies. From this range it has spread to western Europe where plantations of P. abies have been established, and expanded its host range to include Picea sitchensis and other Picea species, and occasionally on fir (Abies species). It has been introduced into Iceland, New Zealand, Tasmania, Chile and other regions where P. abies is grown in plantations. In North America it has become established and further extended its host range from P. sitchensis on the Pacific coast to Picea engelmannii and Picea pungens inland. Altogether it has been recorded feeding on 14 species of Picea and on 5 species of Abies.

== Ecology ==
Elatobium abietinum has an unusual life cycle and feeds solely on coniferous trees. Wingless adult females often continue feeding and producing young parthenogenetically throughout the winter. In spring, winged aphids are produced and fly to other trees. Young nymphs enter diapause during the summer, recommencing development in the autumn. In Europe, males occur and there is a sexual phase, but in the other parts of the world, only females are known.

Invertebrate predators of this aphid in Wales include brown lacewings (Hemerobiidae), soldier beetles (Malthodes and Rhagonycha, Cantharidae), ladybirds (Coccinellidae) and hoverfly larvae (Syrphidae). Many small passerine birds feed on aphids, especially when they are feeding their young; they include goldcrests, warblers, sparrows, tits and chickadees, some finches, and woodpeckers.

== Damage ==
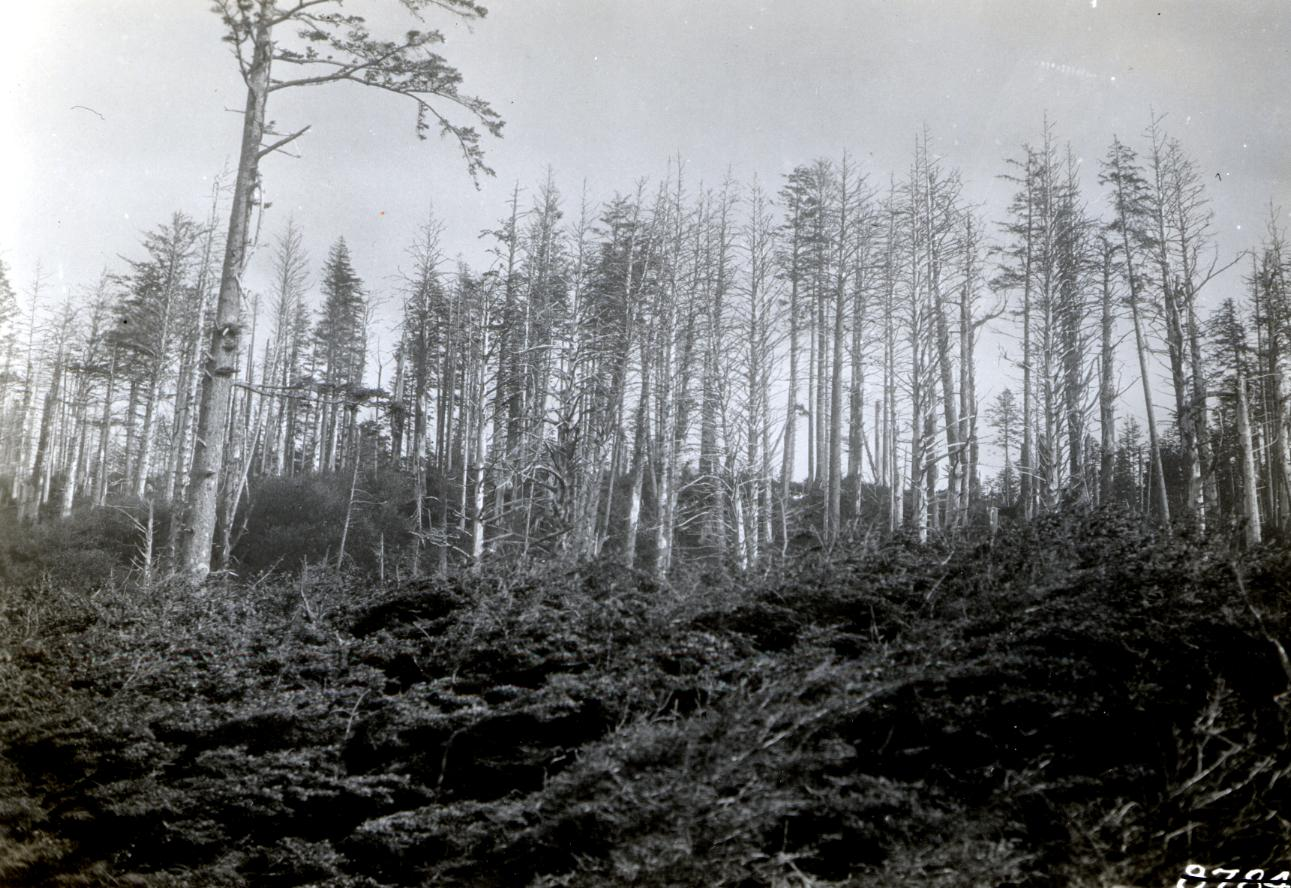
Elatobium abietinum-related damage to sitka spruce, Washington state, USA, 1932

Within its native range, Elatobium abietinum is scarce, as its population is kept in check by the low winter temperatures in the continental climate of the region, with significant mortality occurring when the air temperature drops below -8°C. It becomes much more damaging on spruces in oceanic climates with mild winters such as Great Britain, where it is able to breed more continuously through the winter.

The first record of damage was made at the discovery of the species, with the 1845-46 winter being unusually mild in Britain and leading to defoliation of spruces that was observed by Francis Walker; this led to his discovery of the insect as its cause:

"In 1846, a year remarkable for the mildness of the winter and of the spring, it had attained its full size before the end of January, and was very abundant near London beneath the leaves of the spruce-firs, some of which were stripped of their foliage in consequence of its attacks. It does not disappear before the latter part of November." — Francis Walker, cited in Day et al. 1998 (p.4).

Elatobium abietinum feeds by sucking sap from spruce needles, often causing defoliation of older needles and wilting of young growth. The presence of the aphids weakens the tree by decreasing growth rates and making it more susceptible to attack by other pests such as the spruce beetle (Dendroctonus rufipennis). Picea engalmannii and Picea pungens in Arizona and New Mexico show especially high mortality rates when infected by western spruce dwarf mistletoe (Arceuthobium microcarpum) and defoliated by E. abietinum. Serious defoliation can kill the tree.
