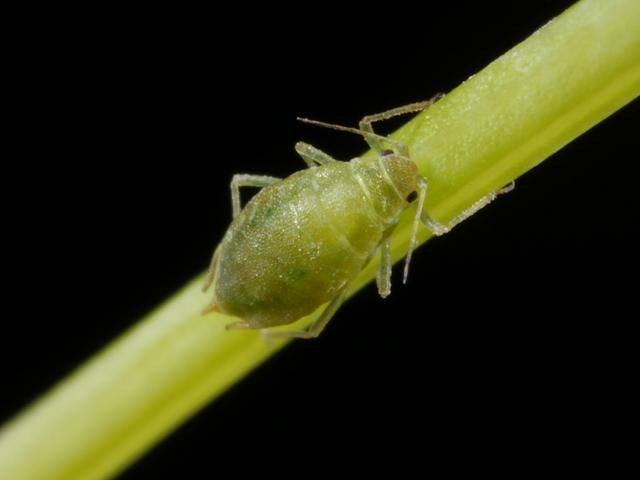

Scientific classification
- Kingdom: Animalia
- Phylum: Arthropoda
- Class: Insecta
- Order: Hemiptera
- Suborder: Sternorrhyncha
- Family: Aphididae
- Subfamily: Aphidinae
- Tribe: Macrosiphini
- Genus: Cavariella; Del Guercio, 1911

= Cavariella =

Genus of true bugs

Cavariella is a genus of true bugs in the family Aphididae. The genus has an almost cosmopolitan distribution.

== Species ==
The following species are recognised in the genus Cavariella:

- Cavariella aegopodii (Scopoli, 1763) - carrot-willow aphid
- Cavariella angelicae (Matsumura, 1918)
- Cavariella aquatica (Gillette & Bragg, 1916)
- Cavariella araliae Takahashi, 1921
- Cavariella archangelicae (Scopoli, 1763)
- Cavariella aspidaphoides Hille Ris Lambers, 1969
- Cavariella bhutanensis Chakrabarti & Das, 2009
- Cavariella biswasi Ghosh, Basu & Raychaudhuri, 1969
- Cavariella borealis Hille Ris Lambers, 1952
- Cavariella bunii
- Cavariella cessana Zhang, Chen, Zhong & Li, 1999
- Cavariella cicutae (Koch, 1854)
- Cavariella cicutisucta Qiao, 2005
- Cavariella digitata Hille Ris Lambers, 1969
- Cavariella gilgiana Zhang, Chen, Zhong & Li, 1999
- Cavariella gilibertiae Takahashi, 1961
- Cavariella hendersoni Knowlton & Smith, 1936
- Cavariella heraclei Takahashi, 1961
- Cavariella hidaensis Takahashi, 1961
- Cavariella himachali
- Cavariella indica
- Cavariella intermedia Hille Ris Lambers, 1969
- Cavariella japonica (Essig & Kuwana, 1918)
- Cavariella kamtshatica
- Cavariella konoi Takahashi, 1939
- Cavariella largispiracula Zhang, Chen, Zhong & Li, 1999
- Cavariella lhasana Zhang, 1981
- Cavariella longicauda
- Cavariella nigra Basu, 1964
- Cavariella nigrocaudata Takahashi, 1965
- Cavariella nipponica Takahashi, 1961
- Cavariella oenanthi (Shinji, 1922)
- Cavariella pastinacae (Linnaeus, 1758)
- Cavariella pseudopustula Hille Ris Lambers, 1969
- Cavariella pustula Essig, 1937
- Cavariella rutila
- Cavariella salicicola (Matsumura, 1917)
- Cavariella salicis (Monell, 1879)
- Cavariella sapporoensis Takahashi, 1961
- Cavariella saxifragae Remaudière, 1959
- Cavariella sericola
- Cavariella simlaensis
- Cavariella takahashii Hille Ris Lambers, 1965
- Cavariella theobaldi (Gillette & Bragg, 1918)
