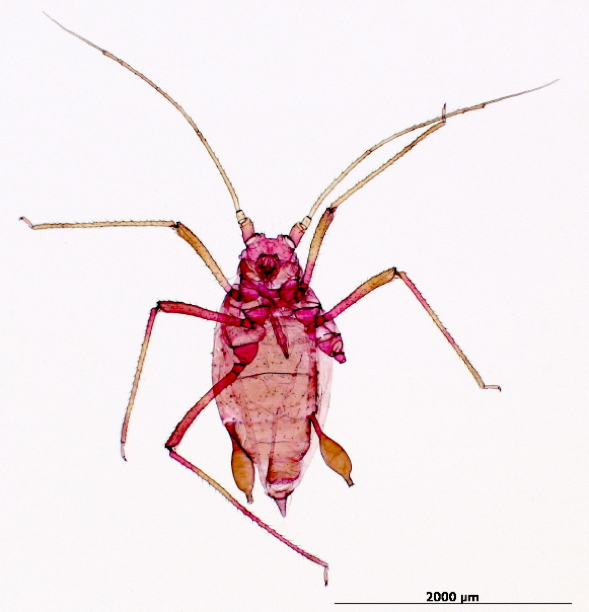
- Habitus of Rhopalosiphoninus latysiphon (wingless form)

Scientific classification
- Domain: Eukaryota
- Kingdom: Animalia
- Phylum: Arthropoda
- Class: Insecta
- Order: Hemiptera
- Suborder: Sternorrhyncha
- Family: Aphididae
- Genus: Rhopalosiphoninus
- Species: R. latysiphon

Binomial name
- Rhopalosiphoninus latysiphon (Davidson, 1912)

Synonyms
- Amphorophora latysiphon Davidson, 1912

= Rhopalosiphoninus latysiphon =

Species of true bug

Rhopalosiphoninus latysiphon, the bulb-and-potato aphid, is a species of aphid. It is a true bug that feeds on tulip and gladiolus bulbs, potatoes, and the roots of a variety of different plant species. However, it is noted that these subspecies are possible synonyms.

== Taxonomy ==
There are two described subspecies of Rhopalosiphoninus latysiphon:

- Rhopalosiphoninus latysiphon latysiphon
- Rhopalosiphoninus latysiphon panaxis

However, it is noted that these subspecies are possible synonyms.
