= Anuromyzus cotoneasteris =

Scientific classification
- Kingdom: Animalia
- Phylum: Arthropoda
- Clade: Pancrustacea
- Class: Insecta
- Order: Hemiptera
- Suborder: Sternorrhyncha
- Family: Aphididae
- Genus: Anuromyzus
- Species: A. cotoneasteris

Binomial name
- Anuromyzus cotoneasteris (Shaposhnikov, 1959)

Synonyms
- Dysaphis cotoneasteris Shaposhnikov, 1959

Species of aphid

Anuromyzus cotoneasteris is a species of aphid in the Macrosiphini tribe.
