= Idiopterus nephrelepidis =

Scientific classification
- Domain: Eukaryota
- Kingdom: Animalia
- Phylum: Arthropoda
- Class: Insecta
- Order: Hemiptera
- Suborder: Sternorrhyncha
- Family: Aphididae
- Genus: Idiopterus
- Species: I. nephrelepidis

Binomial name
- Idiopterus nephrelepidis Davis, 1909

Species of true bug

Idiopterus nephrelepidis, commonly known as the black fern aphid, is a species of aphid insect that feeds on various species of fern. It is the type species of the genus Idiopterus.

Likely to have originated in the neotropics, it has spread across Europe, though it is only found indoors in Central and Northern Europe, New Zealand, and North America.
