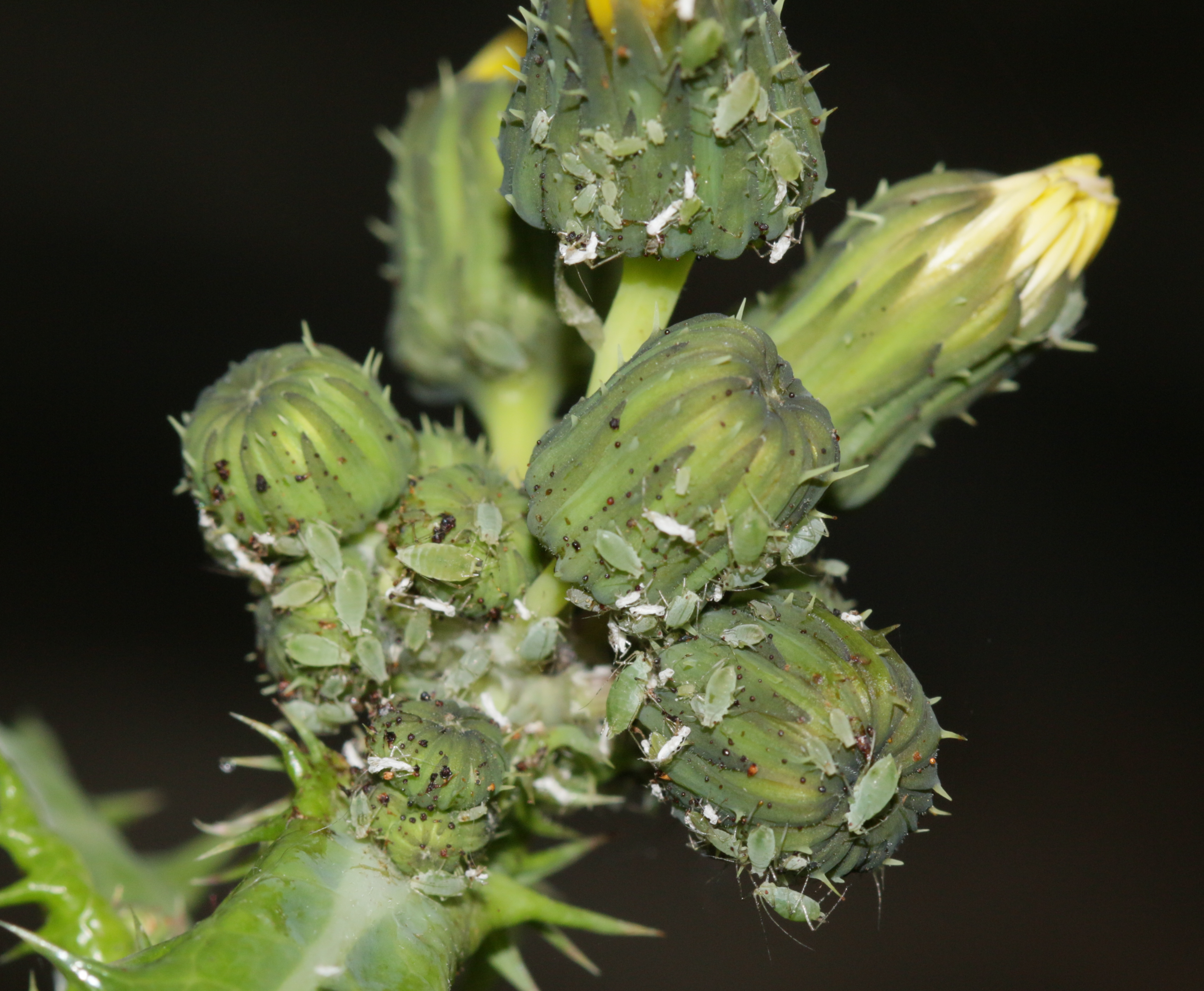

Scientific classification
- Kingdom: Animalia
- Phylum: Arthropoda
- Class: Insecta
- Order: Hemiptera
- Suborder: Sternorrhyncha
- Family: Aphididae
- Genus: Hyperomyzus
- Species: H. lactucae

Binomial name
- Hyperomyzus lactucae (Linnaeus, 1758)

= Hyperomyzus lactucae =

Species of true bug

Hyperomyzus lactucae, known generally as the blackcurrant-sowthistle aphid or sow thistle aphid, is a species of aphid in the family Aphididae. It is found in Europe.

== Subspecies ==
These two subspecies belong to the species Hyperomyzus lactucae:

- Hyperomyzus lactucae asiatica Narzikulov & Umarov, 1969
- Hyperomyzus lactucae lactucae (Linnaeus, 1758)
