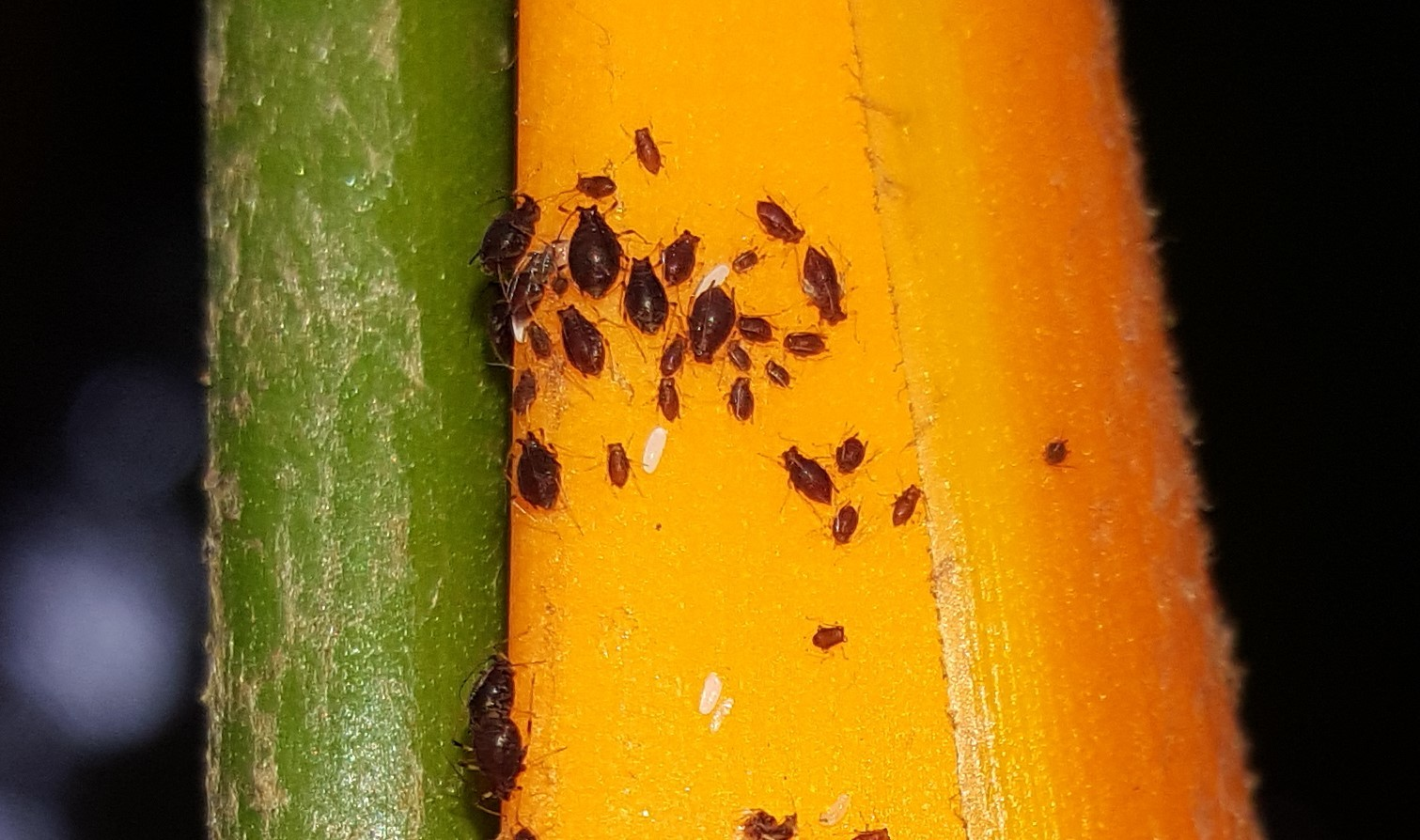
- Pentalonia nigronervosa

Scientific classification
- Domain: Eukaryota
- Kingdom: Animalia
- Phylum: Arthropoda
- Class: Insecta
- Order: Hemiptera
- Suborder: Sternorrhyncha
- Family: Aphididae
- Subfamily: Aphidinae
- Tribe: Macrosiphini
- Genus: Pentalonia; Coquerel, 1859

= Pentalonia =

Genus of insects

Pentalonia is a genus of true bugs belonging to the family Aphididae.

The species of this genus are found in Central America, Southwestern Asia and Australia.

Species:

- Pentalonia caladii Goot, 1917
- Pentalonia gavarri Eastop, 1967
- Pentalonia kalimpongensis (Basu, 1968)
- Pentalonia nigronervosa Coquerel, 1859
