= Hyadaphis coriandri =

Scientific classification
- Domain: Eukaryota
- Kingdom: Animalia
- Phylum: Arthropoda
- Class: Insecta
- Order: Hemiptera
- Suborder: Sternorrhyncha
- Family: Aphididae
- Genus: Hyadaphis
- Species: H. coriandri

Binomial name
- Hyadaphis coriandri (Das, B.C., 1918)

Species of true bug

Hyadaphis coriandri, the coriander aphid, is a species of aphid in the family Aphididae.
