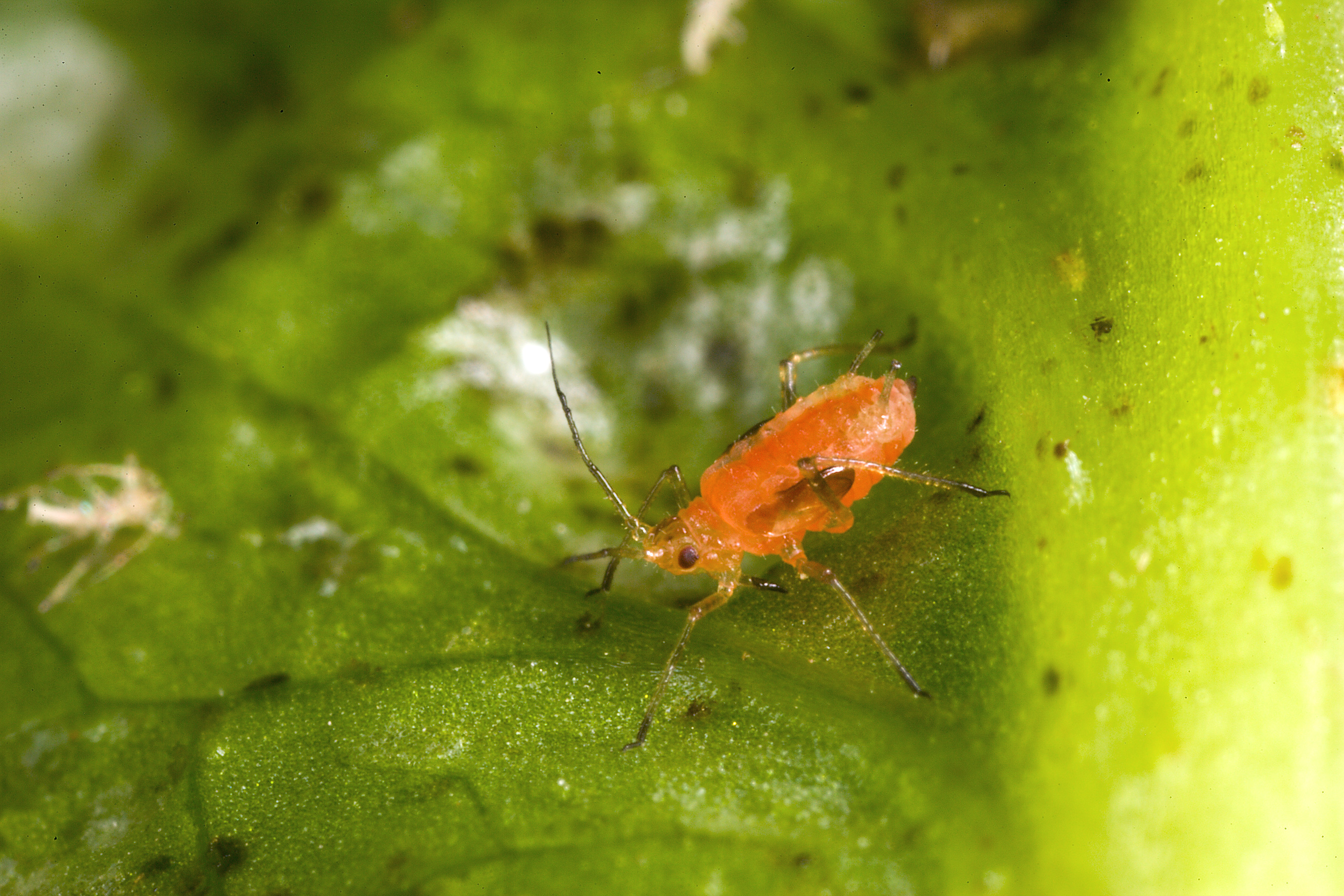
- Nasonovia ribisnigri

Scientific classification
- Domain: Eukaryota
- Kingdom: Animalia
- Phylum: Arthropoda
- Class: Insecta
- Order: Hemiptera
- Suborder: Sternorrhyncha
- Family: Aphididae
- Subfamily: Aphidinae
- Tribe: Macrosiphini
- Genus: Nasonovia; Mordvilko, 1914

Synonyms
- Kakimia Hottes & Frison, 1931

= Nasonovia =

Genus of true bugs

Nasonovia is a genus of true bugs belonging to the family Aphididae.

== Species ==
Species of the genus Nasonovia are found in Europe, Australia and North America. The following species are recognised:

- Nasonovia acyrthosiphon (Richards, 1963)
- Nasonovia alatavica Kadyrbekov, 1995
- Nasonovia alpina (Gillette & Palmer, 1928)
- Nasonovia altaensis Stenseth, 1969
- Nasonovia aquilegiae (Essig, 1917)
- Nasonovia arizonensis Heie, 1987
- Nasonovia borealis Heie, 1979
- Nasonovia brachycyclica Holman, 1972
- Nasonovia brevipes (Börner, 1950)
- Nasonovia carolinensis Heie, 1979
- Nasonovia castelleiae (Sampson, 1939)
- Nasonovia collomiae (Palmer, 1936)
- Nasonovia compositellae (Hille Ris Lambers, 1931)
- Nasonovia compositellae (Theobald, 1924)
- Nasonovia crenicorna (Smith & Knowlton, 1939)
- Nasonovia cynosbati (Oestlund, 1887)
- Nasonovia dasyphylli Stroyan, 1957
- Nasonovia davidsoni Heie, 1979
- Nasonovia dzhetisuensis Kadyrbekov, 1995
- Nasonovia grossa Heie, 1979
- Nasonovia heiei Kadyrbekov, 1995
- Nasonovia heucherae (Thomas, 1879)
- Nasonovia hottesi Heie, 1979
- Nasonovia houghtonensis (Troop, 1906)
- Nasonovia jammuensis Verma, 1970
- Nasonovia muesebecki (Knowlton & Allen, 1939)
- Nasonovia nivalis (Börner, 1950)
- Nasonovia pilosellae (Börner, 1933)
- Nasonovia polemonii (Gillette & Palmer, 1929)
- Nasonovia purpurascens (Oestlund, 1887)
- Nasonovia ranunculi Heie, 1979
- Nasonovia ribifolii (Davidson, 1917)
- Nasonovia ribisnigri (Mosley, 1841)
- Nasonovia rostrata David & Hameed, 1974
- Nasonovia salebrosa (Ivanovskaya, 1971)
- Nasonovia sampsoni Heie, 1979
- Nasonovia saurotarbagataica Kadyrbekov, 2005
- Nasonovia saxifragae (Doncaster & Stroyan, 1952)
- Nasonovia smithi Heie, 1979
- Nasonovia stroyani Heie, 1980
- Nasonovia suguri
- Nasonovia takala (Hottes, 1933)
- Nasonovia tiarellae Heie, 1979
- Nasonovia vannesii Stenseth, 1968
- Nasonovia vockerothi (Richards, 1963)
- Nasonovia wahinkae (Hottes, 1933)
- Nasonovia werderi Lampel, 1988
- Nasonovia williamsi (Smith & Parron, 1978)
