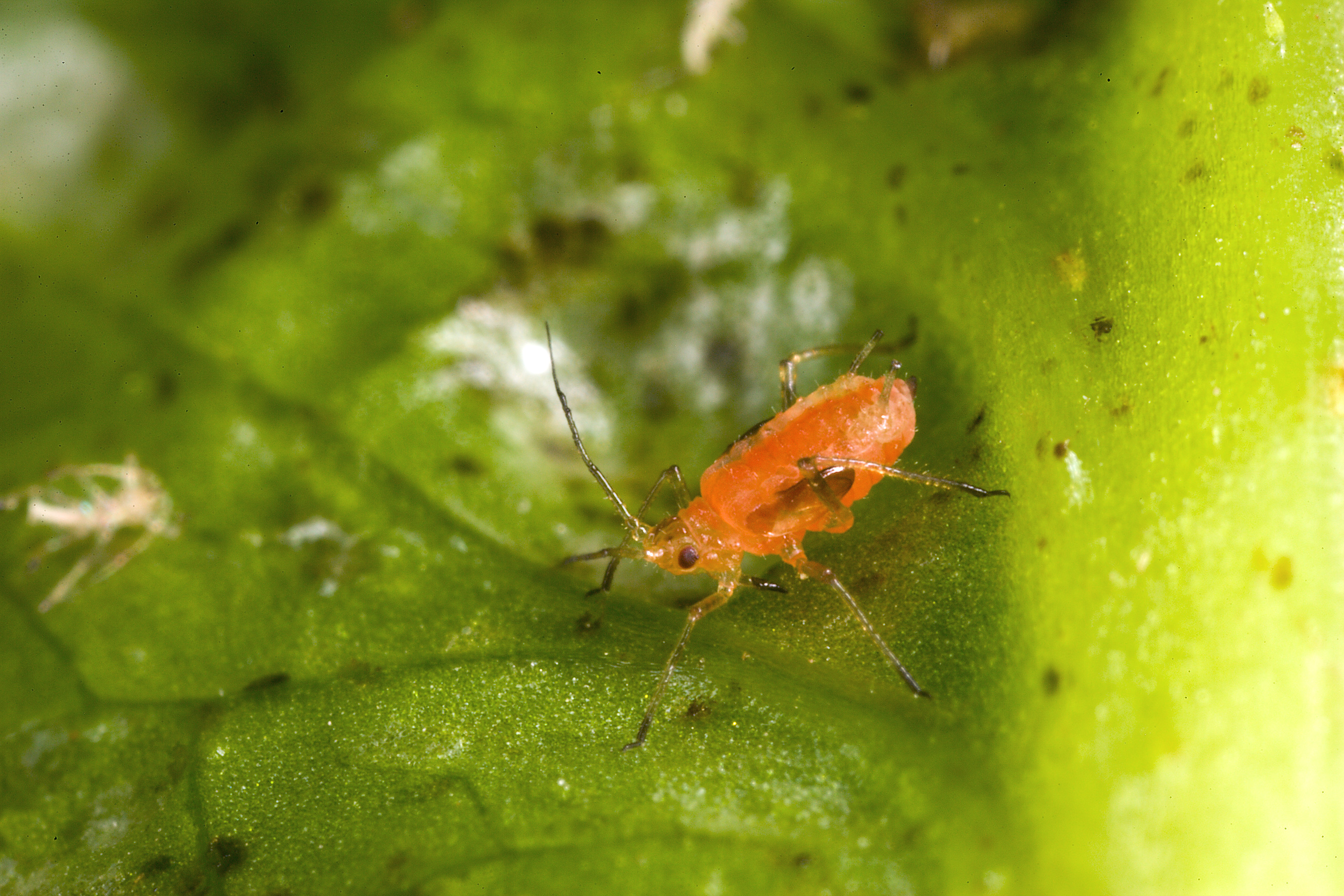

Scientific classification
- Domain: Eukaryota
- Kingdom: Animalia
- Phylum: Arthropoda
- Class: Insecta
- Order: Hemiptera
- Suborder: Sternorrhyncha
- Family: Aphididae
- Genus: Nasonovia
- Species: N. ribisnigri

Binomial name
- Nasonovia ribisnigri (Mosley, 1841)

Synonyms
- Aphis ribisnigri Mosley, 1841; Aphis ribicola Kaltenbach, 1843

= Nasonovia ribisnigri =

Species of true bug

Nasonovia ribisnigri is a species of aphid. Their primary hosts are currant plants, including blackcurrants (Ribes nigrum) and gooseberries (Ribes uva-crispa), while the secondary hosts are a wider range of plants, including members of the Compositae (Hieracium, Lapsana, Crepis, Leontodon, Lactuca and Cichorium), Lamiales (Veronica and Euphrasia) and Solanaceae (Nicotiana and Petunia). They are an important agricultural pest in lettuce and endive cultivation.

Males grow to a length of 2.5 millimetres (0.098 in), while viviparous females are 1.7–3.2 mm (0.067–0.126 in) long, but oviparous female only reach 1.6–1.7 mm (0.063–0.067 in).
