= Anuromyzus =

Scientific classification
- Kingdom: Animalia
- Phylum: Arthropoda
- Clade: Pancrustacea
- Class: Insecta
- Order: Hemiptera
- Suborder: Sternorrhyncha
- Family: Aphididae
- Subfamily: Aphidinae
- Tribe: Macrosiphini
- Genus: Anuromyzus; Shaposhnikov, 1959

Type species
- Dysaphis cotoneasteris Shaposhnikov, 1959

Genus of aphid

Anuromyzus is a genus of aphids in the tribe Macrosiphini.

There are two species assigned to this genus:

- Anuromyzus cotoneasteris (Shaposhnikov, 1959)
- Anuromyzus acantholimonis Kök, Barjadze & Stekolshchikov, 2026
