= Cavariella konoi =

Scientific classification
- Kingdom: Animalia
- Phylum: Arthropoda
- Clade: Pancrustacea
- Class: Insecta
- Order: Hemiptera
- Suborder: Sternorrhyncha
- Family: Aphididae
- Genus: Cavariella
- Species: C. konoi

Binomial name
- Cavariella konoi Takahashi, 1939

Species of true bug

Cavariella konoi is a species of aphid in the family Aphididae. It is a small, soft-bodied insect growing to about 2.5 mm (0.1 in) long. The body is oval, pale yellowish green, sometimes with a pair of darker green, longitudinal bands. Wingless females are found on the leaves of willow Salix spp. during the summer where they reproduce parthenogenetically and form large populations. It also feeds on the perennial plant great angelica (Angelica atropurpurea).

This species has a holarctic distribution.
