= Aulacorthum solani =

Scientific classification
- Kingdom: Animalia
- Phylum: Arthropoda
- Clade: Pancrustacea
- Class: Insecta
- Order: Hemiptera
- Suborder: Sternorrhyncha
- Family: Aphididae
- Genus: Aulacorthum
- Species: A. solani

Binomial name
- Aulacorthum solani (Kaltenbach, 1843)

Subspecies
- Acyrthosiphon solani solani Kaltenbach; Acyrthosiphon solani orientale Hille Ris Lambers, 1949; r

Synonyms
- Acyrthosiphon solani

Species of true bug

Aulacorthum solani, the foxglove aphid or glasshouse-potato aphid, is an aphid in the superfamily Aphidoidea in the order Hemiptera. It is a true bug and sucks sap from plants.

== Host ==
It has one of the broadest host ranges of any aphid in the world, where they both hosts on dicots and monocots.

== Economic importance ==
It is known to be a major insect pest on tomato, peppers, tobacco, celery, carrots, tulip bulbs, cucurbits and legumes.

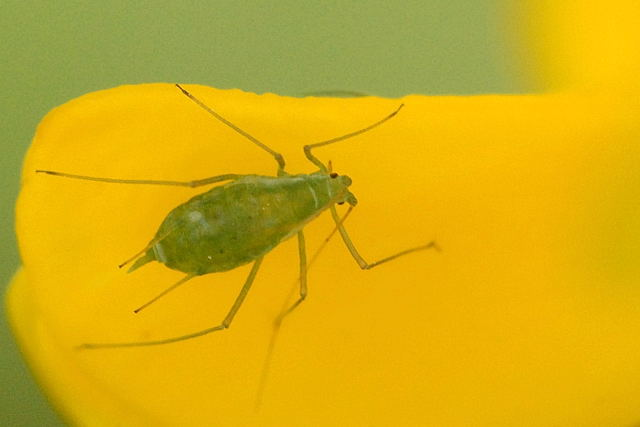
