= Idiopterus =

Scientific classification
- Domain: Eukaryota
- Kingdom: Animalia
- Phylum: Arthropoda
- Class: Insecta
- Order: Hemiptera
- Suborder: Sternorrhyncha
- Family: Aphididae
- Subfamily: Aphidinae
- Tribe: Macrosiphini
- Genus: Idiopterus; Davis, 1909

Species
- See text

Genus of true bugs

Idiopterus is a genus of aphid insect. The type species is Idiopterus nephrelepidis.
