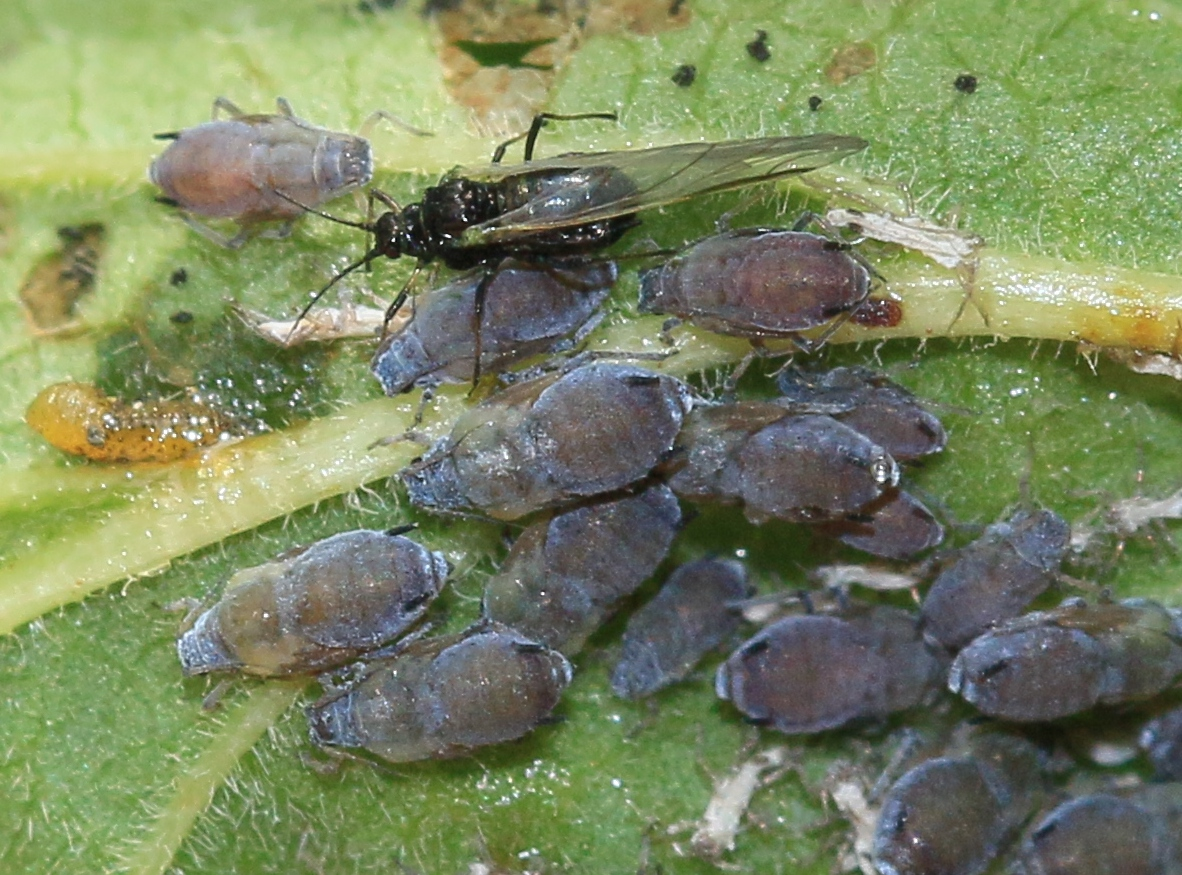

Scientific classification
- Domain: Eukaryota
- Kingdom: Animalia
- Phylum: Arthropoda
- Class: Insecta
- Order: Hemiptera
- Suborder: Sternorrhyncha
- Family: Aphididae
- Tribe: Macrosiphini
- Genus: Ceruraphis; Börner, 1926

Synonyms
- Ceruaphis; Neoceruraphis Shaposhnikov, 1956

= Ceruraphis =

Genus of true bugs

Ceruraphis is a genus of true bugs belonging to the family Aphididae.

The genus was first described by Börner in 1926.

The species of this genus are found in Europe and Northern America.

Species include:

- Ceruraphis eriophori (Walker, 1848)
