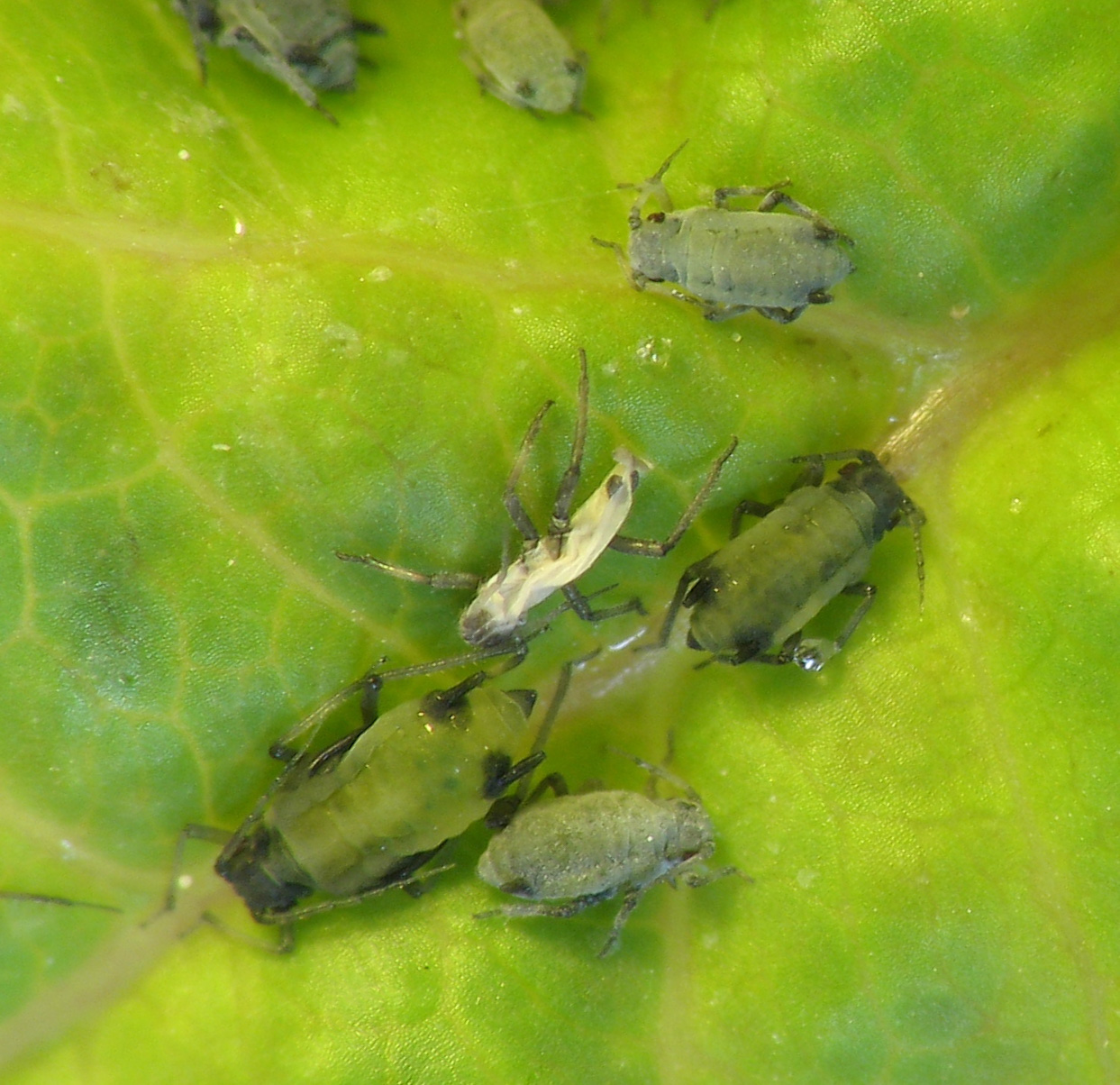
- Hyadaphis sp. on trumpet honeysuckle

Scientific classification
- Kingdom: Animalia
- Phylum: Arthropoda
- Clade: Pancrustacea
- Class: Insecta
- Order: Hemiptera
- Suborder: Sternorrhyncha
- Family: Aphididae
- Subfamily: Aphidinae
- Tribe: Macrosiphini
- Genus: Hyadaphis; Kirkaldy, 1904

= Hyadaphis =

Genus of true bugs

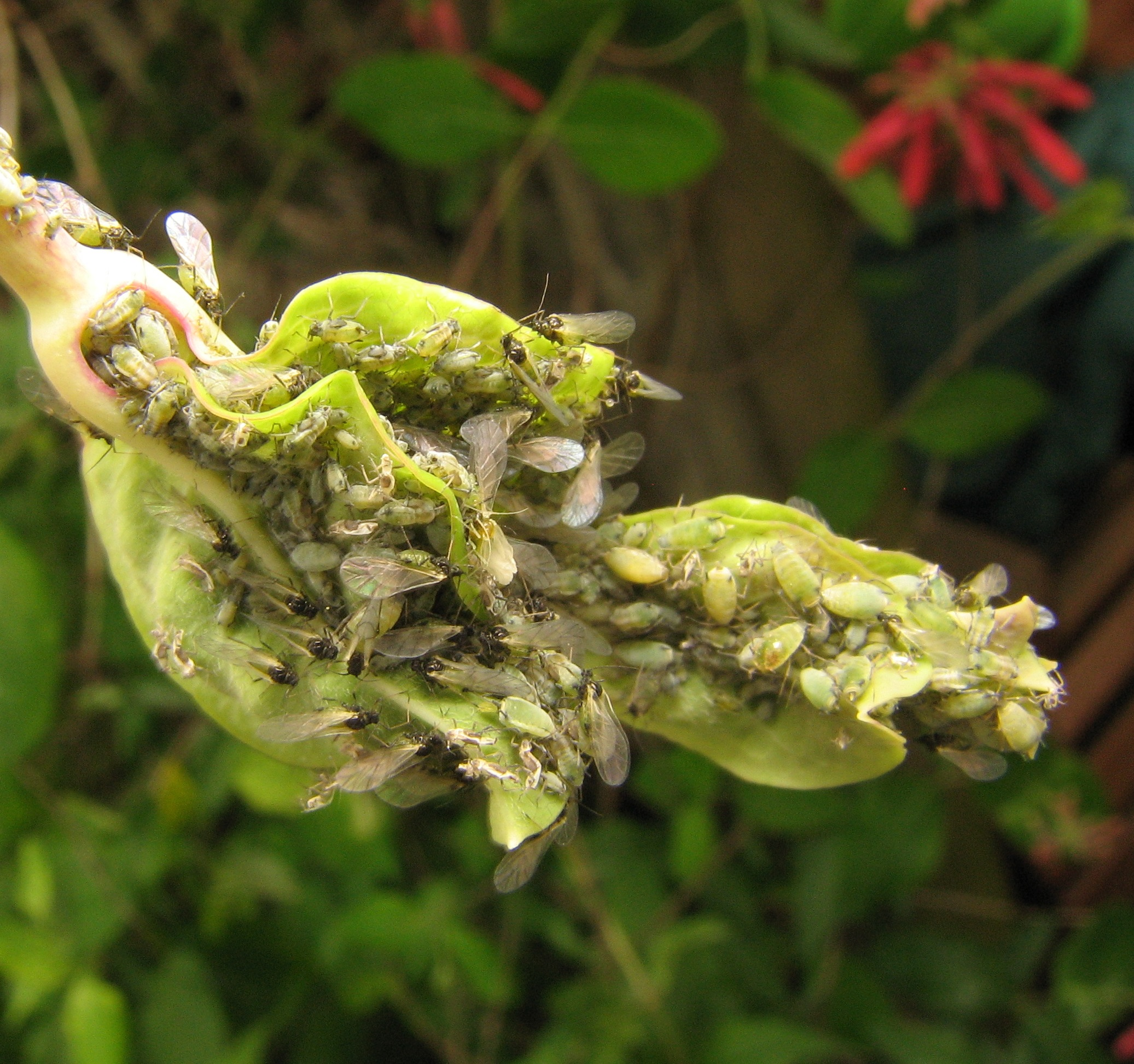
Damage caused on trumpet honeysuckle by Hyadaphis

Hyadaphis is a genus of aphids in the family Aphididae. There are about 19 described species in Hyadaphis.

== Species ==
These 19 species belong to the genus Hyadaphis:

- Hyadaphis agabiformis (Nevsky, 1928)
- Hyadaphis albus (Monzen, 1929)
- Hyadaphis anethi Nieto Nafría, Pérez Hidalgo & P.A.Brown, 2016
- Hyadaphis bicincta Börner, 1942
- Hyadaphis bupleuri Börner, 1939
- Hyadaphis bupleuriphila Barjadze & Özdemir, 2018
- Hyadaphis coerulescens
- Hyadaphis coriandri (Das, B.C., 1918) (coriander aphid)
- Hyadaphis ferganica
- Hyadaphis foeniculi (Passerini, 1860) (fennel aphid)
- Hyadaphis galaganiae
- Hyadaphis haplophylli Kadyrbekov, 2005
- Hyadaphis levantina Nieto Nafría, Pérez Hidalgo & P.A.Brown, 2016
- Hyadaphis mongolica Szelegiewicz, 1969
- Hyadaphis parva Nieto Nafría, Pérez Hidalgo & P.A.Brown, 2016
- Hyadaphis passerinii (Del Guercio, 1911)
- Hyadaphis polonica Szelegiewicz, 1959
- Hyadaphis tataricae (Aizenberg) (honeysuckle aphid)
- Hyadaphis veratri Shinji, 1942
