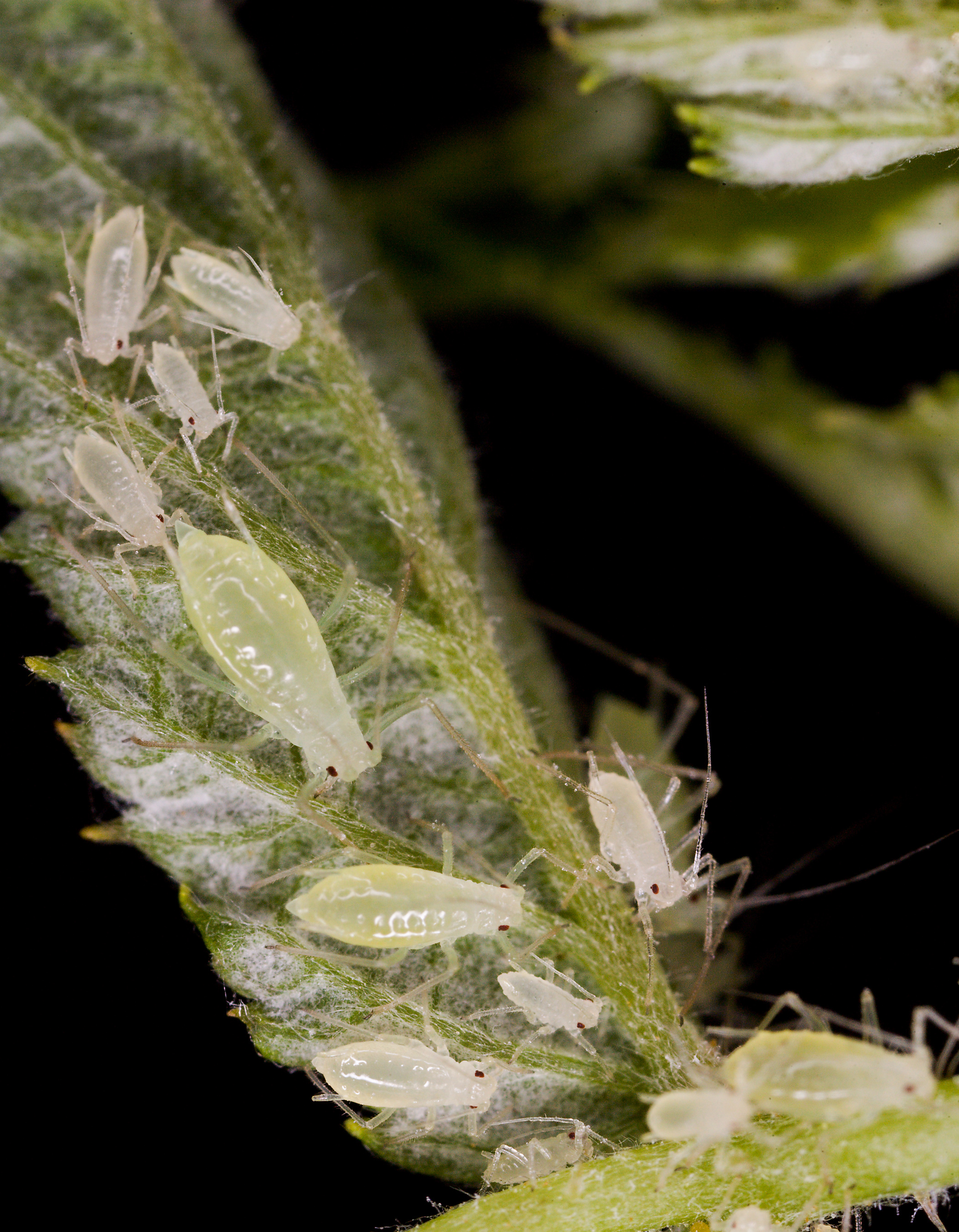
- Amphorophora

Scientific classification
- Domain: Eukaryota
- Kingdom: Animalia
- Phylum: Arthropoda
- Class: Insecta
- Order: Hemiptera
- Suborder: Sternorrhyncha
- Family: Aphididae
- Tribe: Macrosiphini
- Genus: Amphorophora; Buckton, 1976

= Amphorophora =

Genus of true bugs

Amphorophora is a genus of aphids belonging to the family Aphididae.

The genus was first described by George Bowdler Buckton in 1876.

There are 27 species, mostly nearctic. They are found in Eurasia and North America.

Some species:

- Amphorophora ampullata Dark-tipped fern aphid
- Amphorophora bartholomewi
- Amphorophora gei
- Amphorophora rubi (Kaltenbach, 1843)
