= Hayhurstia =

Scientific classification
- Domain: Eukaryota
- Kingdom: Animalia
- Phylum: Arthropoda
- Class: Insecta
- Order: Hemiptera
- Suborder: Sternorrhyncha
- Family: Aphididae
- Tribe: Macrosiphini
- Genus: Hayhurstia; Del Guercio, 1917
- Species: H. atriplicis

Binomial name
- Hayhurstia atriplicis (Linnaeus, 1761)

Genus of true bugs

Hayhurstia is a genus of aphids in the family Aphididae. There is one described species in Hayhurstia, H. atriplicis.
