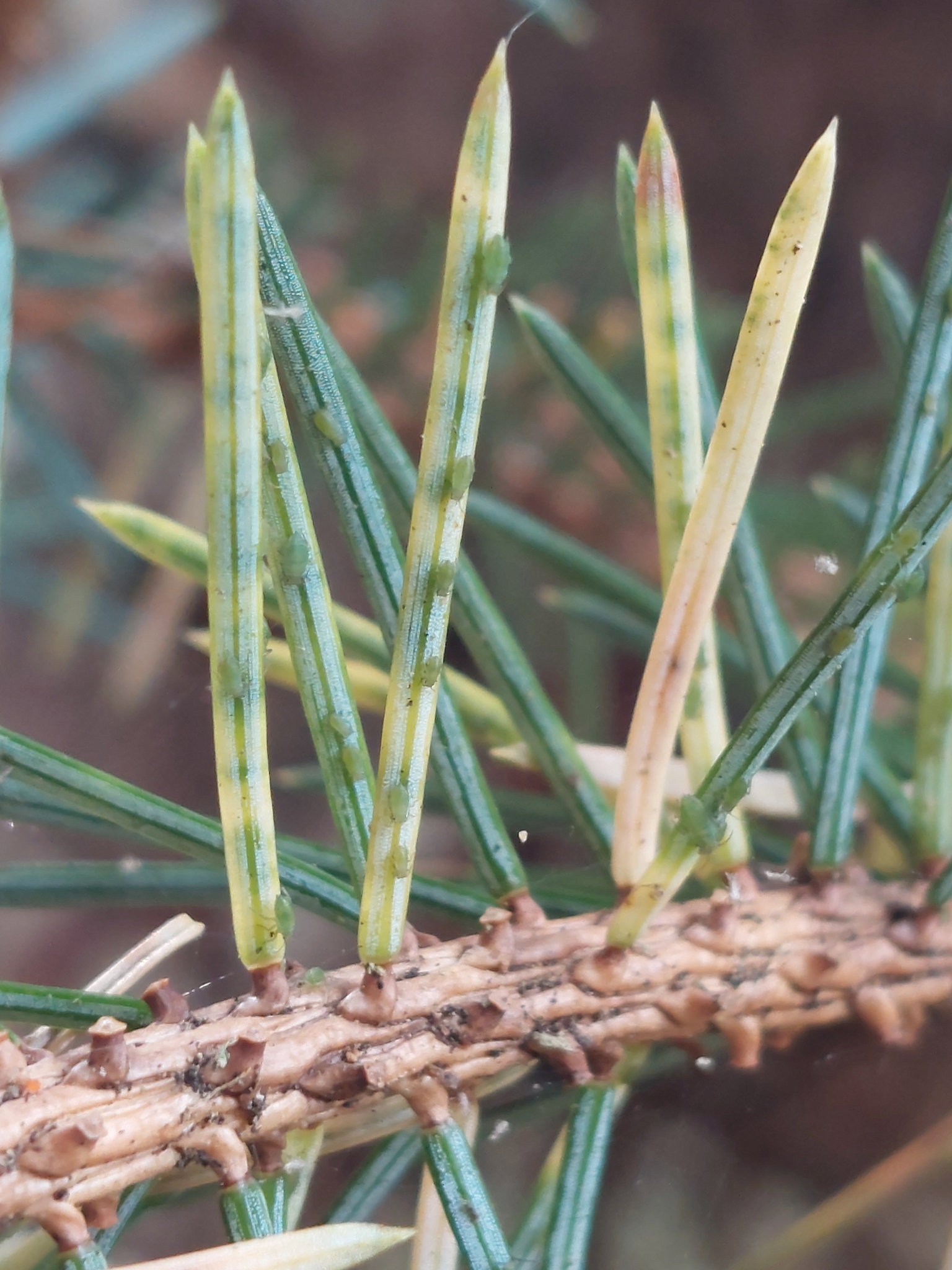
- Elatobium abietinum, Scotland

Scientific classification
- Kingdom: Animalia
- Phylum: Arthropoda
- Class: Insecta
- Order: Hemiptera
- Suborder: Sternorrhyncha
- Family: Aphididae
- Subfamily: Aphidinae
- Genus: Elatobium; Mordvilko, 1914

= Elatobium =

Genus of true bugs

Elatobium is a genus of insects in the family Aphididae containing five species of aphids that feed on the foliage of trees.

== Species ==
The genus includes five species:

- Elatobium abietinum which feeds on Picea in Europe and elsewhere
- Elatobium hidaense which feeds on Salix in Japan and Kamschatica
- Elatobium laricis which feeds on Larix sibirica in east Siberia
- Elatobium momii which feeds on Abies firma, Picea jezoensis and Taxus cuspidata in Japan
- Elatobium trochodendri which feeds on Trochodendron aralioides in Japan
