= Metopolophium =

Scientific classification
- Domain: Eukaryota
- Kingdom: Animalia
- Phylum: Arthropoda
- Class: Insecta
- Order: Hemiptera
- Suborder: Sternorrhyncha
- Family: Aphididae
- Tribe: Macrosiphini
- Genus: Metopolophium; Mordvilko, 1914

Genus of true bugs

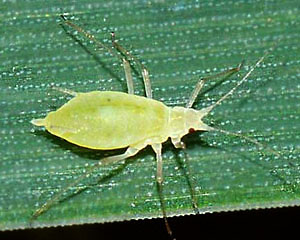
Metopolophium dirhodum

Metopolophium is a genus of true bugs belonging to the family Aphididae.

The species of this genus are found in Eurasia, Australia and Northern America.

Species:

- Metopolophium albidum Hille Ris Lambers, 1947
- Metopolophium arctogenicolens Richards, 1964
