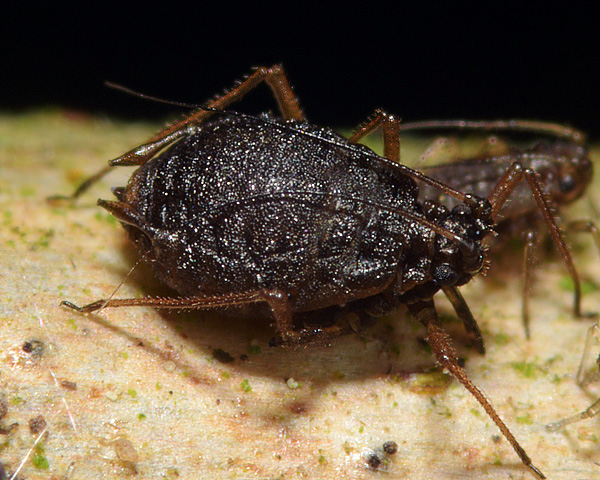
- Rhopalosiphoninus ribesinus

Scientific classification
- Domain: Eukaryota
- Kingdom: Animalia
- Phylum: Arthropoda
- Class: Insecta
- Order: Hemiptera
- Suborder: Sternorrhyncha
- Family: Aphididae
- Genus: Rhopalosiphoninus; Baker, 1920

= Rhopalosiphoninus =

Genus of true bugs

Rhopalosiphoninus is a genus of true bugs belonging to the family Aphididae.

The species of this genus are found in Europe, Australia, and North America.

Species:

- Neorhopalosiphoninus Ghosh & Raychaudhuri, 1968
  - Rhopalosiphoninus smilacifoliae (Ghosh & Raychaudhuri, 1968)
  - Rhopalosiphoninus solani (Thomas, 1879)
  - Rhopalosiphoninus staphyleae (Koch, 1854)
- Pseudorhopalosiphoninus Heinze, 1961
  - Rhopalosiphoninus calthae (Koch, 1854)
- Rhopalosiphoninus Baker, 1920
  - Rhopalosiphoninus celtifoliae Shinji, 1924
  - Rhopalosiphoninus cephalospinulosus Tao, 1989
  - Rhopalosiphoninus deutzifoliae Shinji, 1924
  - Rhopalosiphoninus ehretis Bhattacharya & Chakrabarti, 1982
  - Rhopalosiphoninus elsholtze Chakrabarti & Medda, 1989
  - Rhopalosiphoninus hydrangeae (Matsumura, 1918)
  - Rhopalosiphoninus ichigo (Shinji, 1922)
  - Rhopalosiphoninus indicus
  - Rhopalosiphoninus kelleri Smith & Knowlton, 1977
  - Rhopalosiphoninus latysiphon (Davidson, 1912)
  - Rhopalosiphoninus longisetosus Chakrabarti & Ghosh, 1974
  - Rhopalosiphoninus maianthemi Stroyan, 1965
  - Rhopalosiphoninus multirhinarious Tao, 1989
  - Rhopalosiphoninus ribesinus (van der Goot, 1912)
  - Rhopalosiphoninus tiliae (Matsumura, 1918)
- Submegoura Hille Ris Lambers, 1953
  - Rhopalosiphoninus heikinheimoi (Börner, 1952)
