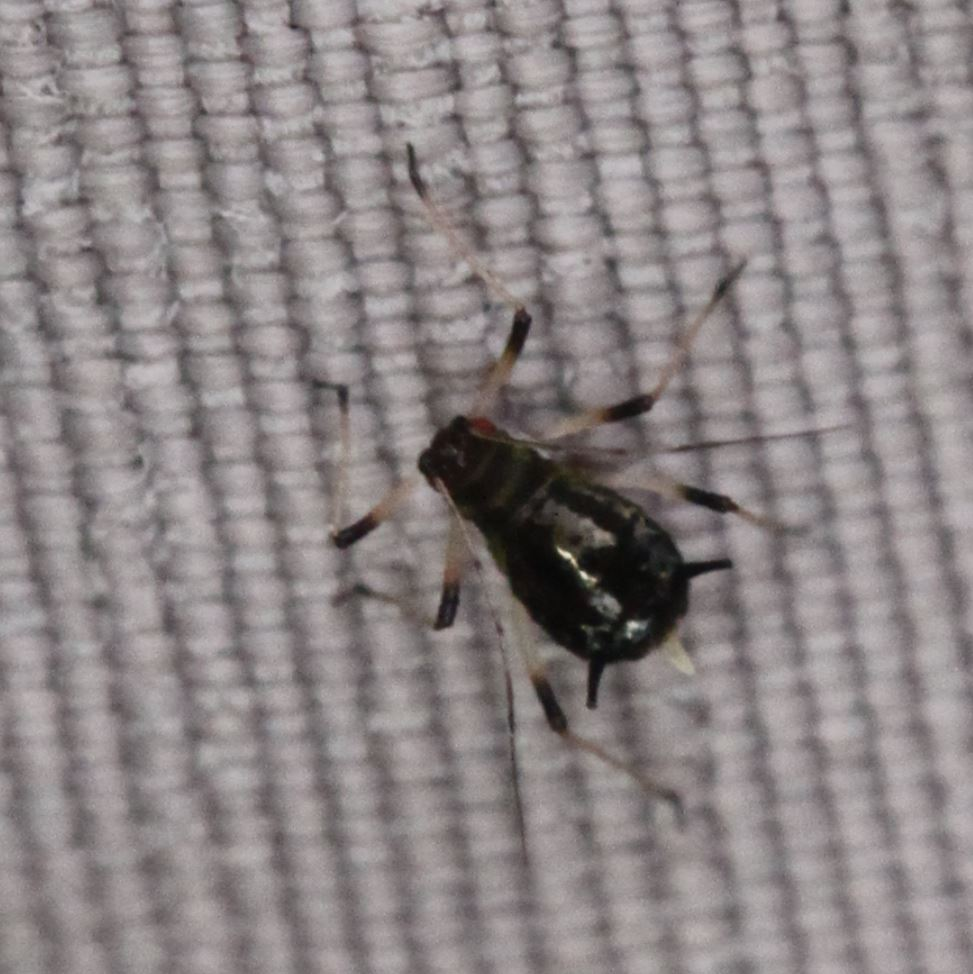
- Impatientinum Asiaticum

Scientific classification
- Domain: Eukaryota
- Kingdom: Animalia
- Phylum: Arthropoda
- Class: Insecta
- Order: Hemiptera
- Suborder: Sternorrhyncha
- Family: Aphididae
- Genus: Impatientinum; Mordvilko, 1914

= Impatientinum =

Genus of true bugs

Impatientinum is a genus of true bugs belonging to the family Aphididae.

The species of this genus are found in Europe.

Species:

- Impatientinum americanum Remaudière, 1981
- Impatientinum asiaticum Nevsky, 1929
