= Wahlgreniella =

Scientific classification
- Kingdom: Animalia
- Phylum: Arthropoda
- Class: Insecta
- Order: Hemiptera
- Suborder: Sternorrhyncha
- Family: Aphididae
- Genus: Wahlgreniella; Hille Ris Lambers, 1949

Genus of true bugs

Wahlgreniella is a genus of true bugs belonging to the family Aphididae.

The species of this genus are found in Europe and Western North America.

Species:

- Wahlgreniella arbuti (Davidson, 1910)
- Wahlgreniella empetri Richards, 1963
- Wahlgreniella lampeli Rupais, 1985
- Wahlgreniella nervata (Gillette, 1908)
- Wahlgreniella ossiannilssoni Hille Ris Lambers, 1949
- Wahlgreniella vaccinii (F.V.Theobald, 1924)
- Wahlgreniella viburni (R.Takahashi, 1925)
