= Longicaudus =

Scientific classification
- Kingdom: Animalia
- Phylum: Arthropoda
- Class: Insecta
- Order: Hemiptera
- Suborder: Sternorrhyncha
- Family: Aphididae
- Genus: Longicaudus; Goot, 1913

Genus of true bugs

Longicaudus is a genus of true bugs belonging to the family Aphididae.

The species of this genus are found in Europe and Northern America.

Species:

- Longicaudus cornutus Chakrabarti, Samiran & Banerjee, 1991
- Longicaudus dunlopi Hille Ris Lambers, 1965
