= Phorodon =

Scientific classification
- Domain: Eukaryota
- Kingdom: Animalia
- Phylum: Arthropoda
- Class: Insecta
- Order: Hemiptera
- Suborder: Sternorrhyncha
- Family: Aphididae
- Genus: Phorodon; Passerini, 1860

Genus of true bugs

Phorodon is a genus of true bugs belonging to the family Aphididae.

The species of this genus are found in Europe and Northern America.

Species:

- Phorodon cannabis Passerini, 1860
- Phorodon humuli (Schrank, 1801)
