= Plocamaphis =

Scientific classification
- Kingdom: Animalia
- Phylum: Arthropoda
- Class: Insecta
- Order: Hemiptera
- Suborder: Sternorrhyncha
- Family: Aphididae
- Genus: Plocamaphis; Oestlund, 1923

Genus of true bugs

Plocamaphis is a genus of true bugs belonging to the family Aphididae.

The species of this genus are found in Europe and Northern America.

Species:

- Plocamaphis amerinae (Hartig, 1841)
- Plocamaphis assetacea Zhang & Guangxue, 1981
