= Semiaphis =

Scientific classification
- Domain: Eukaryota
- Kingdom: Animalia
- Phylum: Arthropoda
- Class: Insecta
- Order: Hemiptera
- Suborder: Sternorrhyncha
- Family: Aphididae
- Genus: Semiaphis; Goot, 1913

Genus of true bugs

Semiaphis is a genus of true bugs belonging to the family Aphididae.

The species of this genus are found in Europe.

Species:

- Semiaphis aizenbergi (Narzikulov, 1957)
- Semiaphis anthrisci (Kaltenbach, 1843)
