= Rhopalomyzus =

Scientific classification
- Kingdom: Animalia
- Phylum: Arthropoda
- Clade: Pancrustacea
- Class: Insecta
- Order: Hemiptera
- Suborder: Sternorrhyncha
- Family: Aphididae
- Genus: Rhopalomyzus; Mordvilko, 1921

Genus of true bugs

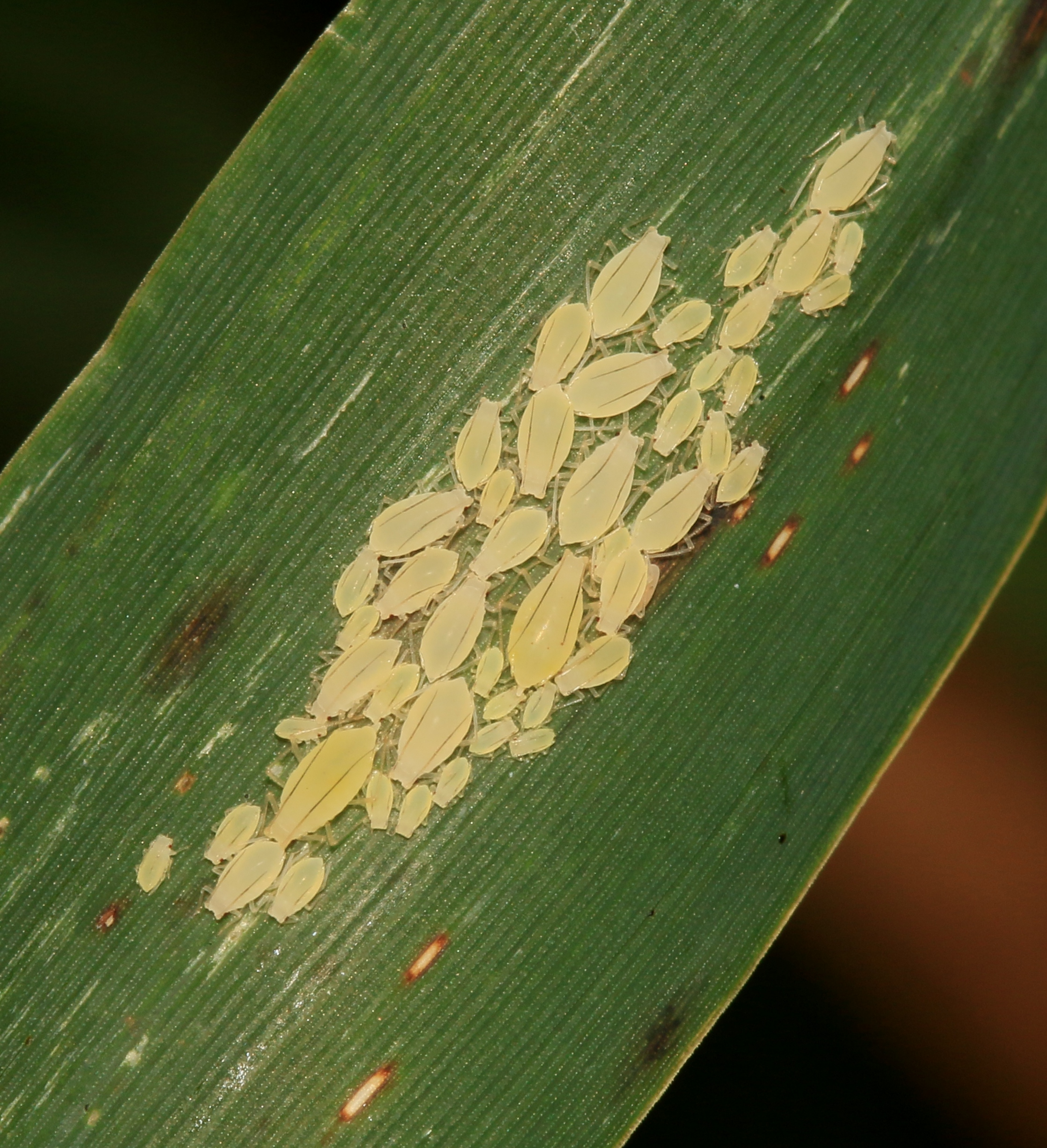
A colony of Rhopalomyzus lonicerae aphids clustered on a blade of grass in Saltoun Wood, East Lothian, Scotland

Rhopalomyzus is a genus of true bugs belonging to the family Aphididae.

The species of this genus are found in Europe and Northern America.

Species:

- Rhopalomyzus alaica
- Rhopalomyzus codonopsidis
- Rhopalomyzus grabhami (Cockerell, 1903)
