= Delphiniobium =

Scientific classification
- Domain: Eukaryota
- Kingdom: Animalia
- Phylum: Arthropoda
- Class: Insecta
- Order: Hemiptera
- Suborder: Sternorrhyncha
- Family: Aphididae
- Genus: Delphiniobium; Mordvilko, 1914

Genus of true bugs

Delphiniobium is a genus of true bugs belonging to the family Aphididae.

The species of this genus are found in Europe.

Species:

- Delphiniobium aconitifoliae Zhang, Guangxue & Qiao, 2000
