= Liosomaphis =

Scientific classification
- Kingdom: Animalia
- Phylum: Arthropoda
- Class: Insecta
- Order: Hemiptera
- Suborder: Sternorrhyncha
- Family: Aphididae
- Genus: Liosomaphis; Walker, 1868

Genus of true bugs

Liosomaphis is a genus of true bugs belonging to the family Aphididae.

The species of this genus are found in Europe and Northern America.

Species:

- Liosomaphis atra Hille Ris Lambers, 1966
- Liosomaphis berberidis (Kaltenbach, 1843)
