= Neoamphorophora =

Scientific classification
- Kingdom: Animalia
- Phylum: Arthropoda
- Class: Insecta
- Order: Hemiptera
- Suborder: Sternorrhyncha
- Family: Aphididae
- Genus: Neoamphorophora; Mason, 1924

Genus of true bugs

Neoamphorophora is a genus of true bugs belonging to the family Aphididae.

The species of this genus are found in Europe and Northern America.

== Species ==
- Neoamphorophora kalmiae Mason, 1924
- Neoamphorophora ledi (Wahlgren, 1938)
