= Hydaphias =

Scientific classification
- Domain: Eukaryota
- Kingdom: Animalia
- Phylum: Arthropoda
- Class: Insecta
- Order: Hemiptera
- Suborder: Sternorrhyncha
- Family: Aphididae
- Genus: Hydaphias; Börner, 1930

Genus of true bugs

Hydaphias is a genus of true bugs belonging to the family Aphididae.

The species of this genus are found in Europe.

Species:

- Hydaphias carpaticae Mamontova-Solukha, 1966
- Hydaphias helvetica Hille Ris Lambers, 1947
