= Myzaphis =

Scientific classification
- Domain: Eukaryota
- Kingdom: Animalia
- Phylum: Arthropoda
- Class: Insecta
- Order: Hemiptera
- Suborder: Sternorrhyncha
- Family: Aphididae
- Genus: Myzaphis; Goot, 1913

Genus of true bugs

Myzaphis is a genus of true bugs belonging to the family Aphididae.

The species of this genus are found in Europe and Northern America.

Species:

- Myzaphis bucktoni Jacob, 1946
- Myzaphis juchnevitschae Kadyrbekov, 1993
