= Pleotrichophorus =

Scientific classification
- Domain: Eukaryota
- Kingdom: Animalia
- Phylum: Arthropoda
- Class: Insecta
- Order: Hemiptera
- Suborder: Sternorrhyncha
- Family: Aphididae
- Genus: Pleotrichophorus; Börner, 1930

Genus of insects

Pleotrichophorus is a genus of true bugs belonging to the family Aphididae.

The species of this genus are found in Europe, Southeastern Asia and Northern America.

Species:

- Pleotrichophorus achilleae Holman, 1965
- Pleotrichophorus ambrosiae Hille Ris Lambers, 1969
