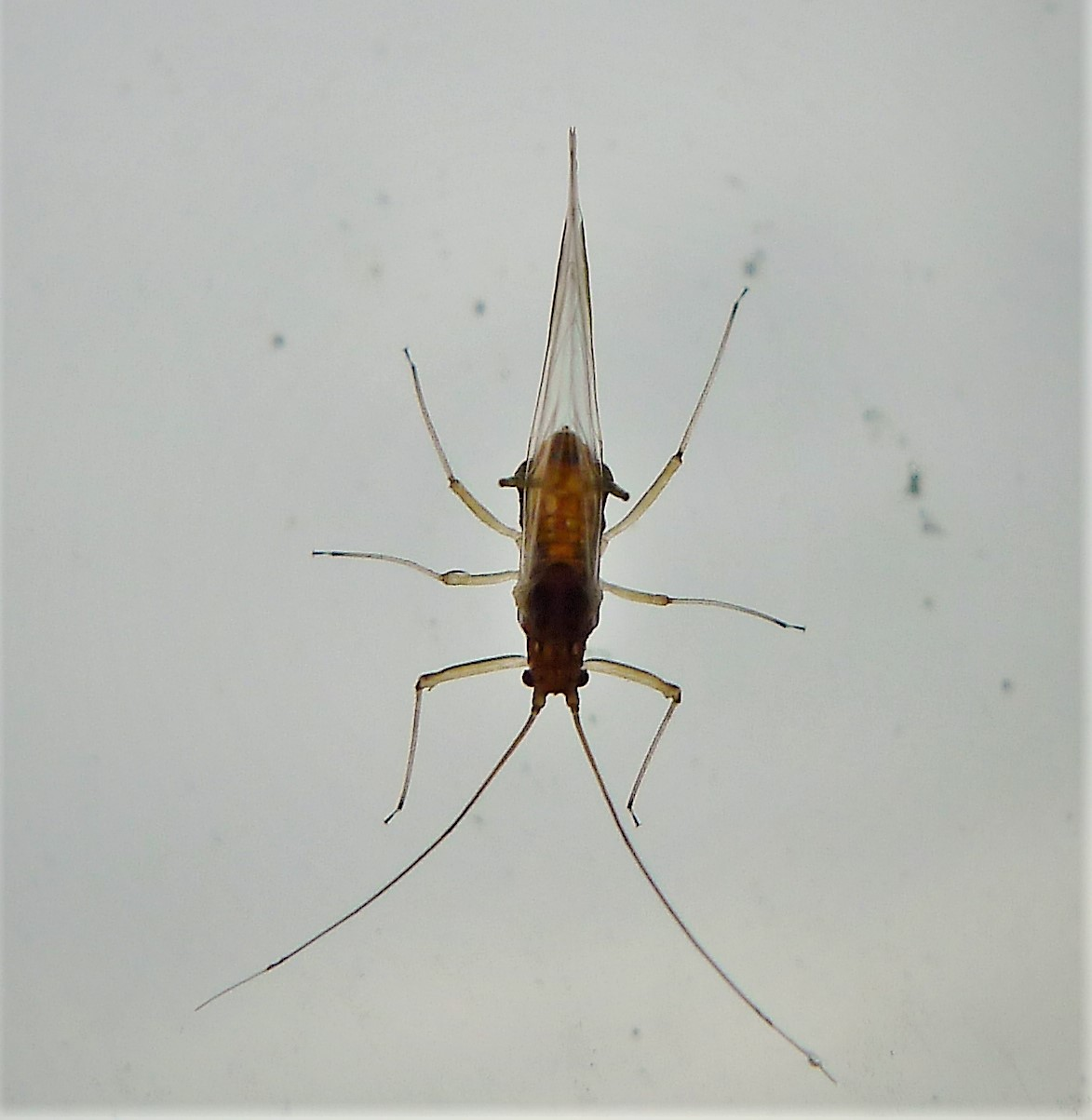
- Microlophium carnosum alate

Scientific classification
- Domain: Eukaryota
- Kingdom: Animalia
- Phylum: Arthropoda
- Class: Insecta
- Order: Hemiptera
- Suborder: Sternorrhyncha
- Family: Aphididae
- Genus: Microlophium; Mordvilko, 1914

= Microlophium =

Genus of true bugs

Microlophium is a genus of true bugs belonging to the family Aphididae.

The species of this genus are found in Europe and Northern America.

Species:

- Microlophium carnosum (Buckton, 1876)
- Microlophium primulae (Theobald, 1913)
