= Pterocomma =

Scientific classification
- Domain: Eukaryota
- Kingdom: Animalia
- Phylum: Arthropoda
- Class: Insecta
- Order: Hemiptera
- Suborder: Sternorrhyncha
- Family: Aphididae
- Genus: Pterocomma; Buckton, 1879

Genus of true bugs

Pterocomma is a genus of true bugs belonging to the family Aphididae.

The species of this genus are found in Europe and Northern America.(;

Species:

- Pterocomma alpinum Zhang, Guangxue, Tiesen Zhong & Wanyu Zhang, 1992
- Pterocomma amargituberculum Zhang, Guangxue, Xiaolin Chen, Tiesen Zhong & Jing
