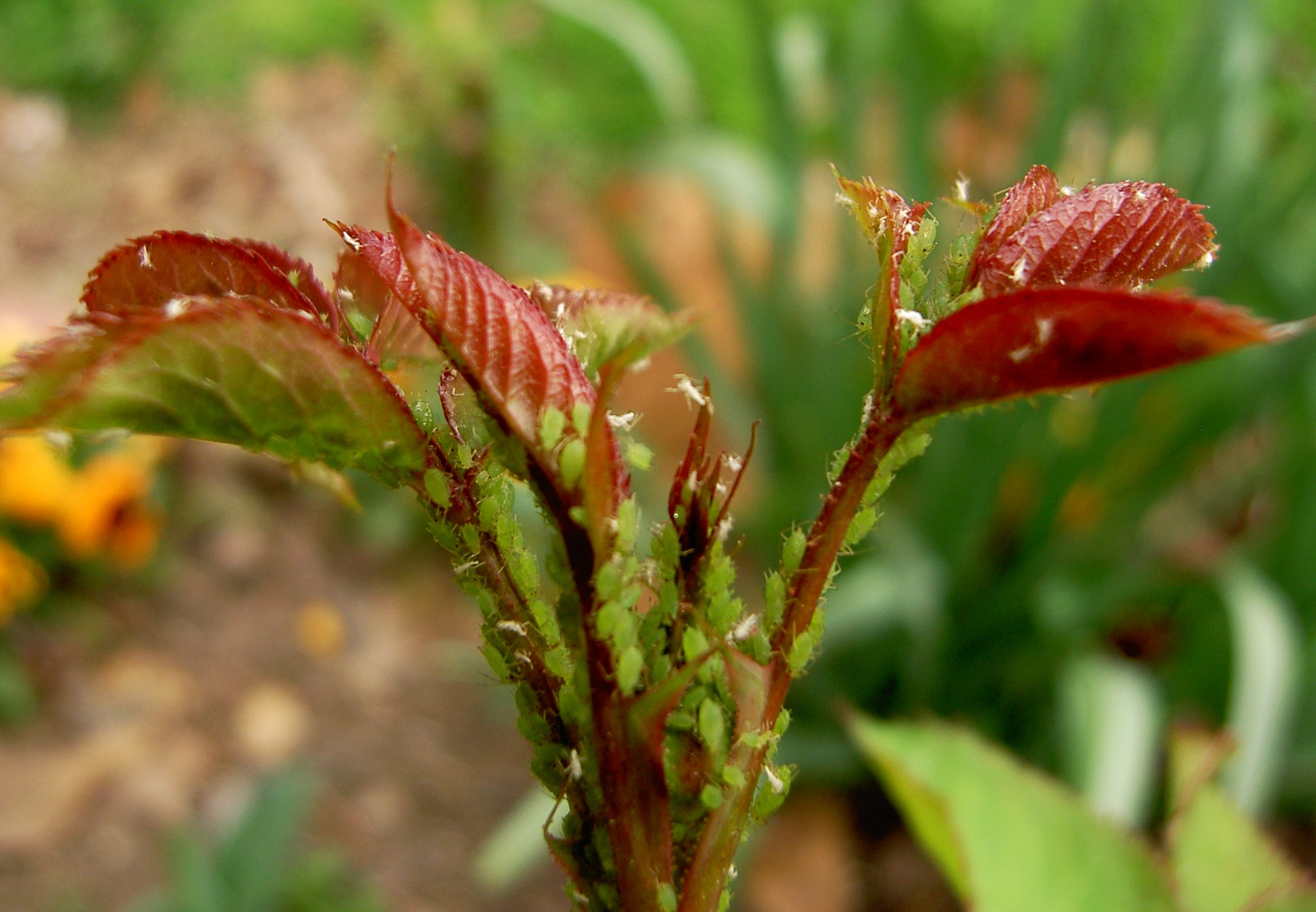
- Aphids on rose bush

Scientific classification
- Kingdom: Animalia
- Phylum: Arthropoda
- Class: Insecta
- Order: Hemiptera
- Suborder: Sternorrhyncha
- Family: Aphididae
- Subfamily: Aphidinae; Latreille, 1802

Tribes
- Aphidini; Macrosiphini

Diversity
- at least 280 genera

= Aphidinae =

Subfamily of true bugs

Aphidinae is an aphid subfamily in the family Aphididae.

Many species of aphids spread potyviruses and most are from the subfamily Aphidinae (genera Macrosiphum and Myzus). Most have alternative hosts, the primary host plant is usually a tree, and the secondary one is herbaceous.

== See also ==
- List of Aphidinae genera

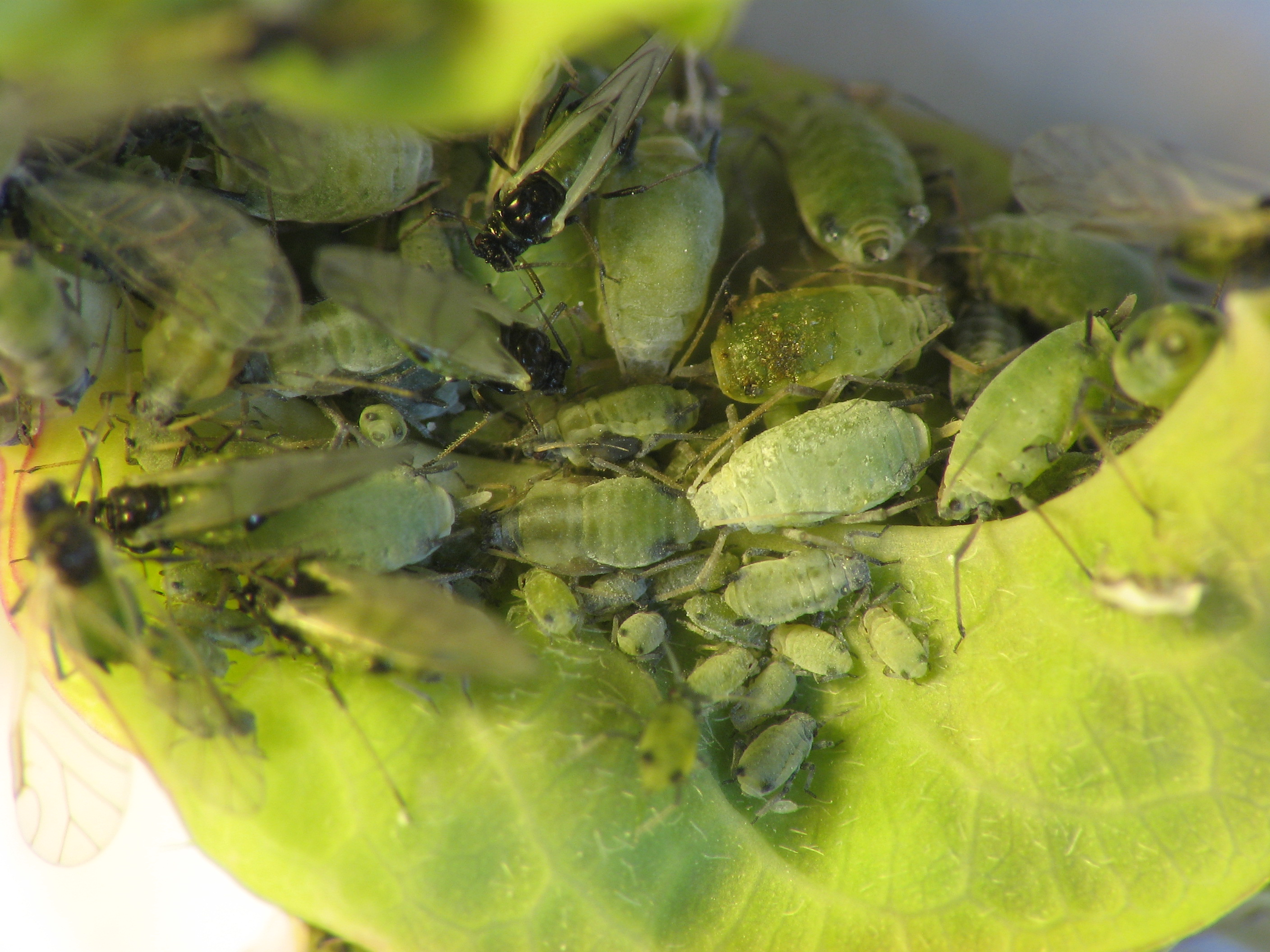
Hyadaphis on trumpet honeysuckle

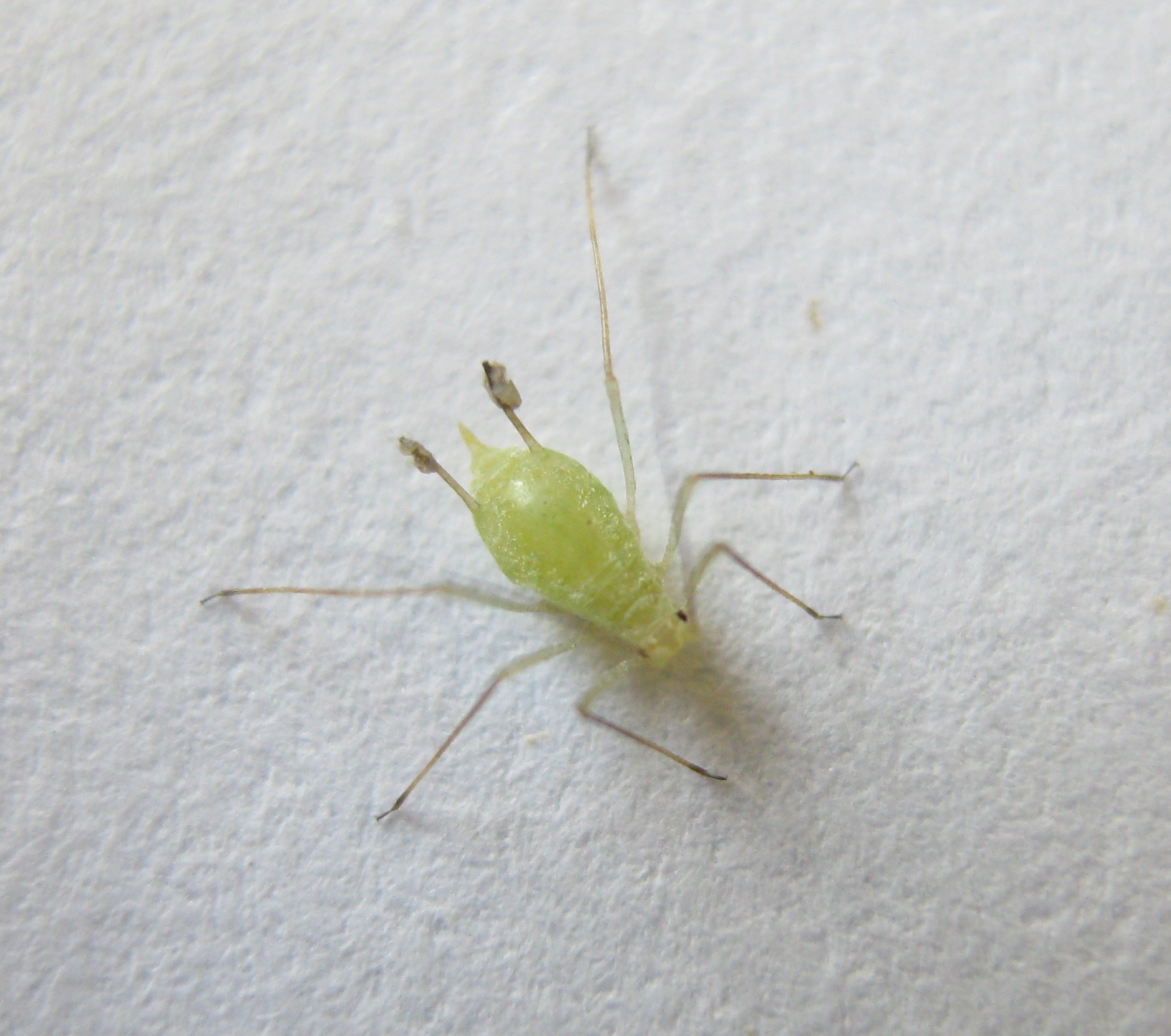
Illinoia liriodendri on a leaf of Liriodendron tulipifera
