= List of aphids of Sri Lanka =

Sri Lanka is a tropical island situated close to the southern tip of India. The invertebrate fauna is as large as it is common to other regions of the world. There are about 2 million species of arthropods found in the world, and still it is counting. So many new species are discover up to this time also. So it is very complicated and difficult to summarize the exact number of species found within a certain region.

The following list provide the aphid fauna of Sri Lanka.

== Aphids ==
Phylum: Arthropoda
Class: Insecta
Order: Hemiptera Superfamily: Aphidoidea

Aphids are minute insects that are plant sap feeders. They affect largely to economically valuable plants greatly, so aphids are of economic importance. About 4500 species with 500 genera are described in aphids. Out of them, Sri Lanka comprises 74 species in 46 genera and 6 subfamilies. 2 endemic aphid species found on Sri Lanka.

=== Family Aphididae ===
Subfamily: Aphidinae

- Acyrthosiphon gossypii
- Acyrthosiphon kondoi
- Acyrthosiphon pisum
- Akkaia taiwana
- Aphis craccivora
- Aphis fabae - ssp.solanella
- Aphis gossypii
- Aphis nasturtii
- Aphis nerii
- Aphis spiraecola
- Neomyzus circumflexus = Aulacorthum circumflexus
- Aulacorthum solani
- Brachycaudus helichrysi
- Chaetosiphon tetrarhodum
- Dysaphis crataegi
- Hyalopterus pruni
- Hysteroneura setariae
- Ipuka dispersum
- Lipaphis erysimi
- Macrosiphoniella sanborni
- Macrosiphoniella pseudoartemisiae
- Macrosiphum euphorbiae
- Macrosiphum rosae
- Matsumuraja capitophoroides - endemic
- Melanaphis sacchari
- Micromyzus judenkoi
- Micromyzus kalimpongensis
- Micromyzus nigrum
- Myzus ascalonicus
- Myzus boehmeriae
- Myzus cerasi
- Myzus obtusirostris
- Myzus ornatus
- Myzus persicae
- Neotoxoptera oliveri
- Pentalonia nigronervosa
- Phorodon humuli
- Rhopalosiphum maidis
- Rhodobium porosum
- Rhopalosiphoninus latysiphon
- Rhopalosiphum padi
- Rhopalosiphum rufiabdominale
- Schizaphis rotundiventris
- Schizaphis graminum
- Schizaphis hypersiphonata
- Schizaphis minuta
- Sinomegoura citricola
- Sitobion avenae
- Sitobion lambersi
- Sitobion leelamaniae
- Sitobion miscanthi
- Sitobion pauliani
- Sitobion phyllanthi
- Sitobion wikstroemiae
- Toxoptera aurantii
- Toxoptera citricida
- Toxoptera odinae
- Uroleucon minutum
- Vesiculaphis caricis

Subfamily: Drepanosiphinae

- Shivaphis celti
- Tinocallis kahawaluokalani

Subfamily: Greenideinae

- Greenidea artocarpi
- Greenidea formosana
- Greenideoida ceyloniae
- Schoutedenia lutea

Subfamily: Hormaphidinae

- Astegopteryx bambusae
- Astegopteryx insularis
- Astegopteryx minuta
- Cerataphis brasiliensis
- Ceratoglyphina bambusae
- Ceratovacuna lanigera
- Pseudoregma bambucicola

Subfamily: Lachninae - Giant aphids

- Ceratopemphigus zehntneri - endemic
- Eriosoma lanigerum
- Geoica lucifuga
- Kaltenbachiella elsholtriae
- Kaltenbachiella japonica
- Tetraneura nigriabdominalis
- Tetraneura yezoensis
