= List of Macrosiphoniella species =

These 157 species belong to Macrosiphoniella, a genus of aphids in the family Aphididae.

== Macrosiphoniella species ==
- Macrosiphoniella abrotani (Walker, F., 1852)^{c g}
- Macrosiphoniella absinthii (Linnaeus, 1758)^{c g}
- Macrosiphoniella achlys Zhang, Guangxue, Xiaolin Chen, Tiesen Zhong & Jing^{c g}
- Macrosiphoniella aetnensis Barbagallo, 1968^{c g}
- Macrosiphoniella ajaniae Kadyrbekov, 1999^{c g}
- Macrosiphoniella aktaschica ^{c g}
- Macrosiphoniella aktashica (Nevsky, 1928)^{c g}
- Macrosiphoniella alatavica (Nevsky, 1928)^{c g}
- Macrosiphoniella albiartemisiae Zhang, Guangxue, Xiaolin Chen, Tiesen Zhong & Jing^{c g}
- Macrosiphoniella albicola ^{c g}
- Macrosiphoniella altaica ^{c g}
- Macrosiphoniella annulata ^{c g}
- Macrosiphoniella antennata ^{c g}
- Macrosiphoniella arctica Pashtshenko, 1999^{c g}
- Macrosiphoniella arenariae Bozhko, 1954^{c g}
- Macrosiphoniella artemisiae (Boyer de Fonscolombe, 1841)^{c g}
- Macrosiphoniella asteris (Walker, F., 1849)^{c g}
- Macrosiphoniella atra (Ferrari, 1872)^{c g}
- Macrosiphoniella atrata ^{c g}
- Macrosiphoniella austriacae Bozhko, 1961^{c g}
- Macrosiphoniella borealis Pashtshenko, 1998^{c g}
- Macrosiphoniella bozhkoae Remaudière, G., 1997^{c g}
- Macrosiphoniella brevisiphona Zhang, Guangxue, 1981^{c g}
- Macrosiphoniella capillaricola Holman, Seungwhan Lee & Jan Havelka, 2006^{c g}
- Macrosiphoniella caucasica ^{c g}
- Macrosiphoniella cayratiae ^{c g}
- Macrosiphoniella cegmidi Szelegiewicz, 1963^{c g}
- Macrosiphoniella chaetosiphon Takahashi, R. & Moritsu, 1963^{c g}
- Macrosiphoniella chamaemelifoliae Remaudière, G. & Leclant, 1972^{c g}
- Macrosiphoniella cinerescens Hille Ris Lambers, 1966^{c g}
- Macrosiphoniella confusa Holman, Seungwhan Lee & Jan Havelka, 2006^{c g}
- Macrosiphoniella crassipes ^{c g}
- Macrosiphoniella crepidis Holman & Szelegiewicz, 1974^{c g}
- Macrosiphoniella cymbariae Bozhko, 1976^{c g}
- Macrosiphoniella davazhamci Holman & Szelegiewicz, 1974^{c g}
- Macrosiphoniella dimidiata Börner, 1942^{c g}
- Macrosiphoniella dracunculi ^{c g}
- Macrosiphoniella dubia (Ferrari, 1872)^{c g}
- Macrosiphoniella elegans Pashtshenko, 1999^{c g}
- Macrosiphoniella elenae Pashtshenko, 1999^{c g}
- Macrosiphoniella erigeronis Nevsky, 1928^{c g}
- Macrosiphoniella erythraea Zhang, Guangxue & Qiao, 1999^{c g}
- Macrosiphoniella femorata Bozhko, 1976^{c g}
- Macrosiphoniella flaviviridis Zhang, Guangxue, 1981^{c g}
- Macrosiphoniella formosartemisia Takahashi, 1921^{g}
- Macrosiphoniella formosartemisiae Takahashi, R., 1921^{c g}
- Macrosiphoniella frigidae ^{c g}
- Macrosiphoniella frigidicola Gillette & M.A. Palmer, 1928^{c g}
- Macrosiphoniella frigidivora Holman & Szelegiewicz, 1974^{c g}
- Macrosiphoniella galatellae Bozhko, 1953^{c g}
- Macrosiphoniella gaoloushana Zhang, Guangxue, Xiaolin Chen, Tiesen Zhong & Jing^{c g}
- Macrosiphoniella glabra (Gillette & Palmer, 1928)^{c g b}
- Macrosiphoniella gmelinicola Szelegiewicz, 1980^{c g}
- Macrosiphoniella grandicauda Takahashi, R. & Moritsu, 1963^{c g}
- Macrosiphoniella helichrysi Remaudière, 1952^{c g}
- Macrosiphoniella hikosanensis ^{c g}
- Macrosiphoniella hillerislambersi Ossiannilsson, 1954^{c g}
- Macrosiphoniella himalayana ^{c g}
- Macrosiphoniella hofuchui Zhang, Guangxue, Xiaolin Chen, Tiesen Zhong & Jing^{c g}
- Macrosiphoniella hokkaidensis Miyazaki, 1971^{c g}
- Macrosiphoniella huaidensis Zhang, Guangxue, 1980^{c g}
- Macrosiphoniella huochengensis Zhang, Guangxue, Xiaolin Chen, Tiesen Zhong & Jing^{c g}
- Macrosiphoniella insignata Kadyrbekov, 1999^{c g}
- Macrosiphoniella iranica Nieto Nafría & Pérez Hidalgo, 2013^{c g}
- Macrosiphoniella ixeridis Holman, Seungwhan Lee & Jan Havelka, 2006^{c g}
- Macrosiphoniella janckei Börner, 1939^{c g}
- Macrosiphoniella jankei Borner, 1939^{g}
- Macrosiphoniella jaroslavi Stekolshchikov & Khruleva, 2015^{c g}
- Macrosiphoniella kalimpongensis Basu, R.C. & D.N. Raychaudhuri, 1976^{c g}
- Macrosiphoniella karatavica Kadyrbekov, 2015^{c g}
- Macrosiphoniella kareliniae Kadyrbekov, Renxin & Shao, 2002^{c g}
- Macrosiphoniella kaufmanni Börner, 1940^{c g}
- Macrosiphoniella kermanensis Mehrparvar & Rezwani, 2007^{c g}
- Macrosiphoniella kikungshana ^{c g}
- Macrosiphoniella kirgisica ^{c g}
- Macrosiphoniella kuwayamai ^{c g}
- Macrosiphoniella lazoica Pashtshenko, 1999^{c g}
- Macrosiphoniella lena Pashtshenko, 1998^{c g}
- Macrosiphoniella leucanthemi (Ferrari, 1872)^{c g}
- Macrosiphoniella lidiae ^{c g}
- Macrosiphoniella lijiangensis Zhang, Guangxue, Tiesen Zhong & Wanyu Zhang, 1992^{c g}
- Macrosiphoniella linariae (Koch, C.L., 1855)^{c g}
- Macrosiphoniella lithospermi Bozhko, 1959^{c g}
- Macrosiphoniella longirostrata Holman & Szelegiewicz, 1974^{c g}
- Macrosiphoniella lopatini ^{c g}
- Macrosiphoniella ludovicianae (Oestlund, 1886)^{c g}
- Macrosiphoniella maculata ^{c g}
- Macrosiphoniella madeirensis Aguiar & Ilharco, 2005^{c g}
- Macrosiphoniella medvedevi (Bozhko, 1957)^{c g}
- Macrosiphoniella miestingeri (Börner, 1950)^{c g}
- Macrosiphoniella millefolii (De Geer, 1773)^{c g b}
- Macrosiphoniella mutellinae Börner, 1950^{c g}
- Macrosiphoniella myohyangsani Szelegiewicz, 1980^{c g}
- Macrosiphoniella nigropilosa ^{c g}
- Macrosiphoniella nitida Börner, 1950^{c g}
- Macrosiphoniella oblonga (Mordvilko, 1901)^{c g}
- Macrosiphoniella olgae ^{c g}
- Macrosiphoniella oronensis Szelegiewicz, 1980^{c g}
- Macrosiphoniella pallidipes Holman, Seungwhan Lee & Jan Havelka, 2006^{c g}
- Macrosiphoniella papillata Holman, 1962^{c g}
- Macrosiphoniella paradoxa ^{c g}
- Macrosiphoniella paraoblonga Basu, R.C. & D.N. Raychaudhuri, 1976^{c g}
- Macrosiphoniella paucisetosa Robinson, 1987^{c g}
- Macrosiphoniella pennsylvanica (Pepper, 1950)^{c g}
- Macrosiphoniella persequens (Walker, F., 1852)^{c g}
- Macrosiphoniella piceaphis (Zhang, Guangxue, Xiaolin Chen, Tiesen Zhong & Jin^{c g}
- Macrosiphoniella procerae Bozhko, 1953^{c g}
- Macrosiphoniella pseudoartemisiae Shinji, 1933^{c g}
- Macrosiphoniella pseudotanacetaria Holman, Seungwhan Lee & Jan Havelka, 2006^{c g}
- Macrosiphoniella ptarmicae Hille Ris Lambers, 1956^{c g}
- Macrosiphoniella pulvera (Walker, F., 1848)^{c g}
- Macrosiphoniella quinifontana Zhang, Guangxue, Xiaolin Chen, Tiesen Zhong & Jing^{c g}
- Macrosiphoniella remaudierei Barbagallo & Nieto Nafría, 2016^{c g}
- Macrosiphoniella riedeli Szelegiewicz, 1963^{c g}
- Macrosiphoniella sachalinensis Pashtshenko, 1998^{c g}
- Macrosiphoniella sanborni (Gillette, 1908)^{i c g b} (chrysanthemum aphid)
- Macrosiphoniella santolinifoliae Kadyrbekov, 1999^{c g}
- Macrosiphoniella saussureae ^{c g}
- Macrosiphoniella scepariae Bozhko, 1959^{c g}
- Macrosiphoniella sejuncta (Walker, F., 1848)^{c g}
- Macrosiphoniella seriphidii Kadyrbekov, 2000^{c g}
- Macrosiphoniella sibirica ^{c g}
- Macrosiphoniella sieversianae Holman & Szelegiewicz, 1974^{c g}
- Macrosiphoniella sikhotealinensis Pashtshenko, 1998^{c g}
- Macrosiphoniella sikkimartemisiae Agarwala & D.N. Raychaudhuri, 1977^{c g}
- Macrosiphoniella silvestrii Roberti, 1954^{c g}
- Macrosiphoniella similioblonga Zhang, Guangxue, 1980^{c g}
- Macrosiphoniella sojaki Holman & Szelegiewicz, 1974^{c g}
- Macrosiphoniella soosi Szelegiewicz, 1966^{c g}
- Macrosiphoniella spinipes Basu, A.N., 1968^{c g}
- Macrosiphoniella staegeri Hille Ris Lambers, 1947^{c g}
- Macrosiphoniella subaequalis Börner, 1942^{c g}
- Macrosiphoniella subterranea (Koch, C.L., 1855)^{c g}
- Macrosiphoniella sudhakaris Banerjee, H., A.K. Ghosh & D.N. Raychaudhuri, 1969^{c g}
- Macrosiphoniella szalaymarzsoi Szelegiewicz, 1978^{c g}
- Macrosiphoniella tadshikana ^{c g}
- Macrosiphoniella taesongsanensis Szelegiewicz, 1980^{c g}
- Macrosiphoniella tanacetaria (Kaltenbach, 1843)^{c g b} (tansy aphid)
- Macrosiphoniella tapuskae (Hottes & Frison, 1931)^{c g}
- Macrosiphoniella teriolana Hille Ris Lambers, 1931^{c g}
- Macrosiphoniella terraealbae Kadyrbekov, 2000^{c g}
- Macrosiphoniella tsizhongi Zhang, Guangxue, Xiaolin Chen, Tiesen Zhong & Jing^{c g}
- Macrosiphoniella tuberculata (Nevsky, 1928)^{c g}
- Macrosiphoniella tuberculatumartemisicola Bozhko, 1957^{c g}
- Macrosiphoniella turanica Narzikulov & Umarov, 1969^{c g}
- Macrosiphoniella umarovi ^{c g}
- Macrosiphoniella usquertensis Hille Ris Lambers, 1935^{c g}
- Macrosiphoniella vallesiacae Jorg & Lampel, 1988^{c g}
- Macrosiphoniella victoriae Kadyrbekov, 1999^{c g}
- Macrosiphoniella xeranthemi Bozhko, 1959^{c g}
- Macrosiphoniella xinjiangica Kadyrbekov, Renxin & Shao, 2002^{c g}
- Macrosiphoniella yangi Takahashi, R., 1937^{c g}
- Macrosiphoniella yomenae (Shinji, 1922)^{c g}
- Macrosiphoniella yomogicola (Matsumura, 1917)^{c g}
- Macrosiphoniella yomogifoliae (Shinji, 1922)^{c g}
- Macrosiphoniella zayuensis Zhang, Guangxue, 1981^{c g}
- Macrosiphoniella zeya Pashtshenko, 1998^{c g}

Data sources: i = ITIS, c = Catalogue of Life, g = GBIF, b = Bugguide.net
