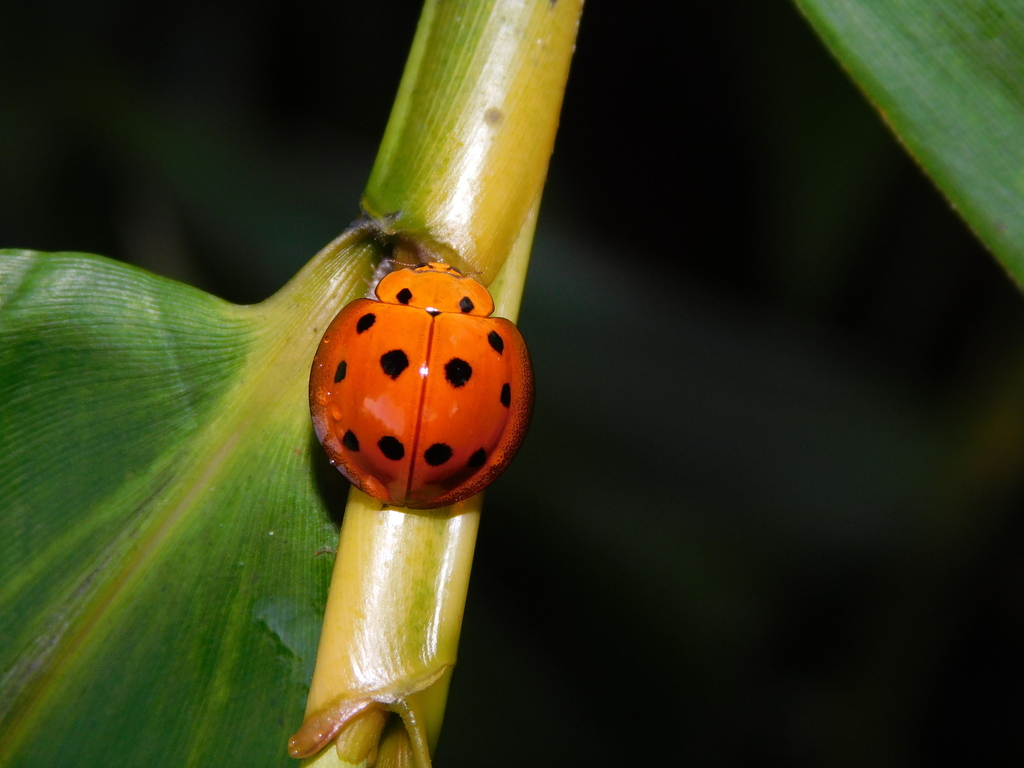

Scientific classification
- Kingdom: Animalia
- Phylum: Arthropoda
- Clade: Pancrustacea
- Class: Insecta
- Order: Coleoptera
- Suborder: Polyphaga
- Infraorder: Cucujiformia
- Family: Coccinellidae
- Subfamily: Coccinellinae
- Tribe: Coccinellini
- Genus: Megalocaria
- Species: M. dilatata

Binomial name
- Megalocaria dilatata (Fabricius, 1775)

Synonyms
- Coccinella dilatata Fabricius, 1775; Caria dilatata Mulsant; Anisolemnia dilatata Korschefsky; Coccinella aucta Illiger, 1801

= Megalocaria dilatata =

Species of beetle

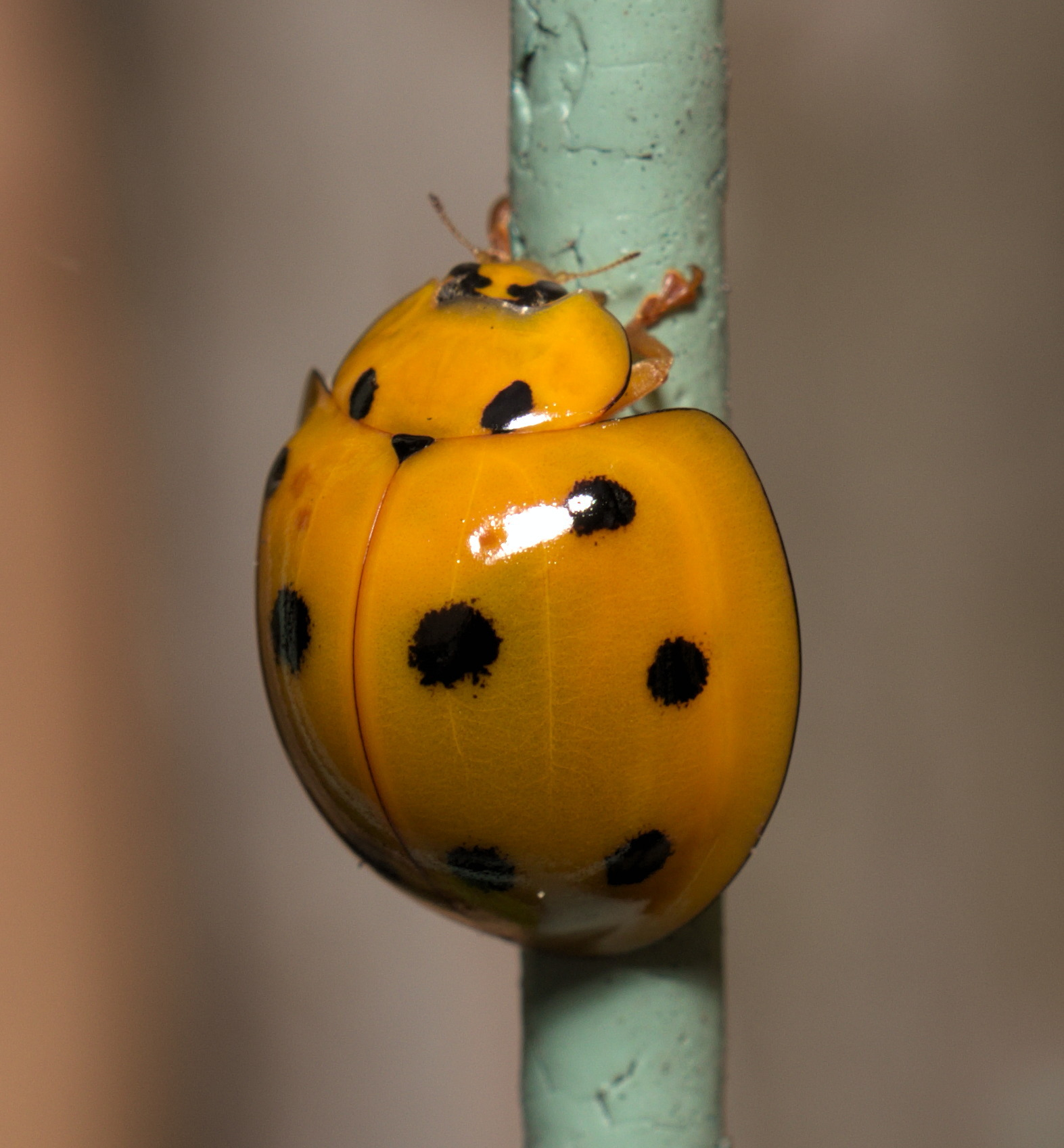
Megalocaria dilatata, China

Megalocaria dilatata, is a species of lady beetle native to India, Sri Lanka and Bhutan.

== Description ==
Body length is about 11 mm.This large ladybeetle has a circular outline and hemispherical strongly convex dorsum. Body bright orange to yellowish. There are ten black spots on elytra (five in each elytron). Spots are arranged in three rows of 1:2:2 fashion. Lateral margin of pronotum and elytral anterolateral margins are black. There is a diamond-shaped elongate spot on either side of inner margin of eyes on head. Scutellum totally black. Elytral marginal portion is much darker than the rest of the elytra. Elytra glabrous and finely punctate. Elytral interspace covered with micro sculptures. Ventrally, there is a prominent black spot found at the line of metasternum, and elytral epipleuron. Pronotum faint orange to yellow in color with two prominent black spots which are located on either side of scutellum.

== Biology ==
Body length is about 2.5 to 2.8 mm. Mating takes place in the morning. After the mating, female lays about 6 to 34 eggs in clutches. Egg stage is about 4 days. Larva undergo 4 instar stages, which lasted for about 9 days. The pre-pupal stage is about 2 days and the pupal stage is 3 days. The lifespan of adult female is about 55 days, whereas male has a lifespan of about 47 days. Larva is a voracious predator of many aphid species such as, Astegopteryx, and Aleurocanthus.

Adults are also predators of woolly aphids which infest bamboo and sugarcane such as Astegopteryx minima, Astegopteryx bambusae, Ceratovacuna silvestrii, and Pyrolachnus pyri.
