= Rhodobium =

Rhodobium may refer to:

- Rhodobium (insect), genus of true bugs in the family Aphididae
- Rhodobium (bacterium), a bacterium genus in the family Rhodobiaceae
