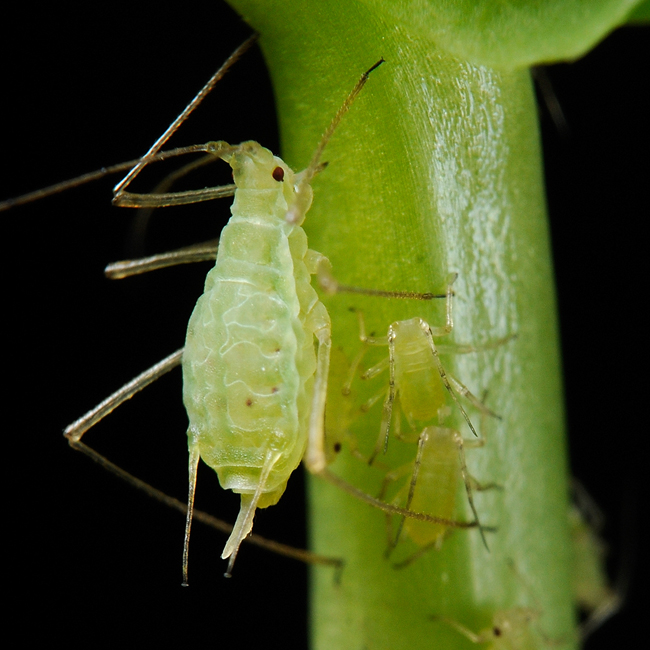
- Acyrthosiphon

Scientific classification
- Domain: Eukaryota
- Kingdom: Animalia
- Phylum: Arthropoda
- Class: Insecta
- Order: Hemiptera
- Suborder: Sternorrhyncha
- Family: Aphididae
- Subfamily: Aphidinae
- Tribe: Macrosiphini
- Genus: Acyrthosiphon; Mordvilko, 1914

= Acyrthosiphon =

Genus of true bugs

Acyrthosiphon is a genus of aphids belonging to the family Aphididae.

The genus was described in 1914 by Alexander Mordvilko.

The genus has cosmopolitan distribution.

== Species ==
These species belong to the genus Acyrthosiphon:

- Acyrthosiphon argus Miyazaki, 1991
- Acyrthosiphon artibreve Zhang, 1981
- Acyrthosiphon assiniboinensis Robinson, 1973
- Acyrthosiphon astragali Eastop, 1971
- Acyrthosiphon auctum (Walker, 1849)
- Acyrthosiphon auriculae Martin, 1981
- Acyrthosiphon bidenticola Smith, 1960
- Acyrthosiphon bistorti
- Acyrthosiphon boreale Hille Ris Lambers, 1952
- Acyrthosiphon brachysiphon Hille Ris Lambers, 1952
- Acyrthosiphon brevicorne Hille Ris Lambers, 1960
- Acyrthosiphon capitellum Zhang, 1998
- Acyrthosiphon caraganae (Cholodkovsky, 1907) (caragana aphid)
- Acyrthosiphon chelidonii (Kaltenbach, 1843)
- Acyrthosiphon churchillense Robinson, 1979
- Acyrthosiphon corsicae Remaudière & Leclant, 2000
- Acyrthosiphon crepidis
- Acyrthosiphon cyparissiae (Koch, 1855)
- Acyrthosiphon daphnidis Ilharco, 1996
- Acyrthosiphon dauricum Szelegiewicz, 1963
- Acyrthosiphon dryasae Pashtshenko, 2005
- Acyrthosiphon echinospartii Nieto Nafria & Mier Durante, 1987
- Acyrthosiphon elaeocarpi Tao, 1963
- Acyrthosiphon emeljanovi Mordvilko, 1914
- Acyrthosiphon ericetorum Hille Ris Lambers, 1959
- Acyrthosiphon euphorbiae Börner, 1940
- Acyrthosiphon evodiae
- Acyrthosiphon extremiorientale Pashtshenko, 2005
- Acyrthosiphon fragariaevescae
- Acyrthosiphon fragum Zhang, 1998
- Acyrthosiphon galijae Kadyrbekov, 2005
- Acyrthosiphon genistae Mordvilko, 1914
- Acyrthosiphon ghanii Eastop, 1971
- Acyrthosiphon glaucii
- Acyrthosiphon gossypicola
- Acyrthosiphon gossypii Mordvilko, 1914
- Acyrthosiphon hamiense Zhang, Chen, Zhong & Li, 1999
- Acyrthosiphon heptapotamicum Kadyrbekov, 2005
- Acyrthosiphon hissaricum
- Acyrthosiphon ignotum Mordvilko, 1914
- Acyrthosiphon ilka Mordvilko, 1914
- Acyrthosiphon kamtshatkanum Mordvilko, 1914
- Acyrthosiphon kapustjanae Pashtshenko, 2005
- Acyrthosiphon knechteli (Börner, 1950)
- Acyrthosiphon kondoi Shinji, 1938
- Acyrthosiphon lactucae (Passerini, 1860)
- Acyrthosiphon lambersi Leclant & Remaudière, 1974
- Acyrthosiphon leleji Pashtshenko, 2005
- Acyrthosiphon leonurae Pashtshenko, 2005
- Acyrthosiphon lobkovae Pashtshenko, 2005
- Acyrthosiphon loti (Theobald, 1913)
- Acyrthosiphon macrosiphum (Wilson, 1912)
- Acyrthosiphon malvae (Mosley, 1841)
- Acyrthosiphon matilei Remaudière & Leclant, 2000
- Acyrthosiphon moltshanovi Mordvilko, 1914
- Acyrthosiphon mordvilkoi Nevsky, 1928
- Acyrthosiphon myricae Pashtshenko, 2005
- Acyrthosiphon navozovi Mordvilko, 1914
- Acyrthosiphon nigripes Hille Ris Lambers, 1935
- Acyrthosiphon norvegicum Mordvilko, 1914
- Acyrthosiphon orientale Mordvilko, 1914
- Acyrthosiphon pamiricum Nevsky, 1929
- Acyrthosiphon papaverinum
- Acyrthosiphon papaverisuctum (Zhang, Chen, Zhong & Li, 1999)
- Acyrthosiphon pareuphorbiae Zhang, 1980
- Acyrthosiphon parvum Börner, 1950
- Acyrthosiphon pentatrichopus Hille Ris Lambers, 1974
- Acyrthosiphon phaseoli Chakrabarti, Ghosh & Raychaudhuri, 1971
- Acyrthosiphon pilosum Nieto Nafría, Aldea & Castro, 2015
- Acyrthosiphon pisivorum Zhang, 1980
- Acyrthosiphon pisum (Harris, 1776) (pea aphid)
- Acyrthosiphon porrifolii (Börner, 1950)
- Acyrthosiphon primulae (Theobald, 1913)
- Acyrthosiphon pseudodirhodum (Patch, 1919)
- Acyrthosiphon ranunculum
- Acyrthosiphon rubi Narzikulov, 1957
- Acyrthosiphon rubifoliae
- Acyrthosiphon rumicis Narzikulov, 1969
- Acyrthosiphon saussureae Pashtshenko, 2005
- Acyrthosiphon scalare (Richards, 1963)
- Acyrthosiphon scariolae Nevsky, 1929
- Acyrthosiphon shinanonum Miyazaki, 1971
- Acyrthosiphon soldatovi Mordvilko, 1914
- Acyrthosiphon sophorae Narzikulov & Umarov, 1969
- Acyrthosiphon supranubius Carnero Hernández & Nieto Nafría, 1995
- Acyrthosiphon svalbardicum Heikenheimo, 1968
- Acyrthosiphon thracicum Tashev, 1962
- Acyrthosiphon vandenboschi Hille Ris Lambers, 1974
- Acyrthosiphon vasiljevi
- Acyrthosiphon wasintae (Hottes, 1933)
