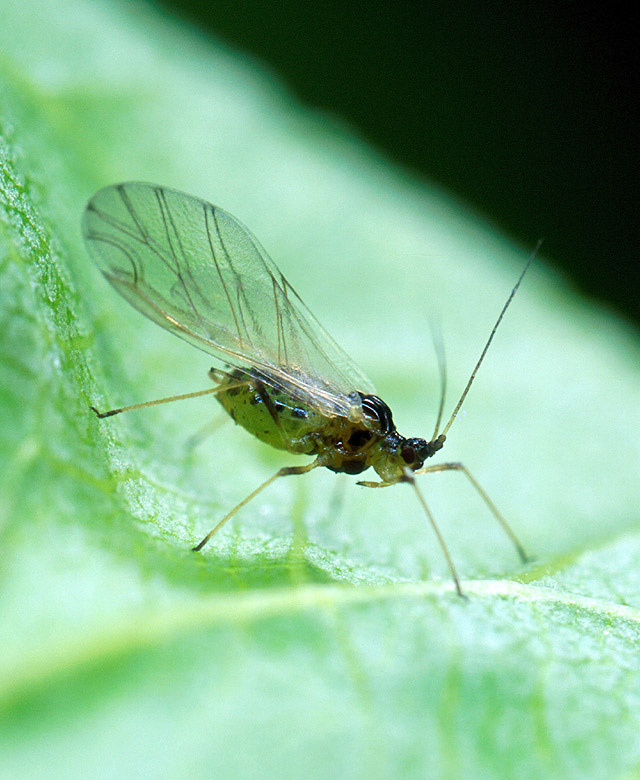
- Myzus persicae

Scientific classification
- Domain: Eukaryota
- Kingdom: Animalia
- Phylum: Arthropoda
- Class: Insecta
- Order: Hemiptera
- Suborder: Sternorrhyncha
- Family: Aphididae
- Subfamily: Aphidinae
- Tribe: Macrosiphini
- Genus: Myzus; Passerini, 1860

= Myzus =

Genus of true bugs

Myzus is a genus of true bugs belonging to the family Aphididae.

The genus has cosmopolitan distribution. Its original distribution is the Old World.

Species:

- Myzus ajugae Schouteden, 1903
- Myzus amygdalinus (Nevsky, 1928)
- Myzus antirrhinii (Macchiati, 1883)
- Myzus asamensis
- Myzus ascalonicus Doncaster, 1946
- Myzus asiaticus (Szelegiewicz, 1969)
- Myzus asterale Choi, Kim, Lee, Lee, Shin & Lee, 2019
- Myzus asteriae Shinji, 1941
- Myzus berchemiae
- Myzus beybienkoi (Narzikulov, 1957)
- Myzus biennis Sanborn, 1904
- Myzus boehmeriae Takahashi, 1923
- Myzus borealis Ossiannilsson, 1959
- Myzus brevisiphon Basu, 1969
- Myzus cerasi (Fabricius, 1775)
- Myzus certus (Walker, 1849)
- Myzus compositae (Takahashi, 1965)
- Myzus convolvuli Kaltenbach, 1843
- Myzus cornutus
- Myzus cymbalariae Stroyan, 1954
- Myzus debregeasiae Noordam, 2004
- Myzus dianthicola Hille Ris Lambers, 1966
- Myzus duriatae Noordam, 2004
- Myzus dycei Carver, 1961
- Myzus erythraeae Mamontova, 1979
- Myzus fataunae Shinji, 1924
- Myzus filicis Basu, 1969
- Myzus formosanus Takahashi, 1923
- Myzus galinarium
- Myzus godetiae
- Myzus gumi Shinji, 1922
- Myzus hemerocallis Takahashi, 1921
- Myzus icelandicus Blackman, 1986
- Myzus indicus Basu & Raychaudhuri, 1976
- Myzus inuzakurae
- Myzus isodonis (Takahashi, 1965)
- Myzus japonensis Miyazaki, 1968
- Myzus kalimpongensis (Ghosh, Basu & Raychaudhuri, 1976)
- Myzus kawatabiensis Miyazaki, 1971
- Myzus kokusaki
- Myzus komaumii
- Myzus lactucicola
- Myzus langei (Börner, 1933)
- Myzus lefroyi Basu & Raychaudhuri, 1976
- Myzus ligustri (Mosley, 1841)
- Myzus linariae Holman, 1965
- Myzus lythri (Schrank, 1801)
- Myzus maculocorpus Basu & Raychaudhuri, 1976
- Myzus manoji Basu & Raychaudhuri, 1976
- Myzus matricariae Macchiati, 1882
- Myzus meghalayensis Basu & Raychaudhuri, 1976
- Myzus moriokae Shinji, 1941
- Myzus mumecola (Matsumura, 1917)
- Myzus mushaensis Takahashi, 1931
- Myzus myosotidis (Börner, 1950)
- Myzus negifoliae
- Myzus obako (Shinji, 1922)
- Myzus obtusirostris David, Narayanan & Rajasingh, 1972
- Myzus oenotherae Williams, 1911
- Myzus ornatus Laing, 1932
- Myzus padellus Hille Ris Lambers & Rogerson, 1946
- Myzus persicae (Sulzer, 1776)
- Myzus philadelphi
- Myzus pileae
- Myzus plectranthi Shinji, 1939
- Myzus polaris Hille Ris Lambers, 1952
- Myzus polygoniyonai
- Myzus portulacae Macchiati, 1883
- Myzus prunense Choi, Kim, Lee, Lee, Shin & Lee, 2019
- Myzus prunisuctus Zhang, 1980
- Myzus raphanense Choi, Kim, Lee, Lee, Shin & Lee, 2019
- Myzus sansho
- Myzus siegesbeckiae
- Myzus siegesbeckicola Strand, 1929
- Myzus sorbi Bhattacharya & Chakrabarti, 1982
- Myzus stellariae Strand, 1929
- Myzus targionii Del Guercio, 1894
- Myzus titschaki (Börner, 1942)
- Myzus varians Davidson, 1912
- Myzus xanthomelii Shinji, 1941
- Myzus yangi
- Myzus yomogi Shinji, 1922
