= Kaltenbachiella =

Scientific classification
- Domain: Eukaryota
- Kingdom: Animalia
- Phylum: Arthropoda
- Class: Insecta
- Order: Hemiptera
- Suborder: Sternorrhyncha
- Family: Aphididae
- Subfamily: Eriosomatinae
- Tribe: Eriosomatini
- Genus: Kaltenbachiella; Schouteden, 1906

Genus of true bugs

Kaltenbachiella is a genus of insect belonging to the family Aphididae.

The genus was first described by Schouteden in 1906.

Species:

- Kaltenbachiella elsholtriae
- Kaltenbachiella japonica
- Kaltenbachiella pallida
