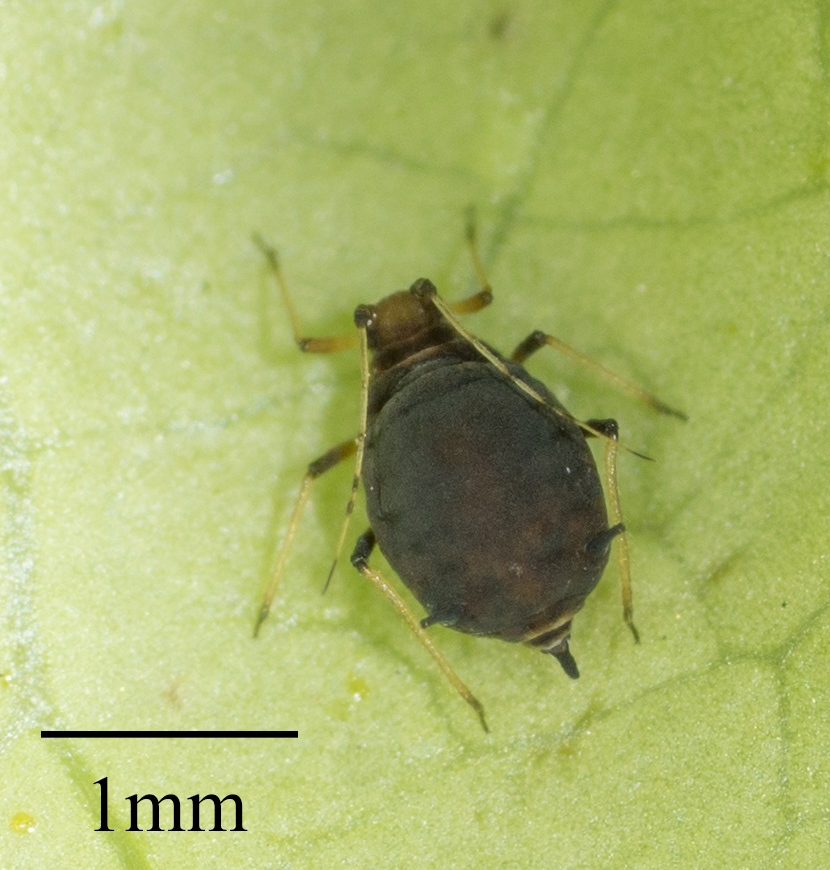
- Toxoptera aurantii

Scientific classification
- Domain: Eukaryota
- Kingdom: Animalia
- Phylum: Arthropoda
- Class: Insecta
- Order: Hemiptera
- Suborder: Sternorrhyncha
- Family: Aphididae
- Genus: Toxoptera; Koch, 1856

= Toxoptera =

Genus of true bugs

Toxoptera is a genus of true bugs belonging to the family Aphididae.

The species of this genus are found in Australia.

Species:

- Toxoptera aurantii
- Toxoptera citricida
- Toxoptera hsui Hsu, 1980
- Toxoptera odinae
- Toxoptera schlingeri Tao, 1961
