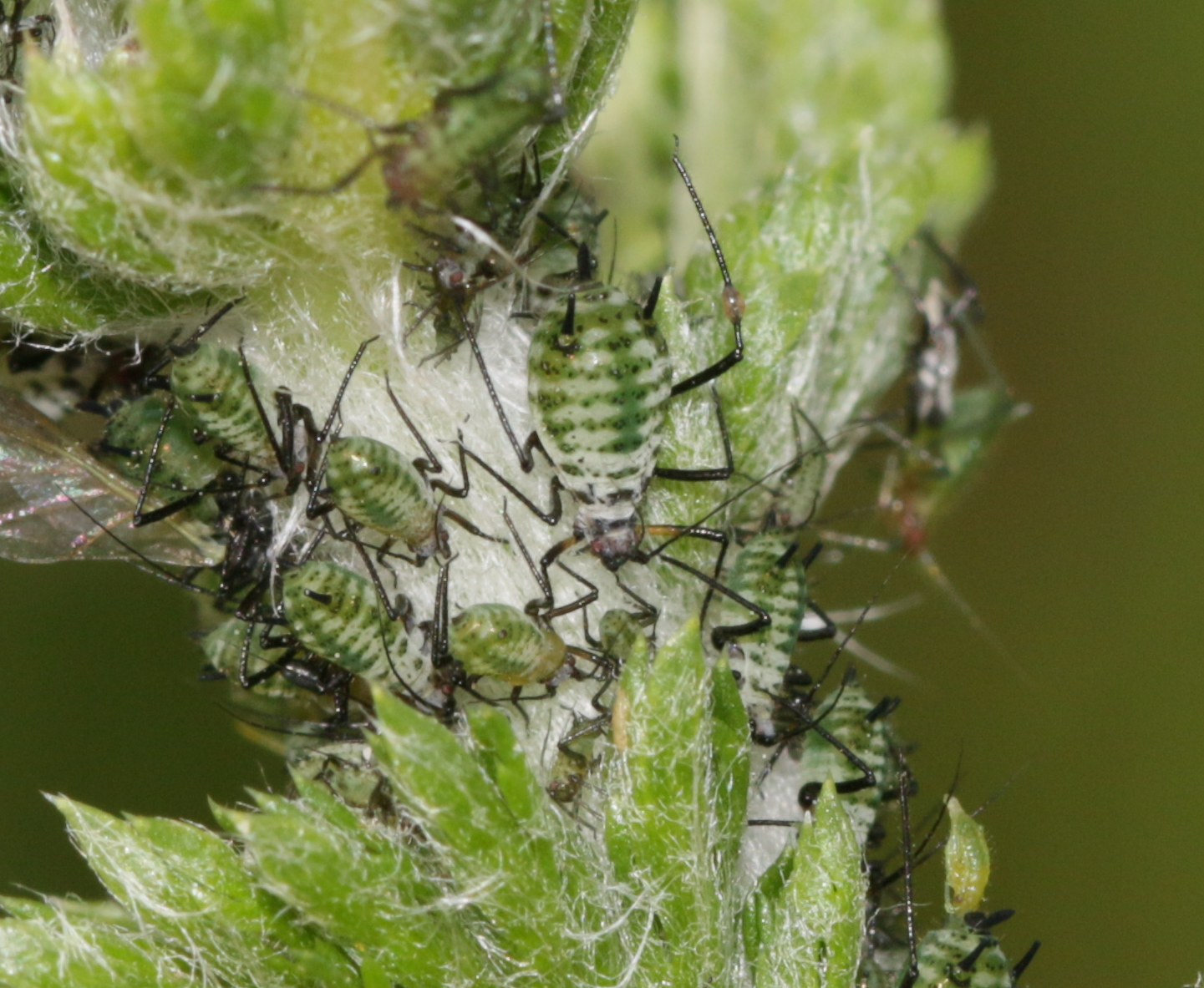

Scientific classification
- Domain: Eukaryota
- Kingdom: Animalia
- Phylum: Arthropoda
- Class: Insecta
- Order: Hemiptera
- Suborder: Sternorrhyncha
- Family: Aphididae
- Genus: Macrosiphoniella
- Species: M. millefolii

Binomial name
- Macrosiphoniella millefolii (De Geer, 1773)

= Macrosiphoniella millefolii =

Species of true bug

Macrosiphoniella millefolii is a species of aphid in the family Aphididae.

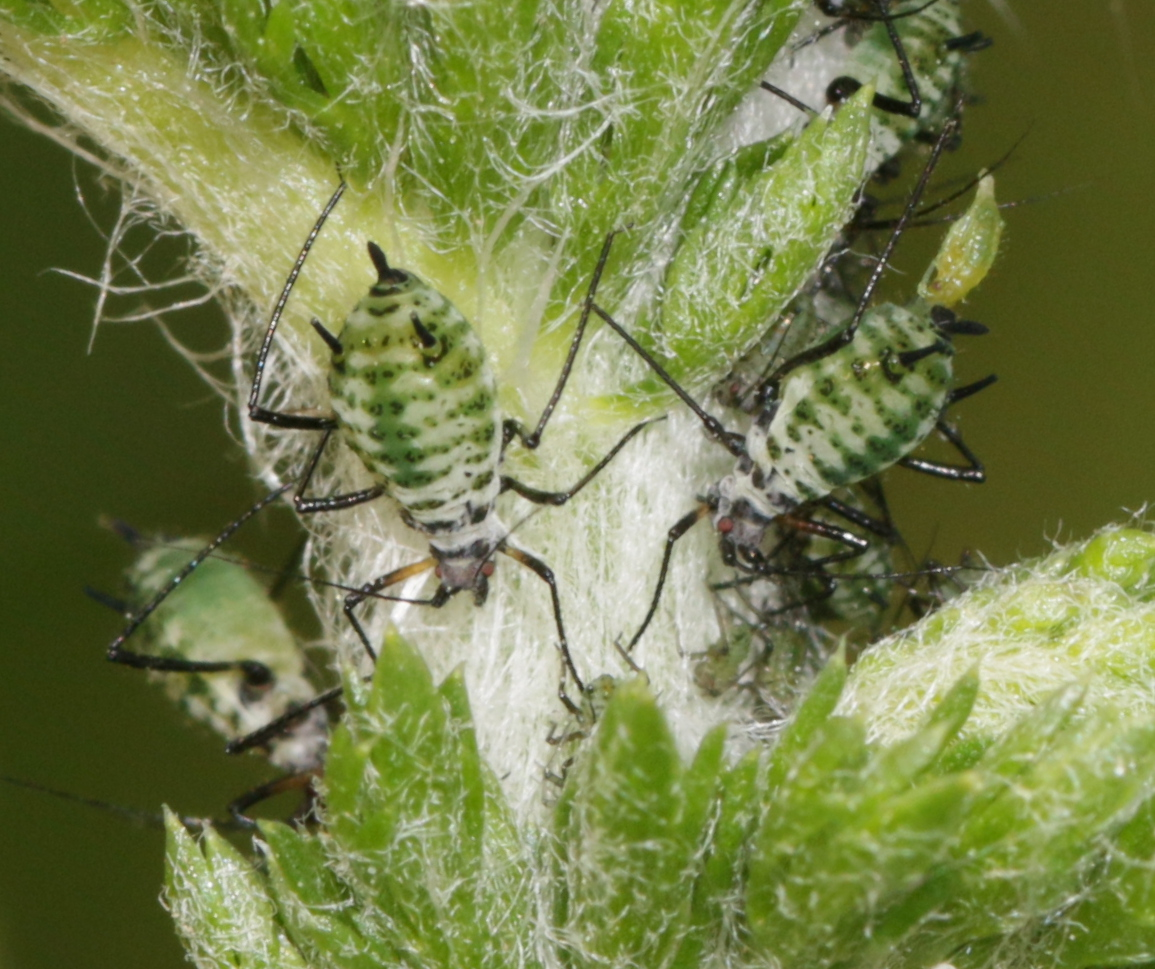

== Subspecies ==
These two subspecies belong to the species Macrosiphoniella millefolii:

- Macrosiphoniella millefolii millefolii (De Geer, 1773)^{c g}
- Macrosiphoniella millefolii orientalis Pashtshenko, 1998^{c g}

Data sources: i = ITIS, c = Catalogue of Life, g = GBIF, b = Bugguide.net
