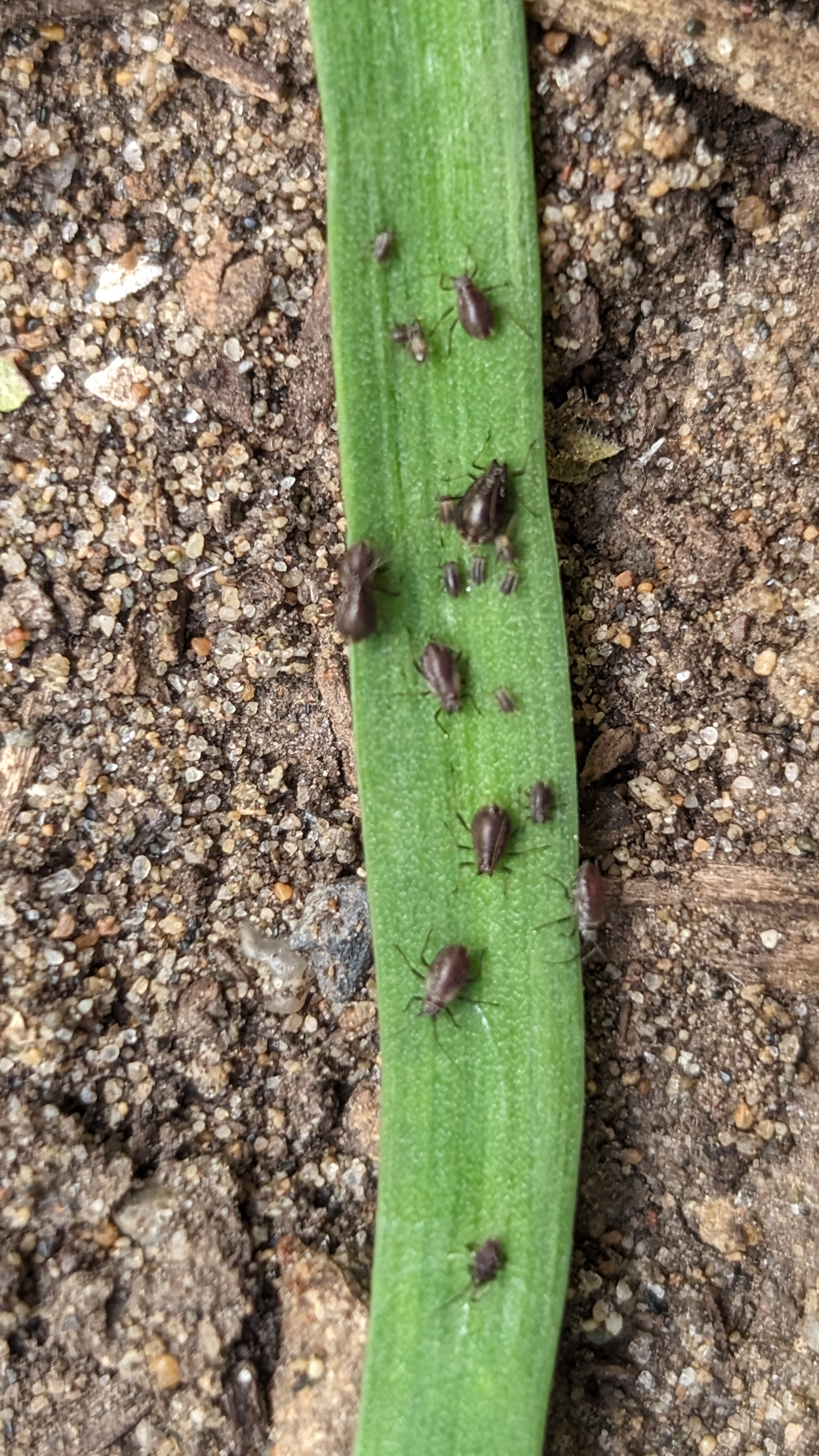

Scientific classification
- Domain: Eukaryota
- Kingdom: Animalia
- Phylum: Arthropoda
- Class: Insecta
- Order: Hemiptera
- Suborder: Sternorrhyncha
- Family: Aphididae
- Genus: Neotoxoptera
- Species: N. formosana

Binomial name
- Neotoxoptera formosana Takahashi, 1921

Synonyms
- Micromyzus alliumcepa Essig, 1935; * Micromyzus fuscus Richards, 1956

= Neotoxoptera formosana =

Species of true bug

Neotoxoptera formosana, the onion aphid, is an aphid in the order Hemiptera. It was originally discovered in Taiwan in 1921, but has spread all around the world. The aphid is dark reddish brown in color. Host plants include Allium ascalonicum, Allium cepa, Allium chinense, Allium fistulosum, Allium porrum, Allium sativum, Allium schoenoprasum, and Allium tuberosum.

The aphid is a carrier of garlic latent potyvirus and alstroemeria mosaic potyvirus.
