= Kaltenbachiella pallida =

Scientific classification
- Domain: Eukaryota
- Kingdom: Animalia
- Phylum: Arthropoda
- Class: Insecta
- Order: Hemiptera
- Suborder: Sternorrhyncha
- Family: Aphididae
- Subfamily: Eriosomatinae
- Genus: Kaltenbachiella
- Species: K. pallida

Binomial name
- Kaltenbachiella pallida (Haliday, 1838)

Species of true bug

Kaltenbachiella pallida is a species of true bug belonging to the family Aphididae.

It is native to Europe.
