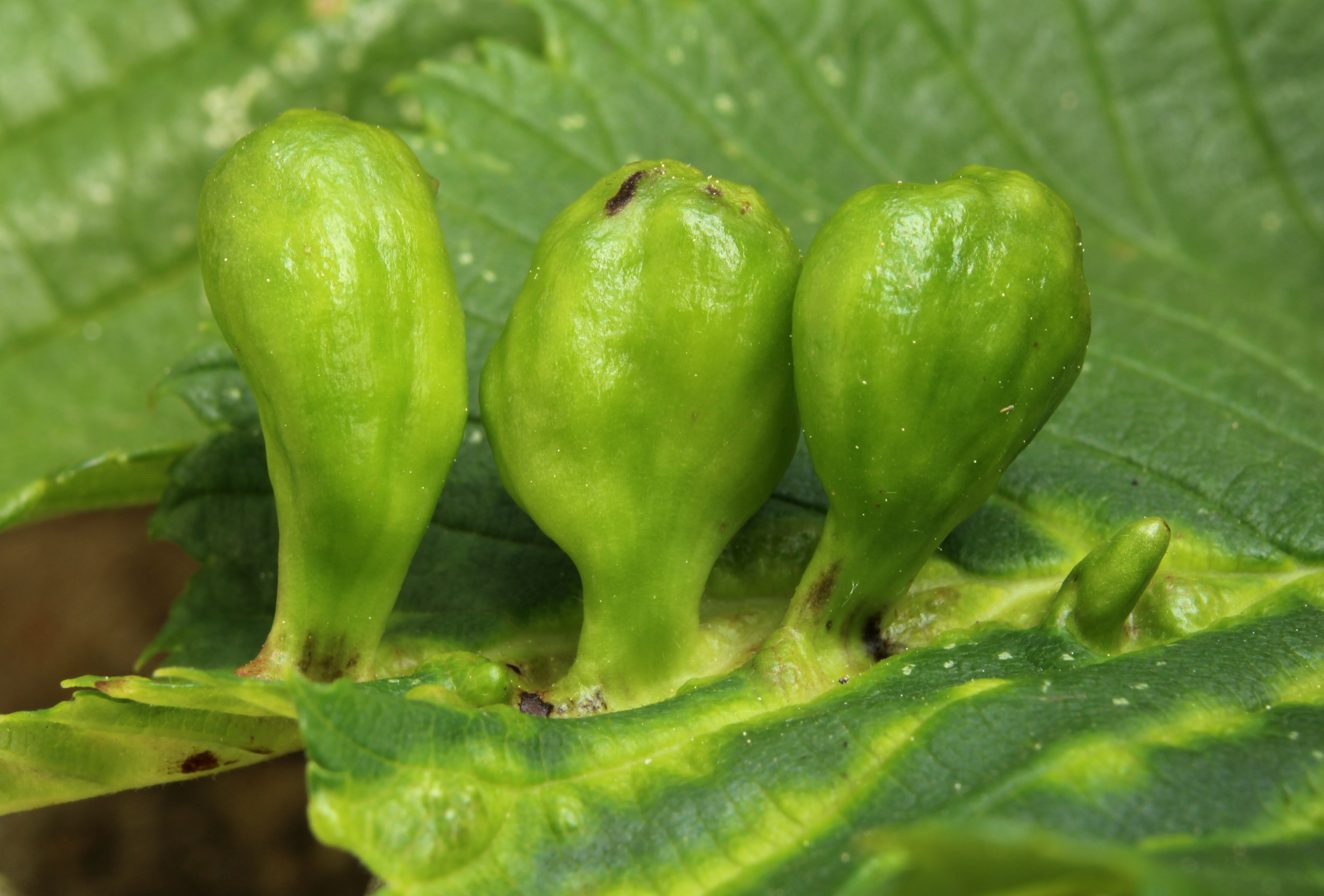
- Gall on an elm leaf

Scientific classification
- Kingdom: Animalia
- Phylum: Arthropoda
- Clade: Pancrustacea
- Class: Insecta
- Order: Hemiptera
- Suborder: Sternorrhyncha
- Family: Aphididae
- Genus: Tetraneura
- Species: T. ulmi

Binomial name
- Tetraneura ulmi (Linnaeus, 1758)

Synonyms
- Aphis ulmi Linnaeus, 1758

= Tetraneura ulmi =

Species of true bug

Tetraneura ulmi, the elm sack gall aphid and also known as a fig gall, is a species of aphid in the family Aphididae. It was described by Carl Linnaeus and named in his Systema Naturae, published in 1758. The aphid is found in Asia, Europe and North America, causing abnormal plant growths, known as galls on their primary host, elm trees (Ulmus species). They feed on a secondary host, the roots of various grasses.

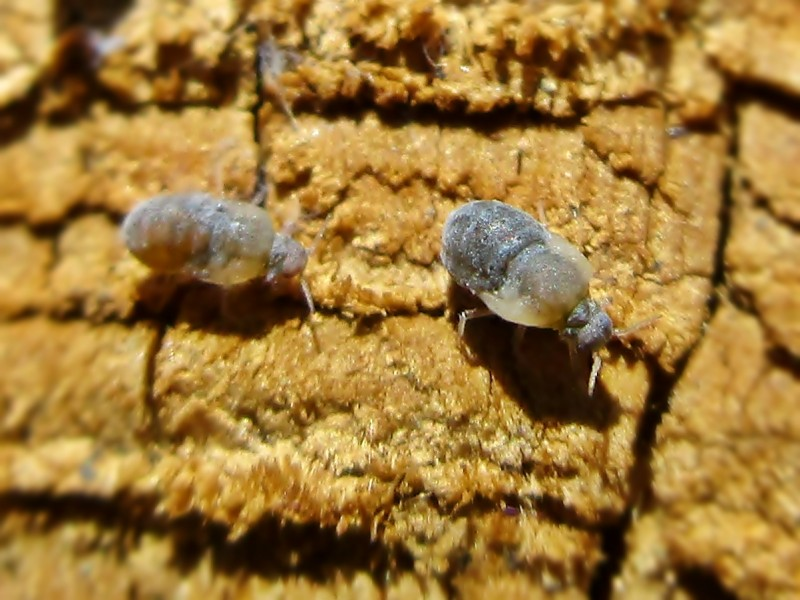
Elm sack gall aphid, Tetraneura ulmi

== Description ==
The gall is a stalked, club-like smooth pouch (7−15 mm high) on the leaves of elm trees. Feeding inside the gall is a nymph and some wax. Partly formed galls are pale yellow patches with irregular lumpy projections on the top surface of the leaf. On the underside of the leaf, young galls may have a hairy opening.

=== Life cycle ===
Mature asexual females leave the galls in the summer and lay eggs on grass roots. The aphids are pink, orange or purple, 2–3 mm long and covered in a thin layer of powdered wax. In the autumn, winged forms fly to elms and give birth to wingless mites of both sexes. After mating each female lays an egg and a female nymph hatches in the spring and starts feeding on the underside of a leaf. The leaf reacts by forming a tiny, yellowish pimple on the upper side, which is the early growth of a gall, into which the nymph enters, feeds and produce offspring.

Galls have been found on the following species, small-leaved elm (Ulmus minor) and wych elm (Ulmus glabra); rarely on American elm (Ulmus americana), David elm (Ulmus davidiana), European white elm (Ulmus laevis).
