= Megalocaria reichii =

Scientific classification
- Kingdom: Animalia
- Phylum: Arthropoda
- Clade: Pancrustacea
- Class: Insecta
- Order: Coleoptera
- Suborder: Polyphaga
- Infraorder: Cucujiformia
- Family: Coccinellidae
- Genus: Megalocaria
- Species: M. reichii

Binomial name
- Megalocaria reichii (Mulsant, 1850)

Synonyms
- Neda reichii Mulsant, 1850; Caria miranda Mulsant, 1866; Megalocaria pearsoni Crotch, 1874

Species of beetle

Megalocaria reichii is a species of beetle of the family Coccinellidae. It is found in India (Sikkim, West Bengal), Myanmar, China and Indonesia (Borneo, Java).

== Description ==
Adults reach a length of about 15–17 mm (0.59–0.67 in). The head is black and the pronotum is yellow with a black macula and black lateral margins. The scutellum is black and the elytra are orange-yellow with black margins, two basal maculae and three black spots in a row, as well as two spots in the apical third.

== Subspecies ==
- Megalocaria reichii reichii (Java)
- Megalocaria reichii pearsoni Crotch, 1874
