= Megalocaria rufitarsis =

Scientific classification
- Kingdom: Animalia
- Phylum: Arthropoda
- Clade: Pancrustacea
- Class: Insecta
- Order: Coleoptera
- Suborder: Polyphaga
- Infraorder: Cucujiformia
- Family: Coccinellidae
- Genus: Megalocaria
- Species: M. rufitarsis

Binomial name
- Megalocaria rufitarsis (Sicard, 1929)

Synonyms
- Caria rufitarsis Sicard, 1929

Species of beetle

Megalocaria rufitarsis is a species of beetle of the family Coccinellidae. It is found in Papua New Guinea.

== Description ==
Adults reach a length of about 12–14 mm (0.47–0.55 in). The frons is yellow in males, while females have small dark markings at the base. The antennae are yellow. The pronotum is black with pale markings along the lateral and anterior borders. The scutellum and elytra are black, the latter each with eight large orange-red spots.
