= Acyrthosiphon gossypii =

Scientific classification
- Domain: Eukaryota
- Kingdom: Animalia
- Phylum: Arthropoda
- Class: Insecta
- Order: Hemiptera
- Suborder: Sternorrhyncha
- Family: Aphididae
- Genus: Acyrthosiphon
- Species: A. gossypii

Binomial name
- Acyrthosiphon gossypii Mordvilko, 1914

Species of true bug

Acyrthosiphon gossypii, the melon aphid or cotton aphid, is an aphid in the superfamily Aphidoidea in the order Hemiptera. It is a true bug and sucks sap from plants. It is found from India, Sri Lanka, Cameroon, and South Africa.

== Host ==
Normally host in Sesbania grandiflora.

== Economic importance ==
It is known to be a major insect pest on cotton plants and melon fruits.
