= Macrosiphoniella yomogifoliae =

Scientific classification
- Domain: Eukaryota
- Kingdom: Animalia
- Phylum: Arthropoda
- Class: Insecta
- Order: Hemiptera
- Suborder: Sternorrhyncha
- Family: Aphididae
- Genus: Macrosiphoniella
- Species: M. yomogifoliae

Binomial name
- Macrosiphoniella yomogifoliae Shinji, 1922

Species of aphid

Macrosiphoniella yomogifoliae is a species of aphid.
