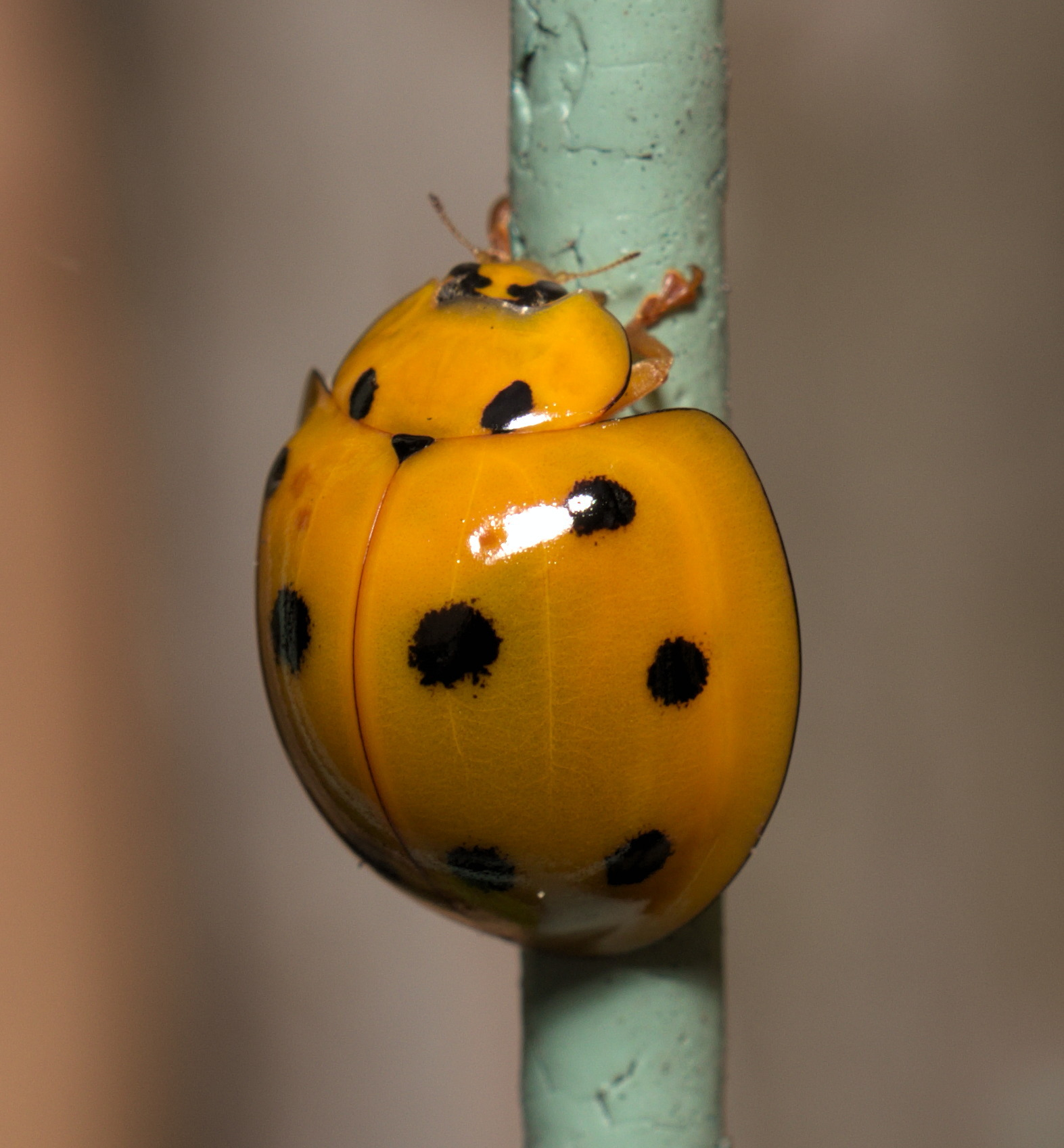
- Megalocaria dilatata, China

Scientific classification
- Kingdom: Animalia
- Phylum: Arthropoda
- Clade: Pancrustacea
- Class: Insecta
- Order: Coleoptera
- Suborder: Polyphaga
- Infraorder: Cucujiformia
- Family: Coccinellidae
- Subfamily: Coccinellinae
- Tribe: Coccinellini
- Genus: Megalocaria; Crotch, 1871

Synonyms
- Archaioneda Crotch, 1874; Caria Mulsant, 1850

= Megalocaria =

Genus of beetles

Megalocaria is a genus of ladybird beetles in the family Coccinellidae. There are at least three described species in Megalocaria, found in South and Southeast Asia.

== Species ==
These species belong to the genus Megalocaria:

- Megalocaria abbreviata
- Megalocaria alutacea
- Megalocaria anomala
- Megalocaria arrowi
- Megalocaria ceramensis
- Megalocaria dilatata (Fabricius, 1775)
- Megalocaria distaura
- Megalocaria faivrii
- Megalocaria formosa
- Megalocaria infirmata
- Megalocaria korschefskyi
- Megalocaria major
- Megalocaria obliterata
- Megalocaria reichii
- Megalocaria rufitarsis
- Megalocaria singularis
- Megalocaria tibialis
- Megalocaria tricolor (Fabricius, 1787)
- Megalocaria welwitschii

== Selected former species ==
- Megalocaria fijiensis (Crotch, 1874)
