= Macrosiphoniella sibirica =

Scientific classification
- Domain: Eukaryota
- Kingdom: Animalia
- Phylum: Arthropoda
- Class: Insecta
- Order: Hemiptera
- Suborder: Sternorrhyncha
- Family: Aphididae
- Genus: Macrosiphoniella
- Species: M. sibirica

Binomial name
- Macrosiphoniella sibirica Ivanovskaya, 1971

Species of true bug

Macrosiphoniella sibirica is an aphid found on stems and inflorescences of Artemisia (mugwort) in western Siberia and Kazakhstan. Named as a separate species by Ivanoskaya, it is very similar to M. artemisiae.

== Bibliography ==
- Bisby F.A.; Roskov Y.R.; Orrell T.M.; Nicolson D.; Paglinawan L.E.; Bailly N.; Kirk P.M.; Bourgoin T.; Baillargeon G.; Ouvrard D., eds. (2011). "Species 2000 & ITIS Catalogue of Life: 2011 Annual Checklist". Species 2000: Reading, UK.
- Remaudière, G. & M. Remaudière (1997), Catalogue of the World's Aphididae, INRA, Paris 473 pp.
- AphidSF: Aphid Species File. Favret C., 2010-04-14
