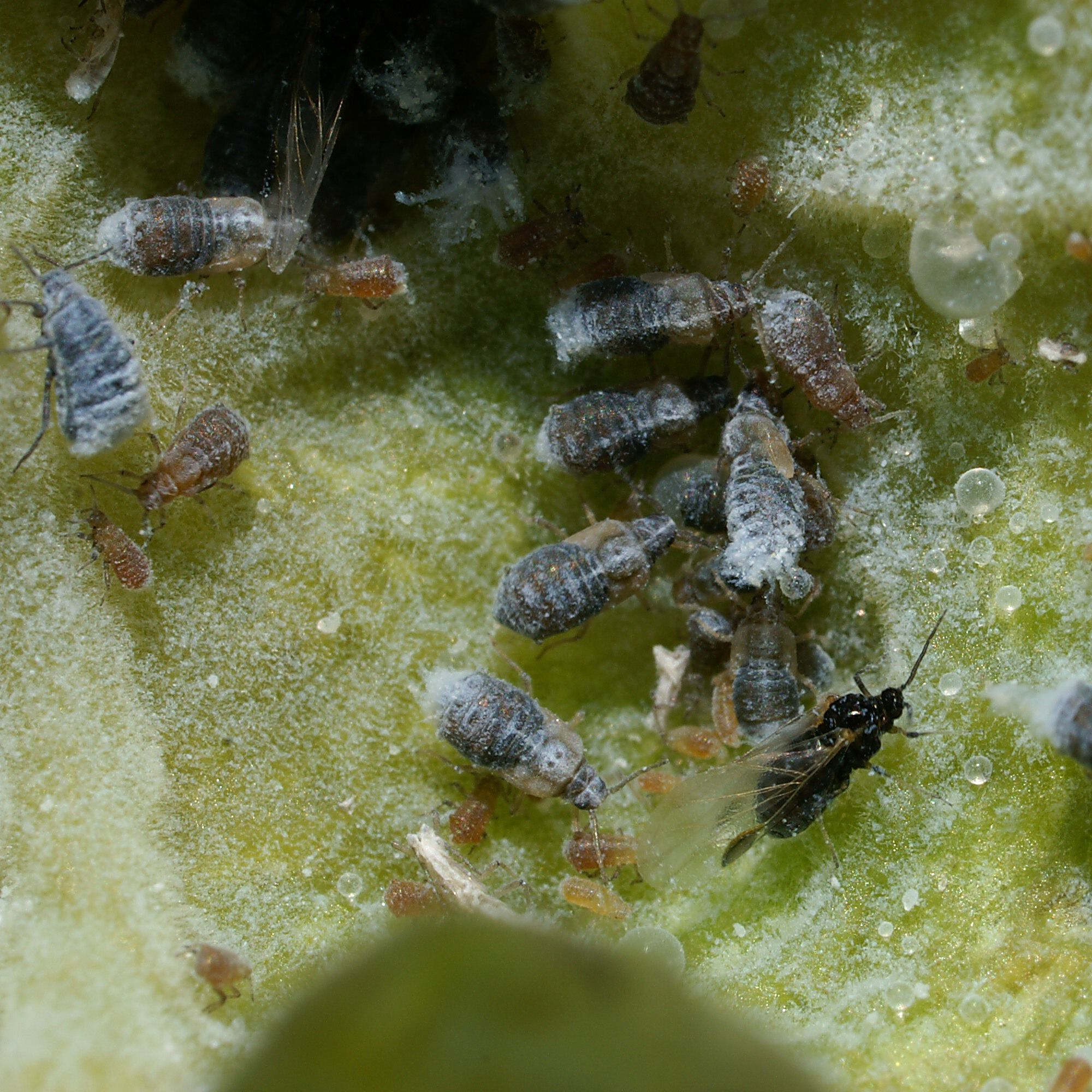
- Tetraneura ulmi

Scientific classification
- Kingdom: Animalia
- Phylum: Arthropoda
- Class: Insecta
- Order: Hemiptera
- Suborder: Sternorrhyncha
- Family: Aphididae
- Tribe: Eriosomatini
- Genus: Tetraneura; Hartig, 1841

= Tetraneura =

Genus of true bugs

Tetraneura is a genus of woolly and gall-making aphids in the family Aphididae. There are more than thirty described species in Tetraneura.

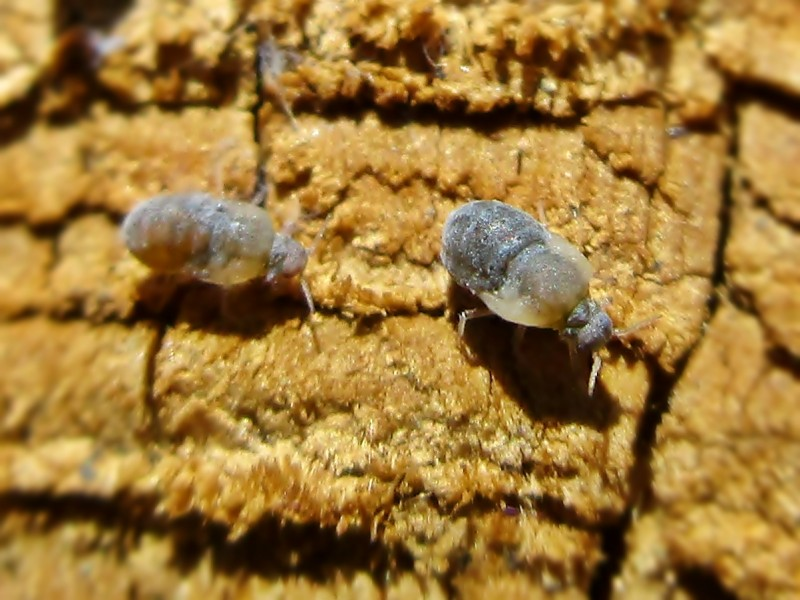
Tetraneura ulmi

== Species ==
These 38 species belong to the genus Tetraneura:

- Tetraneura aequiunguis Zhang, Guangxue & Wanyu Zhang, 1991^{c g}
- Tetraneura africana van der Goot, 1912^{c g}
- Tetraneura agnesii Del Guercio, 1921^{c g}
- Tetraneura akinire^{c g}
- Tetraneura asymmachia Zhang, Guangxue & Wanyu Zhang, 1991^{c g}
- Tetraneura basui Hille Ris Lambers, 1970^{c g}
- Tetraneura brachytricha Zhang, Guangxue & Wanyu Zhang, 1991^{c g}
- Tetraneura caerulescens^{c g}
- Tetraneura capitata Zhang, Guangxue & Wanyu Zhang, 1991^{c g}
- Tetraneura changaica^{c g}
- Tetraneura chinensis^{c g}
- Tetraneura chui Zhang, Guangxue & Wanyu Zhang, 1991^{c g}
- Tetraneura fusiformis^{c g}
- Tetraneura gallarumulmi De Geer, 1773^{g}
- Tetraneura indica^{c g}
- Tetraneura iriensis^{c g}
- Tetraneura javensis van der Goot, 1917^{c}
- Tetraneura kalimpongensis Raychaudhuri, D.N., Pal & M.R. Ghosh, 1978^{c g}
- Tetraneura lambersi Chakrabarti, Samiran & Maity, 1978^{c g}
- Tetraneura longisetosa^{c g}
- Tetraneura multisetosa Raychaudhuri, D.N., Pal & M.R. Ghosh, 1978^{c g}
- Tetraneura ovaliformis Watanabe, Sano & Akimoto, 2022^{c g}
- Tetraneura paiki Hille Ris Lambers, 1970^{c g}
- Tetraneura persicina Zhang, Guangxue & Wanyu Zhang, 1991^{c g}
- Tetraneura polychaeta Hille Ris Lambers, 1970^{c g}
- Tetraneura polychorema Zhang, Guangxue, 1997^{c g}
- Tetraneura pumilae^{c g}
- Tetraneura radicicola^{c g}
- Tetraneura reticulata Del Guercio, 1921^{c g}
- Tetraneura sikkimensis Raychaudhuri, D.N., Pal & M.R. Ghosh, 1978^{c g}
- Tetraneura sorini Hille Ris Lambers, 1970^{c g}
- Tetraneura triangula Zhang, Guangxue & Wanyu Zhang, 1991^{c g}
- Tetraneura ulmi (Linnaeus, 1758)^{c g b} (elm sack gall aphid)
- Tetraneura ulmicema Zhang, Guangxue, 1997^{c g}
- Tetraneura ulmoides^{c g}
- Tetraneura utpali Chakrabarti, Samiran, Maity & D.K. Bhattacharya, 1^{c g}
- Tetraneura walshii Williams, 1911^{g}
- Tetraneura yezoensis^{c g}

Data sources: i = ITIS, c = Catalogue of Life, g = GBIF, b = Bugguide.net
