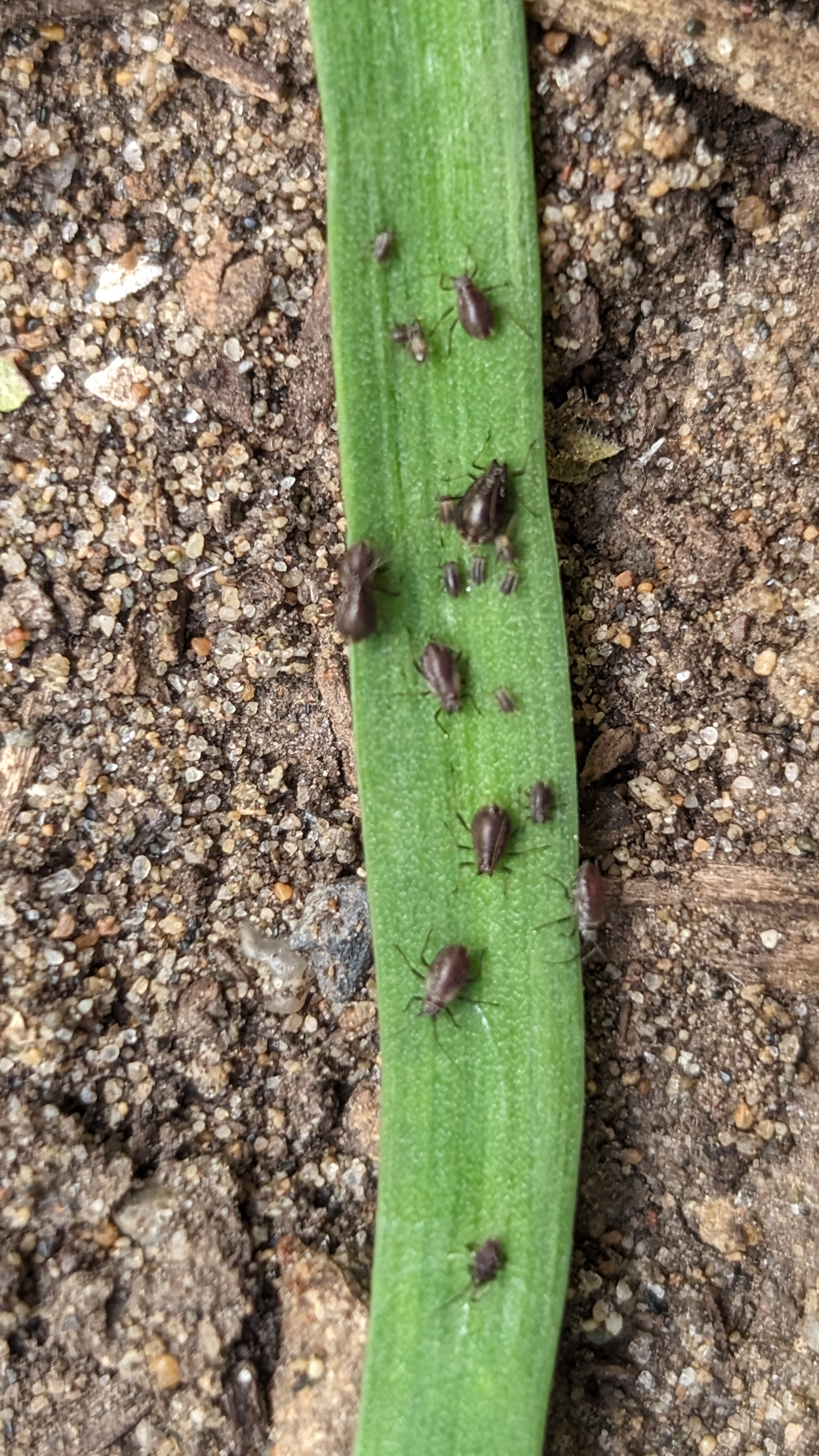
- Neotoxoptera formosana

Scientific classification
- Domain: Eukaryota
- Kingdom: Animalia
- Phylum: Arthropoda
- Class: Insecta
- Order: Hemiptera
- Suborder: Sternorrhyncha
- Family: Aphididae
- Subfamily: Aphidinae
- Tribe: Macrosiphini
- Genus: Neotoxoptera; Theobald, 1915

Type species
- Neotoxoptera violae Theobald, 1915

= Neotoxoptera =

Genus of true bugs

Neotoxoptera is a genus of aphid in the order Hemiptera. It is a true bug and sucks sap from plants.

== Species ==
- Neotoxoptera abeliae Takahashi, 1965
- Neotoxoptera formosana (Takahashi, 1921)
- Neotoxoptera oliveri (Essig, 1935)
- Neotoxoptera sungkangensis
- Neotoxoptera violae (Pergande, 1900)
- Neotoxoptera weigeliae
- Neotoxoptera yasumatsui Sorin, 1971
