= Megalocaria tricolor =

Scientific classification
- Kingdom: Animalia
- Phylum: Arthropoda
- Clade: Pancrustacea
- Class: Insecta
- Order: Coleoptera
- Suborder: Polyphaga
- Infraorder: Cucujiformia
- Family: Coccinellidae
- Genus: Megalocaria
- Species: M. tricolor

Binomial name
- Megalocaria tricolor (Fabricius, 1787)

Synonyms
- Coccinella tricolor Fabricius, 1787; Archaioneda tricolor var. fijiensis Crotch, 1874

Species of beetle

Megalocaria tricolor is a species of beetle of the family Coccinellidae. It is found in Tonga, Samoa, Fiji and on Wallis.

== Description ==
Adults reach a length of about 7–9.5 mm (0.28–0.37 in). The head and antennae are yellow and the pronotum is yellow, with the base and most of the lateral margins black. The elytra are yellow with black and reddish markings, and with the basal border and suture black. In some specimens, the elytra are yellow with a black basal border and suture.
