= Megalocaria singularis =

Scientific classification
- Kingdom: Animalia
- Phylum: Arthropoda
- Clade: Pancrustacea
- Class: Insecta
- Order: Coleoptera
- Suborder: Polyphaga
- Infraorder: Cucujiformia
- Family: Coccinellidae
- Genus: Megalocaria
- Species: M. singularis

Binomial name
- Megalocaria singularis (Weise, 1902)

Synonyms
- Caria singularis Weise, 1902

Species of beetle

Megalocaria singularis is a species of beetle of the family Coccinellidae. It is found in Indonesia (Western New Guinea) and Papua New Guinea.

== Description ==
Adults reach a length of about 11–15 mm (0.43–0.59 in). The frons is yellow in males, while females have large black marks in the central area. The antennae are yellow. The pronotum is a black with a large pale area and a black lateral border. The scutellum and elytra are black, the latter with transverse pale stripes connected by large orange-red fascia.
