= Astegopteryx formosana =

Scientific classification
- Kingdom: Animalia
- Phylum: Arthropoda
- Class: Insecta
- Order: Hemiptera
- Suborder: Sternorrhyncha
- Family: Aphididae
- Genus: Astegopteryx
- Species: A. formosana

Binomial name
- Astegopteryx formosana (Takahashi, 1924)

Synonyms
- Cerataphis insularis van der Goot, 1912 – synonym of Oregma bambusae Buckton, 1893; Oregma insularis van der Goot, 1917; Oregma formosana Takahashi, 1924; Astegopteryx insularis (Takahashi, 1924); Oregma mysorensis Theobald, 1929; Astegopteryx unimaculata Noordam, 1991

Species of true bug

Astegopteryx formosana is an aphid in the subfamily Hormaphidinae. It is found in Asia (Taiwan, China, Java, India). It is a sap-sucking pest of bamboos.
