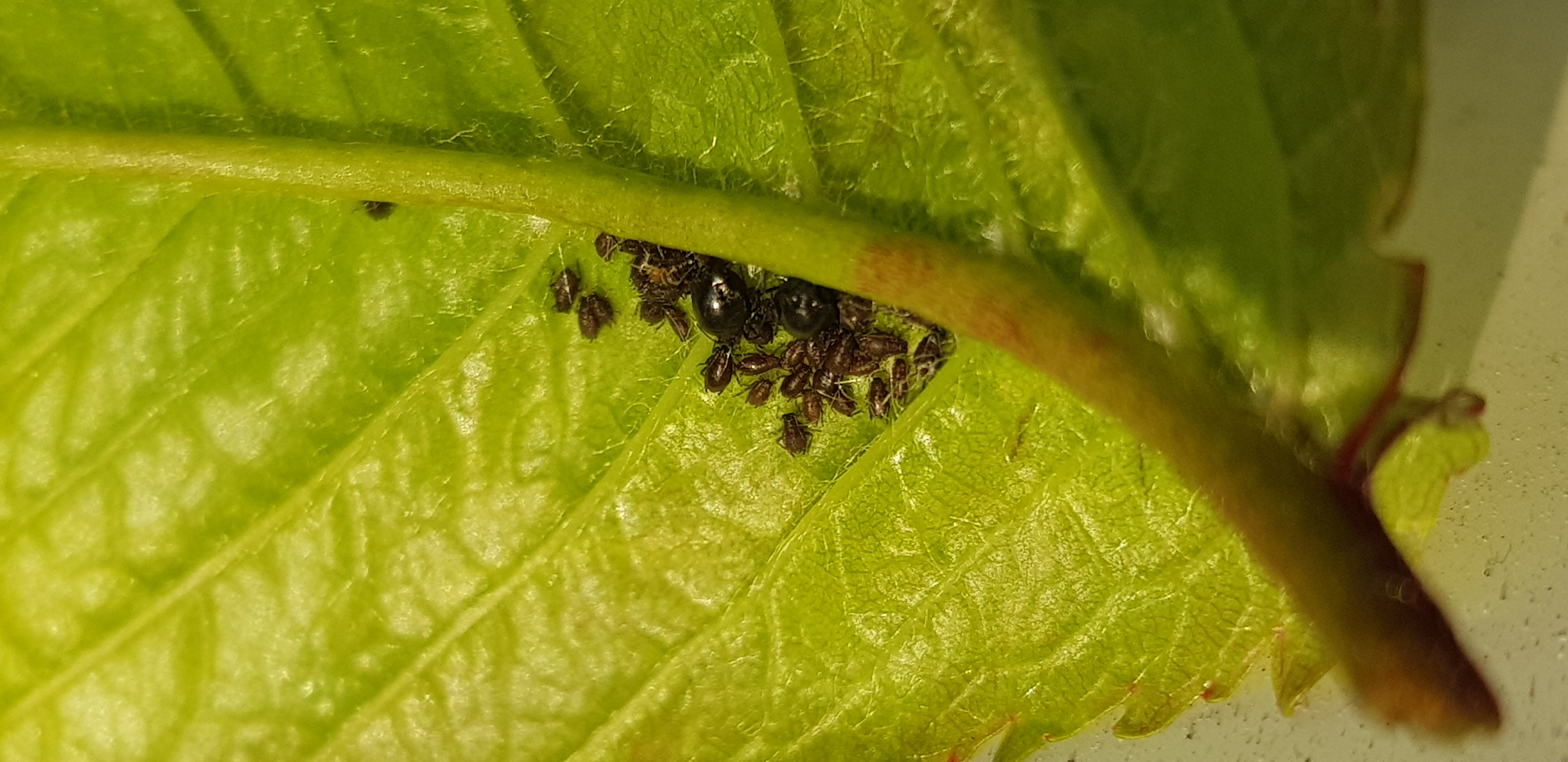
- Colony of Myzus cerasi on a cherry leaf

Scientific classification
- Kingdom: Animalia
- Phylum: Arthropoda
- Class: Insecta
- Order: Hemiptera
- Suborder: Sternorrhyncha
- Family: Aphididae
- Genus: Myzus
- Species: M. cerasi

Binomial name
- Myzus cerasi (Fabricius, 1775)

Synonyms
- See below

= Myzus cerasi =

Species of true bug

Myzus cerasi, the black cherry aphid or cherry blackfly, is an aphid in order Hemiptera. It is a true bug and sucks sap from plants.

Morphology:

"Myzus cerasi is a small to medium-sized aphid. Adults are shiny, very dark brown to black, with a sclerotized dorsum. Siphunculi and cauda are entirely black. The legs and antennae are yellow and black. Apterous summer virginoparae have a shiny black body, siphunculi and antennae. Cauda dusky to black, and tibiae yellow except tips.

Ecology:

The Myzus cerasi breeding habitat is found at growing top shoots of Prunus spp., Prunus cerasus and Prunus avium. Forming large colonies that cause leaf curling and damage to newly forming leaves. Myzus cerasi is also considered to be a cosmopolitan species, ranging across Europe and parts of Asia. The species wide range and differing host species allows for breeding programs to make use of possible natural deterrents that may be more effective than previous pesticides. While research has shown correlation to damage caused by cherry aphids and half-line hosts, there is also evidence for host population resistance.

Biopesticides:

Bacillus thuringiensis and Bacillus thuringiensis, where found effective in both lab and field studies at reducing aphid population size. While environmental conditions reduce effectiveness of biopesticides this can be attributed to aphid populations experiencing reduced exposure to FDP-41. While only 10 ng/μL of FDP-41 is needed to reach 70% mortality rate within 72 hours, under lab conditions, further studies are needed to increase the viability

== Host plants ==
It is known to live on both wild and domesticated cherry varieties.

== Synonyms ==
- Aphis aparines Kaltenbach, 1843
- Aphis asperulae Walker, 1848
- Aphis cerasi Müller, 1776
- Aphis cerasi Fabricius, 1775
- Aphis euphrasiae Walker, 1849
- Aphis molluginis Koch, 1854
- Aphis veronicae Walker, 1848
- Myzoides cerasi van der Goot, 1913
- Myzoides cerasi Fabricius
- Myzus alectorolophi Heinze, 1961
- Myzus asperulae Walker, 1848
- Myzus callange Essig, 1954
- Myzus galiifolium Theobald, 1929
- Myzus langei Essig, 1936
- Myzus pruniavium Börner, 1926
- Myzus quasipyrinus Theobald, 1929
