= Myzus boehmeriae =

Scientific classification
- Domain: Eukaryota
- Kingdom: Animalia
- Phylum: Arthropoda
- Class: Insecta
- Order: Hemiptera
- Suborder: Sternorrhyncha
- Family: Aphididae
- Genus: Myzus
- Species: M. boehmeriae

Binomial name
- Myzus boehmeriae Takahashi, 1923

Species of true bug

Myzus boehmeriae, also known as Myzus (Myzus) boehmeriae, is an aphid in the order Hemiptera. It is a true bug and sucks sap from plants.
