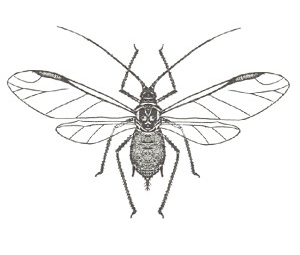

Scientific classification
- Domain: Eukaryota
- Kingdom: Animalia
- Phylum: Arthropoda
- Class: Insecta
- Order: Hemiptera
- Suborder: Sternorrhyncha
- Family: Aphididae
- Genus: Macrosiphoniella
- Species: M. sanborni

Binomial name
- Macrosiphoniella sanborni (Gillette, 1908)

= Macrosiphoniella sanborni =

Species of true bug

Macrosiphoniella sanborni, the chrysanthemum aphid, is an aphid in the superfamily Aphidoidea in the order Hemiptera. It is a true bug and sucks sap from plants.

== Host plants ==
This species of aphid is only known to live on Chrysanthemum species.
