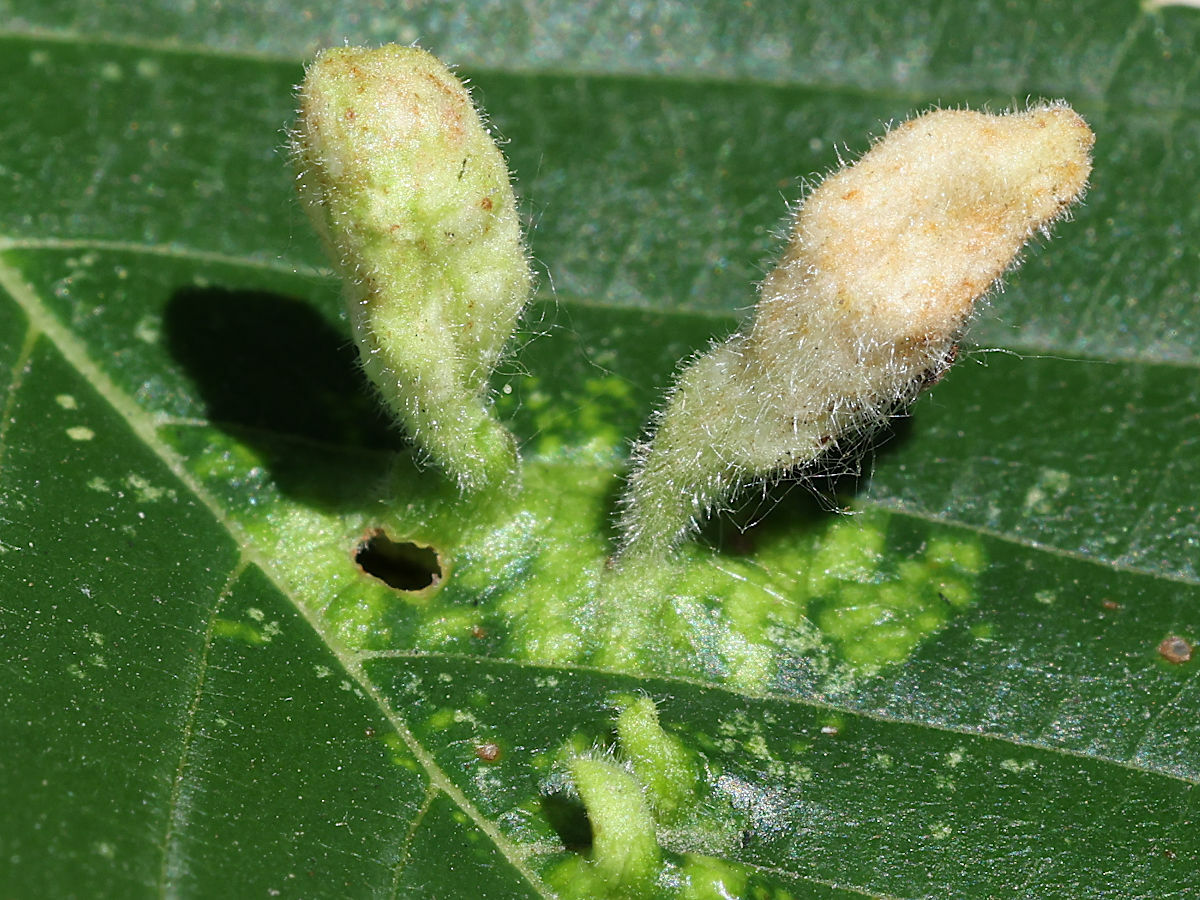
- galls on elm leaf

Scientific classification
- Kingdom: Animalia
- Phylum: Arthropoda
- Clade: Pancrustacea
- Class: Insecta
- Order: Hemiptera
- Suborder: Sternorrhyncha
- Family: Aphididae
- Genus: Tetraneura
- Species: T. akinire

Binomial name
- Tetraneura akinire Sasaki, 1904

Synonyms
- Tetraneura argrimoniae; Tetraneura graminiradicis (Zhang, 1992); Tetraneura hirsuta (Baker, 1921); Tetraneura oryzae; Tetraneurella nigriabdominalis; Tetraneura nigriabdominalis (Sasaki, 1899)

= Tetraneura akinire =

Rice Root Aphid

Species of true bug

The oriental grass root aphid (or rice root aphid), Tetraneura akinire, is an aphid in the superfamily Aphidoidea in the order Hemiptera. It is a true bug and sucks sap from plants.

== Ecology ==
Hosts alternate between elm leaves and roots of grasses and cereals. The fundatrix (founding or stem mother) lays eggs in a leaf of the primary host, which are trees in the genus Ulmus. This stimulates production of galls where offspring of the fundatrix develop by feeding on host sap. These mature into winged adult alates, which complete the life cycle on the secondary host.

The species is thought to have originated in Asia, but now has spread to southern and south-east Europe and the United States.
