= Micromyzus nigrum =

Scientific classification
- Kingdom: Animalia
- Phylum: Arthropoda
- Clade: Pancrustacea
- Class: Insecta
- Order: Hemiptera
- Suborder: Sternorrhyncha
- Family: Aphididae
- Genus: Micromyzus
- Species: M. nigrum

Binomial name
- Micromyzus nigrum van der Goot, 1917

Species of true bug

Micromyzus nigrum is an aphid in the superfamily Aphidoidea in the order Hemiptera. It is a true bug and sucks sap from plants.
