= Toxoptera odinae =

Scientific classification
- Kingdom: Animalia
- Phylum: Arthropoda
- Clade: Pancrustacea
- Class: Insecta
- Order: Hemiptera
- Suborder: Sternorrhyncha
- Family: Aphididae
- Genus: Toxoptera
- Species: T. odinae

Binomial name
- Toxoptera odinae (van der Goot, 1917)

Species of true bug

Toxoptera odinae, the mango aphid, is a species of aphid in the superfamily Aphidoidea in the order Hemiptera. It is a true bug and feeds by sucking sap from plants.
