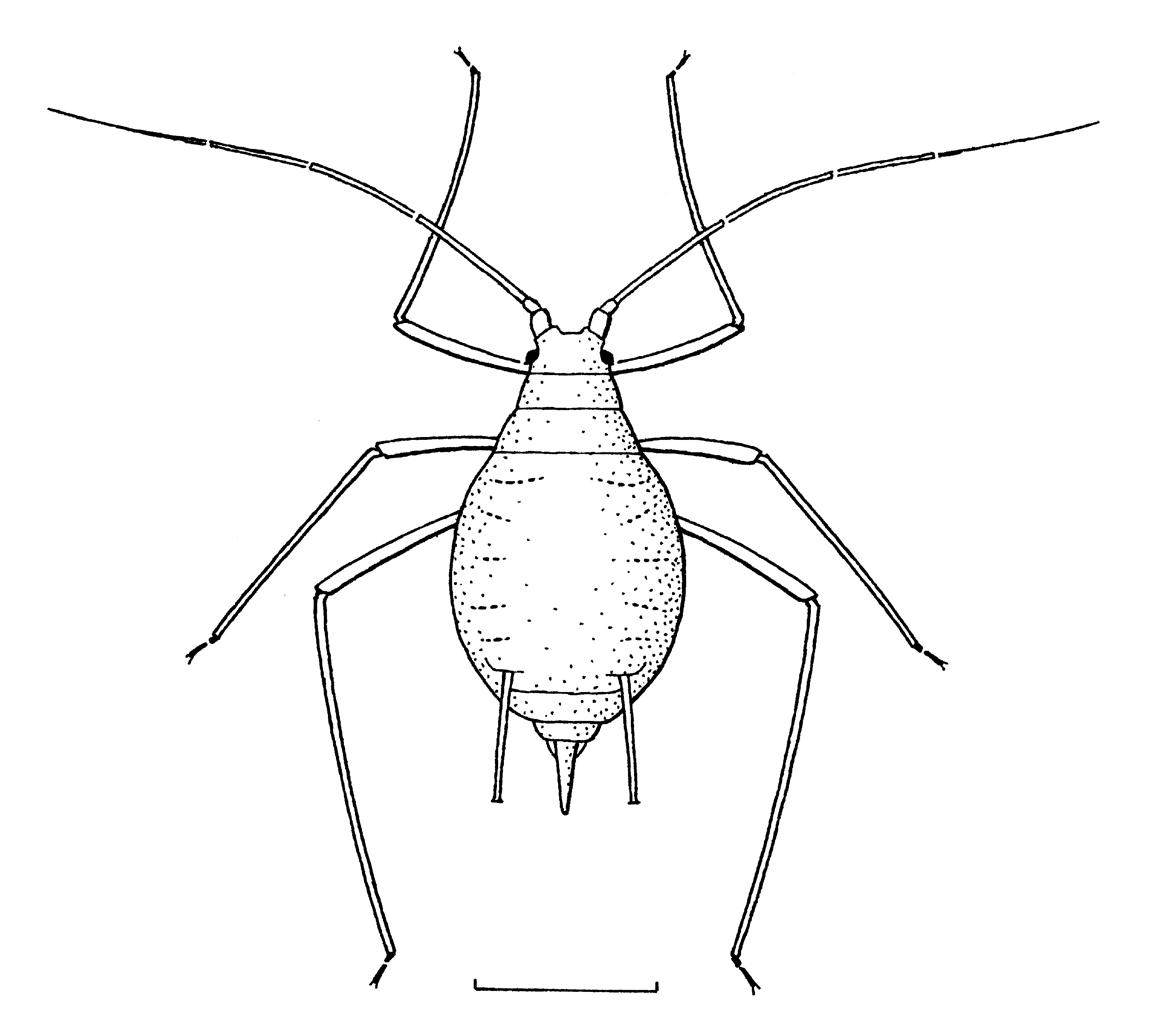

Scientific classification
- Kingdom: Animalia
- Phylum: Arthropoda
- Clade: Pancrustacea
- Class: Insecta
- Order: Hemiptera
- Suborder: Sternorrhyncha
- Family: Aphididae
- Genus: Acyrthosiphon
- Species: A. kondoi

Binomial name
- Acyrthosiphon kondoi Shinji. 1938

= Acyrthosiphon kondoi =

Species of true bug

Acyrthosiphon kondoi, the blue alfalfa aphid or bluegreen aphid, is an aphid in the superfamily Aphidoidea in the order Hemiptera. It is a true bug and sucks sap from leguminous plants, particularly alfalfa (known as lucerne in most countries outside North America).

It was first described in 1938 by Orihei Shinji and Kondo from specimens collected in China (Manchoukuo).

== Description ==
The blue alfalfa aphid grows to a length of 3 to 3.5 mm (0.12 to 0.14 in). It is very similar in appearance to the closely related pea aphid (Acyrthosiphon pisum), but is often a more bluish shade of green. One significant difference from the pea aphid is that the blue alfalfa aphid has uniformly dark-coloured antennae. Both wingless and winged female forms occur, with the winged aphids being able to disperse and colonise new plants. Males also sometimes occur, are smaller than females, and are green with brown markings on head, thorax and abdomen.

== Distribution ==
A native of Asia, the species has spread to other parts of the world including North America, South America, Australia and New Zealand; it was first detected in the United States in California in 1974 and had spread to Nebraska by 1979, Georgia and Kentucky by 1983 and Maryland by 1992. It is mainly a pest of plants in the family Leguminosae including alfalfa, pea, lentil and cowpea. Its host range in North America is very similar to that of the pea aphid, however, it is seen earlier in the spring and is more tolerant of cool weather than the pea aphid. As populations build up, they are increasingly affected by entomopathogenic fungi and parasitoids, with populations peaking and stabilising. Hot summer weather, with temperatures averaging above 80.8 °F (27.1 °C), favours the plants' natural resistance mechanisms, and numbers of aphids reduce sharply.

== Ecology ==
There are both winged and wingless adult females and both can produce live young by viviparity although some females also produce batches of eggs. Wingless forms are prolific and may have twelve or more generations in a season, producing young at the rate of seven nymphs per day. Winged forms produce many fewer young. These aphids may overwinter as eggs or as females, the latter moving from annual plants onto perennial legumes in the fall.

== Economic importance ==
This aphid is a major pest of dwarf beans and clover, where it feeds on leaves and stems. Where infection rates are high, yellowing, twisting, stunting and leaf drop may occur, young seedlings may die and plants regrowing after cutting are severely affected. This aphid does more damage to lucerne crops than does pea aphid, and yields of the crop may be severely reduced even at low population densities, particularly in spring and autumn. Further damage may also occur to the plants as a result of the accumulation of honeydew and the sooty mould that grows on it, and the aphid can be a vector of alfalfa mosaic virus, lucerne transient streak virus and lucerne Australian latent virus in lucerne, as well as cucumber mosaic virus, bean yellow mosaic virus and watermelon mosaic virus in other crops.
