= Astegopteryx minuta =

Scientific classification
- Kingdom: Animalia
- Phylum: Arthropoda
- Clade: Pancrustacea
- Class: Insecta
- Order: Hemiptera
- Suborder: Sternorrhyncha
- Family: Aphididae
- Genus: Astegopteryx
- Species: A. minuta

Binomial name
- Astegopteryx minuta (van der Goot, 1917)

Synonyms
- Oregma minuta van der Goot, 1917; Trichoregma minuta (van der Goot, 1917)

Species of true bug

Astegopteryx minuta is a horned aphid in the subfamily Hormaphidinae. It was described from Java and also occurs in India. The larvae feed on bamboo leaves where they form sparse colonies. In securing their feeding sites, individual aphids engage in aggressive contests.
