= Akkaia taiwana =

Scientific classification
- Kingdom: Animalia
- Phylum: Arthropoda
- Clade: Pancrustacea
- Class: Insecta
- Order: Hemiptera
- Suborder: Sternorrhyncha
- Family: Aphididae
- Genus: Akkaia
- Species: A. taiwana

Binomial name
- Akkaia taiwana Takahashi, 1933

Synonyms
- Akkaia kagoshimana Tseng & Tao, 1938

Species of true bug

Akkaia taiwana is an aphid in the order Hemiptera. It is a true bug and sucks sap from plants.
