= Micromyzella judenkoi =

Scientific classification
- Domain: Eukaryota
- Kingdom: Animalia
- Phylum: Arthropoda
- Class: Insecta
- Order: Hemiptera
- Suborder: Sternorrhyncha
- Family: Aphididae
- Genus: Micromyzella
- Species: M. judenkoi

Binomial name
- Micromyzella judenkoi (Carver, 1965)

Synonyms
- Micromyzus judenkoi Carver, 1965

Species of true bug

Micromyzella judenkoi is an aphid in the order Hemiptera. It is a true bug and sucks sap from plants.
