= Neotoxoptera oliveri =

Scientific classification
- Domain: Eukaryota
- Kingdom: Animalia
- Phylum: Arthropoda
- Class: Insecta
- Order: Hemiptera
- Suborder: Sternorrhyncha
- Family: Aphididae
- Genus: Neotoxoptera
- Species: N. oliveri

Binomial name
- Neotoxoptera oliveri (Essig, 1935)

Synonyms
- Micromyzus oliveri Essig, 1935

Species of true bug

Neotoxoptera oliveri, the marigold aphid, is an aphid in the order Hemiptera. It is a true bug and sucks sap from plants.
