= Ceratoglyphina bambusae =

Scientific classification
- Kingdom: Animalia
- Phylum: Arthropoda
- Class: Insecta
- Order: Hemiptera
- Suborder: Sternorrhyncha
- Family: Aphididae
- Genus: Ceratoglyphina
- Species: C. bambusae

Binomial name
- Ceratoglyphina bambusae van der Goot, 1917

Species of true bug

Ceratoglyphina bambusae is an aphid in the subfamily Hormaphidinae. It occurs in tropical South-East Asia (the Malay Peninsula, Sulawesi, Java, Sumatra). Aoki and Kurosu (2010) argue that records from Taiwan represent Ceratoglyphina styracicola rather than this species. Nevertheless, the Catalogue of Life in Taiwan lists both as being present in Taiwan.

== Subspecies ==
Two subspecies are recognized:

- Ceratoglyphina bambusae bambusae van der Goot, 1917
- Ceratoglyphina bambusae deccanensis Das & Ghosh, 1999
