= Kaltenbachiella elsholtriae =

Scientific classification
- Domain: Eukaryota
- Kingdom: Animalia
- Phylum: Arthropoda
- Class: Insecta
- Order: Hemiptera
- Suborder: Sternorrhyncha
- Family: Aphididae
- Subfamily: Eriosomatinae
- Genus: Kaltenbachiella
- Species: K. elsholtriae

Binomial name
- Kaltenbachiella elsholtriae (Shinji, 1936)

Species of true bug

Kaltenbachiella elsholtriae, is an aphid in the superfamily Aphidoidea in the order Hemiptera. It is a true bug and sucks sap from plants.
