= Ipuka dispersum =

Scientific classification
- Kingdom: Animalia
- Phylum: Arthropoda
- Class: Insecta
- Order: Hemiptera
- Suborder: Sternorrhyncha
- Family: Aphididae
- Genus: Ipuka
- Species: I. dispersum

Binomial name
- Ipuka dispersum (van der Goot, 1917)

Species of true bug

Ipuka dispersum is an aphid in the order Hemiptera. It is a true bug and sucks sap from plants.
