= Myzus ascalonicus =

Scientific classification
- Kingdom: Animalia
- Phylum: Arthropoda
- Class: Insecta
- Order: Hemiptera
- Suborder: Sternorrhyncha
- Family: Aphididae
- Genus: Myzus
- Species: M. ascalonicus

Binomial name
- Myzus ascalonicus Doncaster, 1946

Synonyms
- Rhopalomyzus ascalonicus

Species of true bug

Myzus ascalonicus, the shallot aphid, is an aphid in the order Hemiptera. It is a true bug and sucks sap from plants.

== Economic importance ==
This aphid is known to attack many economically important plants such as cucumber, pumpkin, cabbage, broccoli, cauliflower, turnip, strawberry, Chrysanthemum, and Tulipa.
