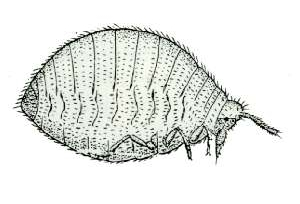

Scientific classification
- Domain: Eukaryota
- Kingdom: Animalia
- Phylum: Arthropoda
- Class: Insecta
- Order: Hemiptera
- Suborder: Sternorrhyncha
- Family: Aphididae
- Genus: Geoica
- Species: G. lucifuga

Binomial name
- Geoica lucifuga (Zehntner, 1897)

Synonyms
- Tetraneura lucifuga Zehntner, 1897; Tetraneura golbachi Blanchard, 1958; Tetraneura horvathi Nevsky, 1929; Tetraneura pseudosetulosa Theobald, 1928; Tetraneura spatulata Theobald, 1923; Tetraneura ferghanensis nomen nudum

= Geoica lucifuga =

Species of true bug

Geoica lucifuga, the sugarcane root aphid, is an aphid in the order Hemiptera. It is a true bug and sucks sap from plants.
