= Sinomegoura citricola =

Scientific classification
- Domain: Eukaryota
- Kingdom: Animalia
- Phylum: Arthropoda
- Class: Insecta
- Order: Hemiptera
- Suborder: Sternorrhyncha
- Family: Aphididae
- Genus: Sinomegoura
- Species: S. citricola

Binomial name
- Sinomegoura citricola (van der Goot, 1917)

Species of true bug

Sinomegoura citricola, is an aphid in the superfamily Aphidoidea in the order Hemiptera. It is a pest found on citruses and other ornamental plants.
