= Rhodobium porosum =

Yellow rose aphid

Scientific classification
- Kingdom: Animalia
- Phylum: Arthropoda
- Class: Insecta
- Order: Hemiptera
- Suborder: Sternorrhyncha
- Family: Aphididae
- Genus: Rhodobium
- Species: R. porosum

Binomial name
- Rhodobium porosum (Sanderson, 1900)

Species of true bug

Rhodobium porosum, the yellow rose aphid, is an aphid in the superfamily Aphidoidea in the order Hemiptera. It is a true bug that is found on strawberries and roses.
