= Tetraneura yezoensis =

Scientific classification
- Kingdom: Animalia
- Phylum: Arthropoda
- Clade: Pancrustacea
- Class: Insecta
- Order: Hemiptera
- Suborder: Sternorrhyncha
- Family: Aphididae
- Genus: Tetraneura
- Species: T. yezoensis

Binomial name
- Tetraneura yezoensis Matsumura, 1917

Synonyms
- Tetraneura heterohirsuta Carver & Basu, 1961

Species of true bug

Tetraneura yezoensis, also known as Tetraneura (Tetraneura) yezoensis, is an aphid in the superfamily Aphidoidea in the order Hemiptera. It is a true bug and sucks sap from plants.
