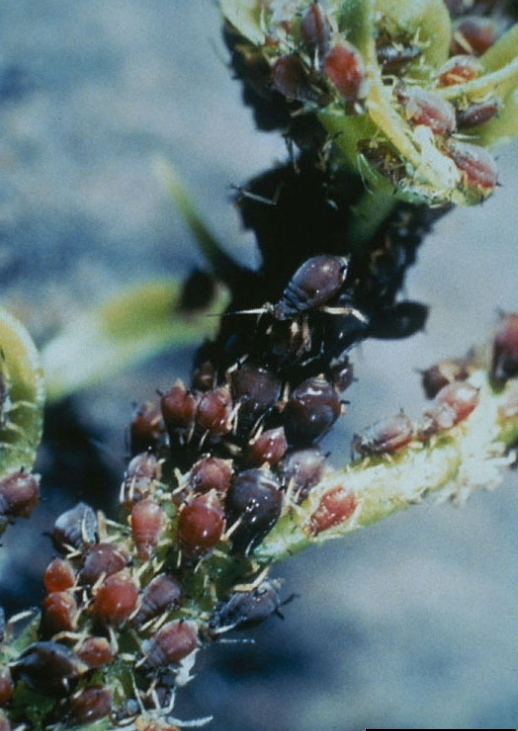

Scientific classification
- Domain: Eukaryota
- Kingdom: Animalia
- Phylum: Arthropoda
- Class: Insecta
- Order: Hemiptera
- Suborder: Sternorrhyncha
- Family: Aphididae
- Genus: Toxoptera
- Species: T. citricida

Binomial name
- Toxoptera citricida Kirkaldy, 1907

= Toxoptera citricida =

Species of true bug

Toxoptera citricida (syn. Toxoptera citricidus) is a species of aphid known by the common names brown citrus aphid, black citrus aphid, and oriental citrus aphid. It is a pest of citrus and vector for the pathogenic plant virus citrus tristeza virus. The aphid spread the virus through citrus groves in Brazil and Venezuela in the 1970s, leading to the near destruction of the citrus industry there. This aphid was first discovered in Florida in 1995.

The adult aphid is shiny black and wingless (aptera) or winged (alate or alatoid), and the nymph is dark reddish brown. The aphid feeds on new buds and leaves. The virus is transmitted when the aphid introduces it into the phloem of the plant.

In most parts of the world, there is no sexual reproductive stage in the autumn as there is in other aphid species and there are no males and no eggs. All the individuals are viviparous parthenogenetic females all year round. Populations increase very rapidly when the conditions are favourable. The nymphs mature in about a week at temperatures of 20 °C or higher. It has been calculated that a single aphid could produce over 4,400 offspring in three weeks in the absence of predation by natural enemies.
