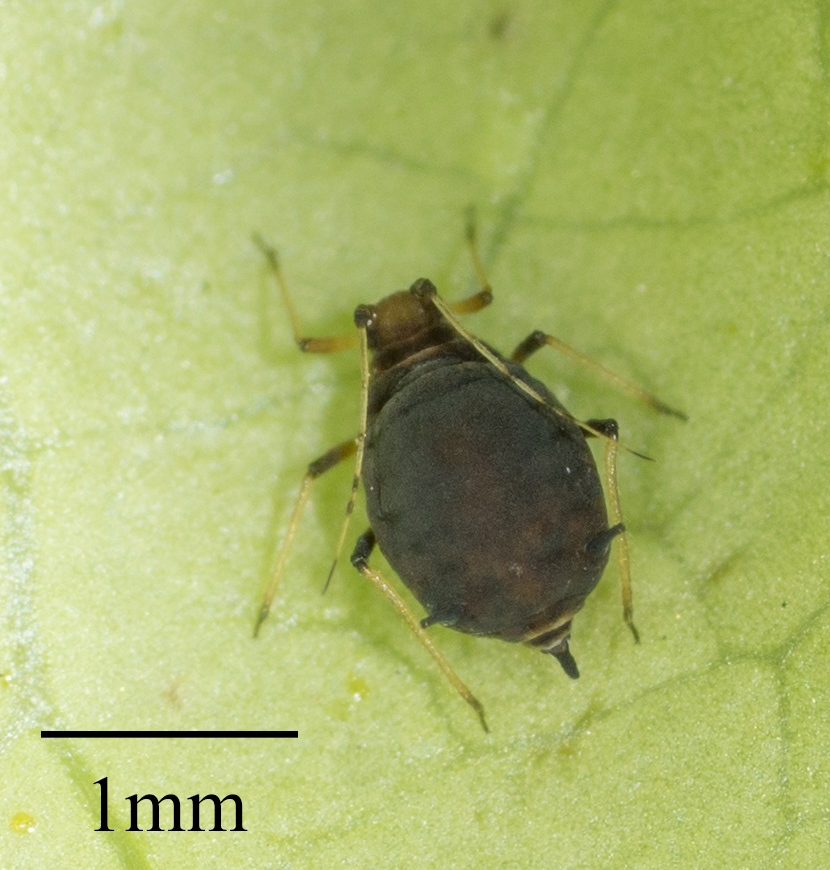

Scientific classification
- Domain: Eukaryota
- Kingdom: Animalia
- Phylum: Arthropoda
- Class: Insecta
- Order: Hemiptera
- Suborder: Sternorrhyncha
- Family: Aphididae
- Genus: Toxoptera
- Species: T. aurantii

Binomial name
- Toxoptera aurantii (Boyer de Fonscolombe)

Synonyms
- Toxoptera aurantiae; Aphis camelliae

= Toxoptera aurantii =

Species of true bug

Toxoptera aurantii, also known as both the black citrus aphid and brown citrus aphid, is a species of aphid in the superfamily Aphidoidea in the order Hemiptera. It is a true bug and sucks sap from plants. It is known to hosts in well over 150+ plant species.
