= Myzus obtusirostris =

Scientific classification
- Domain: Eukaryota
- Kingdom: Animalia
- Phylum: Arthropoda
- Class: Insecta
- Order: Hemiptera
- Suborder: Sternorrhyncha
- Family: Aphididae
- Genus: Myzus
- Species: M. obtusirostris

Binomial name
- Myzus obtusirostris David, Rajasingh & Narayanan, 1971

Species of true bug

Myzus obtusirostris, also known as Myzus (Myzus) obtusirostris, is an aphidin the order Hemiptera. It is a true bug and sucks sap from plants.
