= Vesiculaphis caricis =

Scientific classification
- Domain: Eukaryota
- Kingdom: Animalia
- Phylum: Arthropoda
- Class: Insecta
- Order: Hemiptera
- Suborder: Sternorrhyncha
- Family: Aphididae
- Genus: Vesiculaphis
- Species: V. caricis

Binomial name
- Vesiculaphis caricis (Fullaway, 1910)

Synonyms
- Vesiculaphis rhododendroni Fullaway, 1910; Vesiculaphis rhododenroni Fang, Huang & Qiao, 2008; Vesiculaphis shichito

Species of true bug

Vesiculaphis caricis is an aphid in the order Hemiptera. It is a true bug and sucks sap from plants.
