= Rhodobium (insect) =

Scientific classification
- Kingdom: Animalia
- Phylum: Arthropoda
- Class: Insecta
- Order: Hemiptera
- Suborder: Sternorrhyncha
- Family: Aphididae
- Genus: Rhodobium; Hille Ris Lambers, 1947

Genus of insects

Rhodobium is a genus of true bugs belonging to the family Aphididae.

The species of this genus are found in Europe, Central Asia and Northern America.

Species:

- Rhodobium porosum (Sanderson, 1900)
