= Schoutedenia lutea =

Scientific classification
- Kingdom: Animalia
- Phylum: Arthropoda
- Class: Insecta
- Order: Hemiptera
- Suborder: Sternorrhyncha
- Family: Aphididae
- Genus: Schoutedenia
- Species: S. lutea

Binomial name
- Schoutedenia lutea (van der Goot, 1917)

Synonyms
- Setaphis lutea van der Goot, 1917

Species of true bug

Schoutedenia lutea, is an aphid in the superfamily Aphidoidea in the order Hemiptera. It is a true bug and sucks sap from plants.
