= Greenideoida ceyloniae =

Scientific classification
- Domain: Eukaryota
- Kingdom: Animalia
- Phylum: Arthropoda
- Class: Insecta
- Order: Hemiptera
- Suborder: Sternorrhyncha
- Family: Aphididae
- Genus: Greenideoida
- Species: G. ceyloniae

Binomial name
- Greenideoida ceyloniae van der Goot, 1918

Synonyms
- Greenideoida mesuae Takahashi, 1950

Species of true bug

Greenideoida ceyloniae, also known as Greenideoida (Greenideoida) ceyloniae, is an aphid in the order Hemiptera. It is a true bug and sucks sap from plants.
