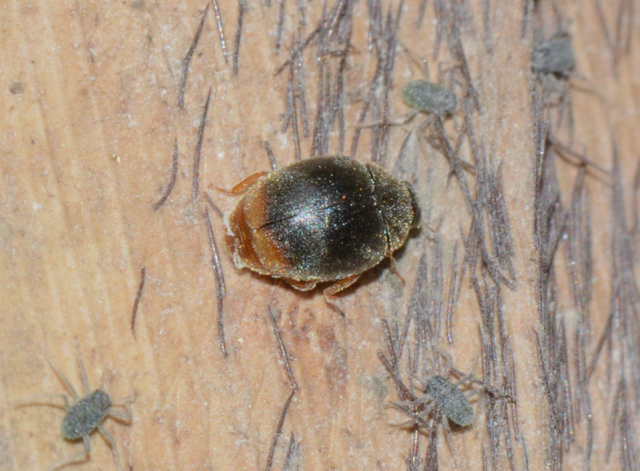
- A Scymnus beetle which preys on Pseudoregma bambucicola

Scientific classification
- Domain: Eukaryota
- Kingdom: Animalia
- Phylum: Arthropoda
- Class: Insecta
- Order: Hemiptera
- Suborder: Sternorrhyncha
- Family: Aphididae
- Genus: Pseudoregma
- Species: P. bambucicola

Binomial name
- Pseudoregma bambucicola (Takahashi, 1921)

Synonyms
- Pseudoregma albostriata; Pseudoregma bucktoni Ghosh, Pal & Raychaudhuri, 1977; Pseudoregma cantonensis; Pseudoregma swinhoei (Takahashi, 1936); Pseudoregma bambusicola Szelegiewicz, 1968

= Pseudoregma bambucicola =

Species of true bug

Pseudoregma bambucicola, the bamboo woolly aphid, is an aphid in the order Hemiptera. It is a true bug and sucks sap from plants.
