= Macrosiphoniella pseudoartemisiae =

Scientific classification
- Kingdom: Animalia
- Phylum: Arthropoda
- Class: Insecta
- Order: Hemiptera
- Suborder: Sternorrhyncha
- Family: Aphididae
- Genus: Macrosiphoniella
- Species: M. pseudoartemisiae

Binomial name
- Macrosiphoniella pseudoartemisiae Shinji, 1933

Species of true bug

Macrosiphoniella pseudoartemisiae, also known as Macrosiphoniella (Macrosiphoniella) pseudoartemisiae, is an aphid in the superfamily Aphidoidea in the order Hemiptera. It is a true bug and sucks sap from plants. The species was first described by Shinji in 1933.
