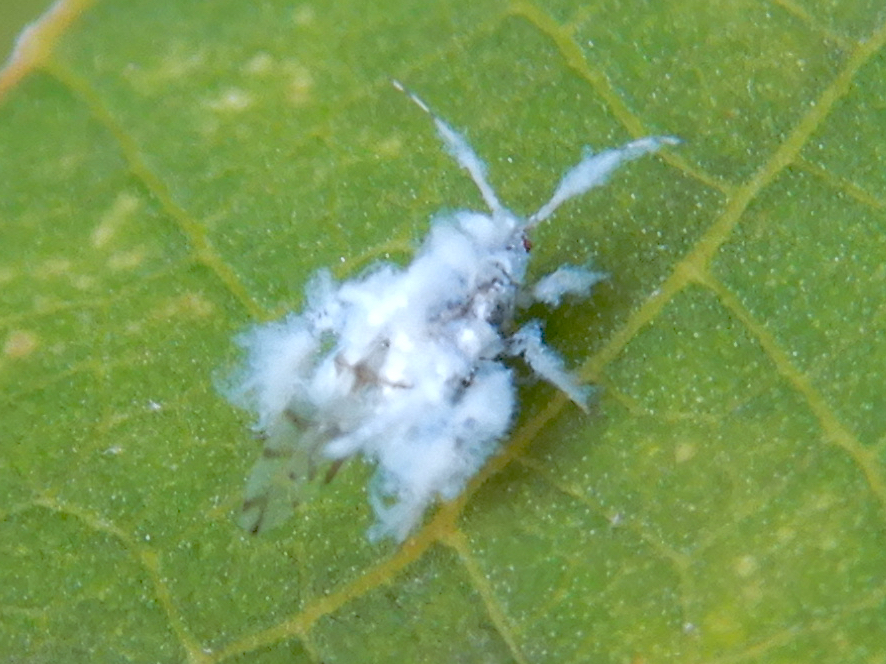
- Shivaphis celti on leaf

Scientific classification
- Kingdom: Animalia
- Phylum: Arthropoda
- Class: Insecta
- Order: Hemiptera
- Suborder: Sternorrhyncha
- Family: Aphididae
- Genus: Shivaphis
- Species: S. celti

Binomial name
- Shivaphis celti Das, 1918

Synonyms
- Shivaphis celticolens (Essig & Kuwana, 1918)

= Shivaphis celti =

Species of true bug

Shivaphis celti, the Asian woolly hackberry aphid, also known as Shivaphis (Shivaphis) celti, is an aphid in the superfamily Aphidoidea in the order Hemiptera. It is a true bug and sucks sap from plants.
