= Neomyzus circumflexus =

Scientific classification
- Domain: Eukaryota
- Kingdom: Animalia
- Phylum: Arthropoda
- Class: Insecta
- Order: Hemiptera
- Suborder: Sternorrhyncha
- Family: Aphididae
- Genus: Neomyzus
- Species: N. circumflexus

Binomial name
- Neomyzus circumflexus (Buckton, 1876)

Species of true bug

Neomyzus circumflexus, the crescent-marked lily aphid or mottled arum aphid, also known as Aulacorthum circumflexum, is an aphid in the superfamily Aphidoidea in the order Hemiptera. It is a true bug and sucks sap from plants. It is also known to transmit plant viruses.

== Host ==
Normally host in Adiantum, Calla, Cineraria, Cyclamen, Fuchsia, Zantedeschia, Viola tricolor, and Physalis peruviana.

== Economic importance ==
It is known to be a major insect pest on species of Asparagus, Begonia, and Fuchsia.
