= Matsumuraja capitophoroides =

Scientific classification
- Kingdom: Animalia
- Phylum: Arthropoda
- Class: Insecta
- Order: Hemiptera
- Suborder: Sternorrhyncha
- Family: Aphididae
- Genus: Matsumuraja
- Species: M. capitophoroides

Binomial name
- Matsumuraja capitophoroides Hille Ris Lambers, 1966

Species of true bug

Matsumuraja capitophoroides is an aphid in the order Hemiptera. It is a true bug and sucks sap from plants. It is one of the two endemic aphid species of Sri Lanka. The species was first described by Dick Hille Ris Lambers in 1966.
