= Kaltenbachiella japonica =

Scientific classification
- Kingdom: Animalia
- Phylum: Arthropoda
- Clade: Pancrustacea
- Class: Insecta
- Order: Hemiptera
- Suborder: Sternorrhyncha
- Family: Aphididae
- Genus: Kaltenbachiella
- Species: K. japonica

Binomial name
- Kaltenbachiella japonica (Matsumura, 1917)

Species of true bug

Kaltenbachiella japonica is an aphid in the superfamily Aphidoidea in the order Hemiptera. It is a true bug and sucks sap from plants.
