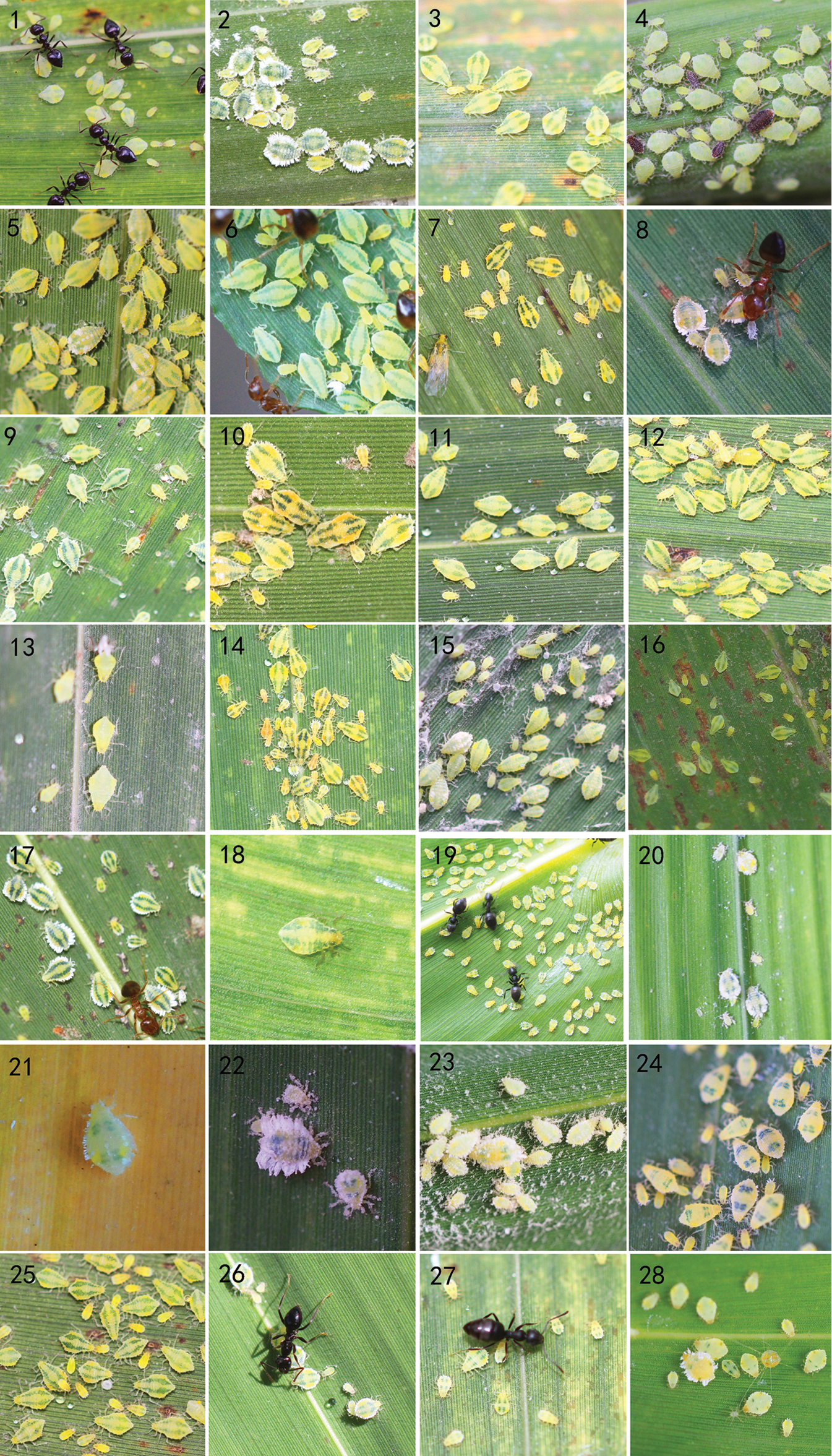
- Morphological variation in Astegopteryx bambusae

Scientific classification
- Kingdom: Animalia
- Phylum: Arthropoda
- Class: Insecta
- Order: Hemiptera
- Suborder: Sternorrhyncha
- Family: Aphididae
- Subfamily: Hormaphidinae
- Tribe: Cerataphidini
- Genus: Astegopteryx; Karsch, 1890

Synonyms
- Pseudoastegopteryx Ghosh, Pal & Raychaudhuri, 1977; Astegopteryx (Trichoregma) Takahashi, 1929; Pseudoastegopteryx; Trichoregma Takahashi, 1929; Astegopterx Wilson, 1910; Oregma Buckton, 1893

= Astegopteryx =

Genus of true bugs

Astegopteryx is a genus of aphids in the family Aphididae. The genus has an oriental distribution.

== Life cycle and ecology ==
Some species of Astegopteryx have host alternation between their primary host plants, Styrax trees, on which they form multiple-cavity galls, and secondary host plants, mainly bamboos and palms. Individuals on primary and secondary hosts are morphologically very different and have been misclassified as representatives of different species and genera. "Soldier" morphs occur on both primary and secondary hosts. However, many species can live exclusively on their secondary hosts with parthenogenetic reproduction.

Some Astegopteryx are considered pest insects, e.g., Astegopteryx formosana and Astegopteryx formosana on bamboos and Astegopteryx rhapidis on oil palms.

== Species ==
There are about 25 recognized species:

- Astegopteryx bambusae (Buckton, 1893)
- Astegopteryx basalis (van der Goot, 1917)
- Astegopteryx chinensis
- Astegopteryx esakii
- Astegopteryx ficicola
- Astegopteryx formosana (Takahashi, 1924)
- Astegopteryx glandulosa Noordam, 1991
- Astegopteryx himalayensis (Ghosh, Pal & Raychaudhuri, 1977)
- Astegopteryx indica (Ghosh, Pal & Raychaudhuri, 1977)
- Astegopteryx lambersi Takahashi, 1936
- Astegopteryx liukueinensis Liao, 1976
- Astegopteryx malaccensis (Takahashi, 1950)
- Astegopteryx minuta (van der Goot, 1917)
- Astegopteryx muiri (van der Goot, 1919)
- Astegopteryx musae (Takahashi, 1935)
- Astegopteryx neelagiriensis David, 1958
- Astegopteryx nipae (van der Goot, 1917)
- Astegopteryx pallida (van der Goot, 1917)
- Astegopteryx pandani (Takahashi, 1935)
- Astegopteryx rappardi Hille Ris Lambers, 1953
- Astegopteryx rhapidis (van der Goot, 1917)
- Astegopteryx setigera Noordam, 1991
- Astegopteryx singaporensis (van der Goot, 1919)
- Astegopteryx spinocephala Kurosu, Buranapanichpan & Aoki, 2006
- Astegopteryx styracophila Karsch, 1890
