= Alexander Mordvilko =

Alexander Konstantinovich Mordvilko (born 3 February 1867 in the area of Minsk – died 12 July 1938 in the area of Leningrad) was a Russian entomologist and parasitologist.
