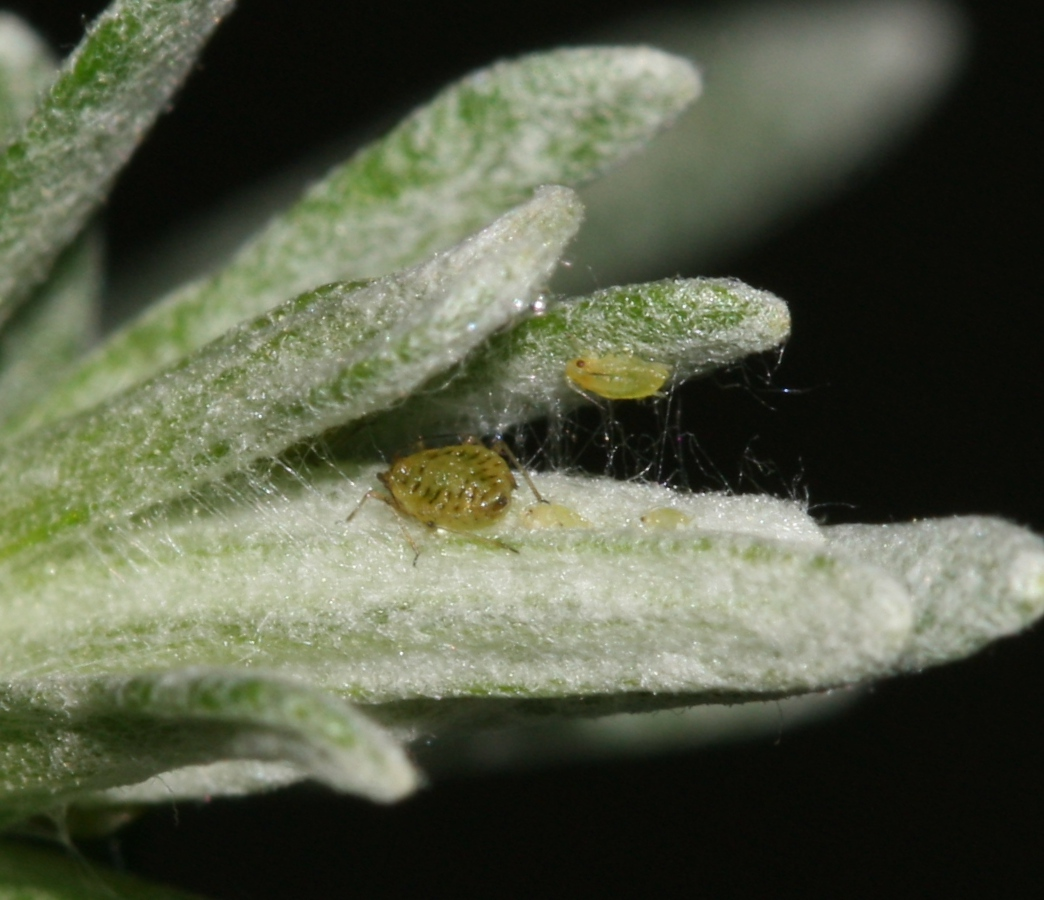

Scientific classification
- Domain: Eukaryota
- Kingdom: Animalia
- Phylum: Arthropoda
- Class: Insecta
- Order: Hemiptera
- Suborder: Sternorrhyncha
- Family: Aphididae
- Genus: Myzus
- Species: M. ornatus

Binomial name
- Myzus ornatus Laing, 1932

Synonyms
- See below

= Myzus ornatus =

Species of true bug

Myzus ornatus, the ornate aphid or violet aphid, is an aphid in the order Hemiptera. It is a true bug and sucks sap from plants. It is an invasive species.

== Host plants ==
It is known to live on both wild and domesticated cherry varieties. Also Astrantia pontica.
