= Astegopteryx bambusae =

Scientific classification
- Domain: Eukaryota
- Kingdom: Animalia
- Phylum: Arthropoda
- Class: Insecta
- Order: Hemiptera
- Suborder: Sternorrhyncha
- Family: Aphididae
- Genus: Astegopteryx
- Species: A. bambusae

Binomial name
- Astegopteryx bambusae (Buckton, 1893)

Synonyms
- Astegopteryx insularis (van der Goot, 1912); Astegopteryx lutescens (van der Goot, 1917); Astegopteryx mysorensis; Astegopteryx similis (van der Goot, 1917); Astegopteryx striata (van der Goot, 1917)

Species of true bug

Astegopteryx bambusae, the bamboo leaf aphid, is an aphid in the order Hemiptera. It is a true bug and sucks sap from plants.

== Host plant ==
The major host is Bambusa arundinacea.
