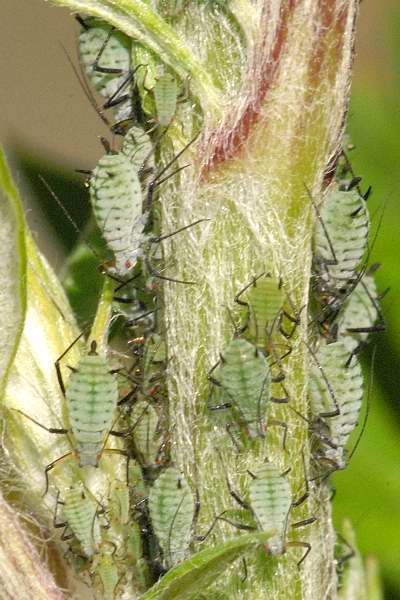
- Macrosiphoniella artemisiae

Scientific classification
- Kingdom: Animalia
- Phylum: Arthropoda
- Clade: Pancrustacea
- Class: Insecta
- Order: Hemiptera
- Suborder: Sternorrhyncha
- Family: Aphididae
- Subfamily: Aphidinae
- Tribe: Macrosiphini
- Genus: Macrosiphoniella; Del Guercio, 1911

Diversity
- at least 150 species

= Macrosiphoniella =

Genus of true bugs

Macrosiphoniella is a genus of aphids of the family Aphididae. The genus was described by Giacomo del Guercio in 1911. There are at least 150 described species in Macrosiphoniella.

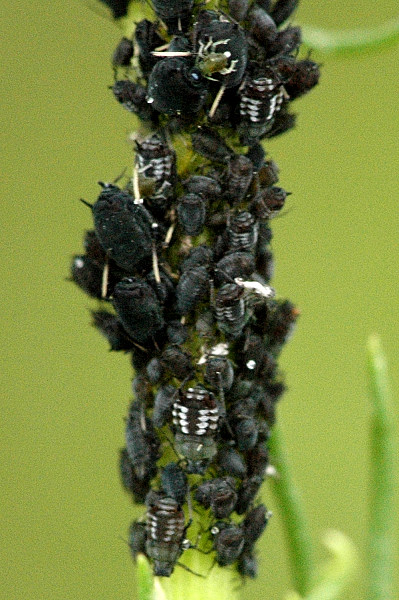
Macrosiphoniella tapuskae

== See also ==
- List of Macrosiphoniella species
