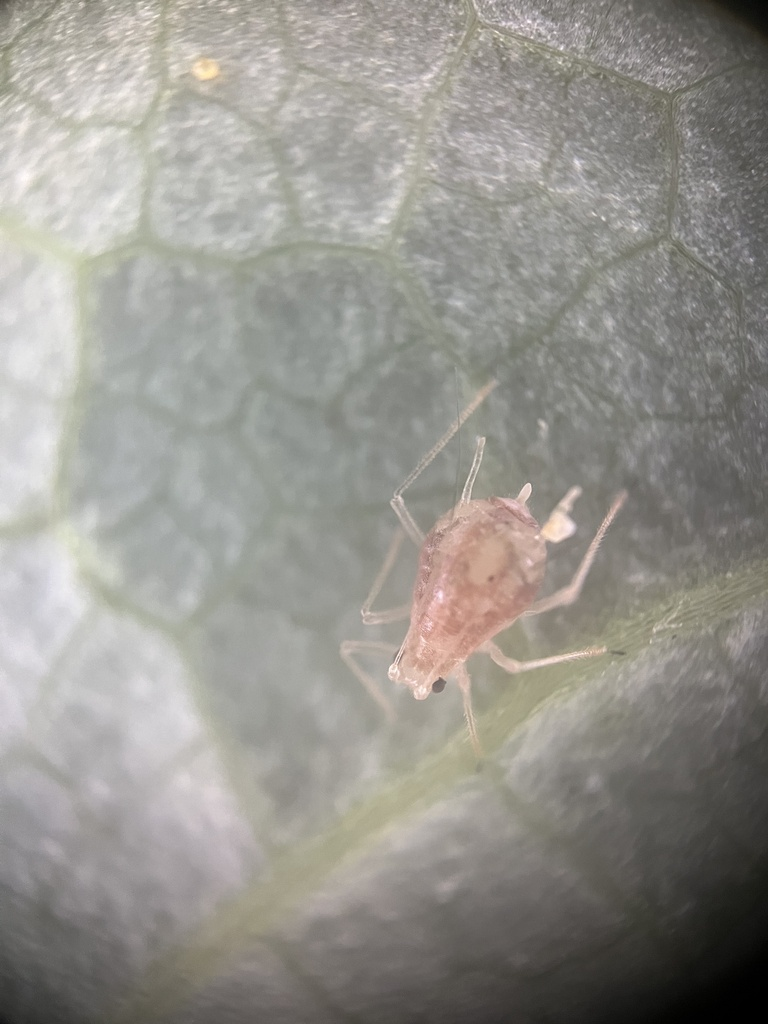
- A living specimen

Scientific classification
- Kingdom: Animalia
- Phylum: Arthropoda
- Class: Insecta
- Order: Hemiptera
- Suborder: Sternorrhyncha
- Family: Aphididae
- Genus: Macrosiphum
- Species: M. tuberculaceps

Binomial name
- Macrosiphum tuberculaceps Essig, 1942

= Macrosiphum tuberculaceps =

Species of aphid

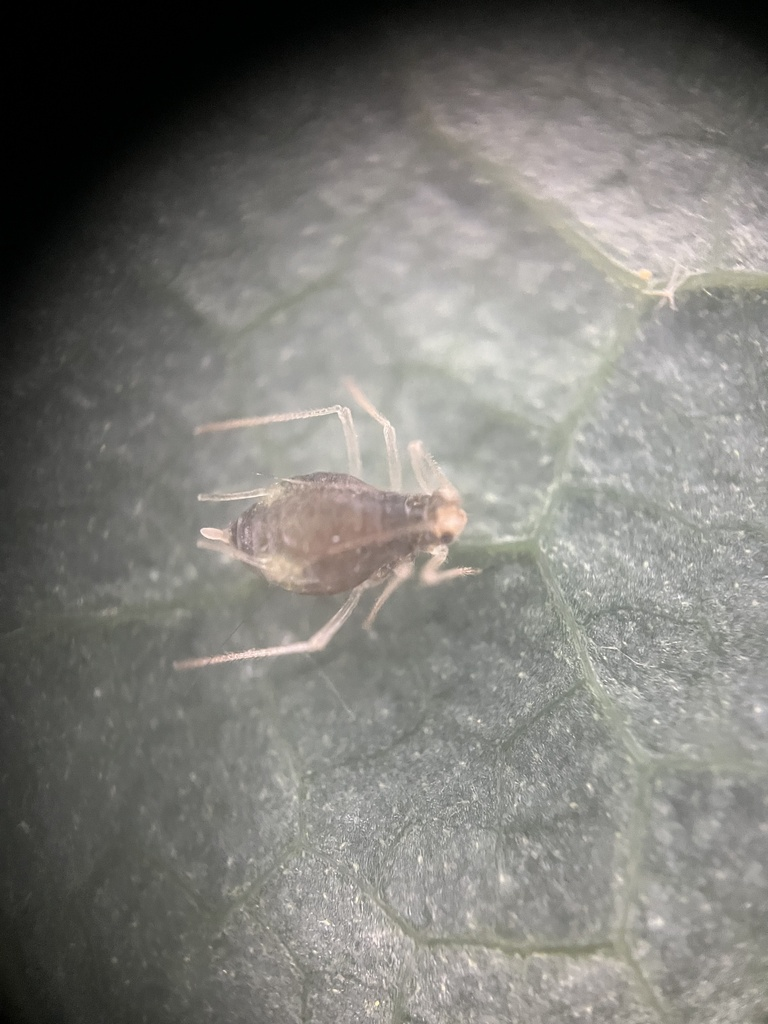
A mummy on a leaf

Macrosiphum tuberculaceps, commonly known as the sweet-after-death aphid, is an aphid in the genus Macrosiphum endemic to the Pacific Northwest.

Macrosiphum tuberculaceps exclusively uses sweet-after-death (Achlys triphylla) as its host plant, and does not stray far from it.

The main defining features of these tiny aphids are their antenna, which are longer than their teardrop shaped bodies, the siphunculi are short, inflated at the base, and blackish at the tips. the legs are generally longer than the aphid itself.
