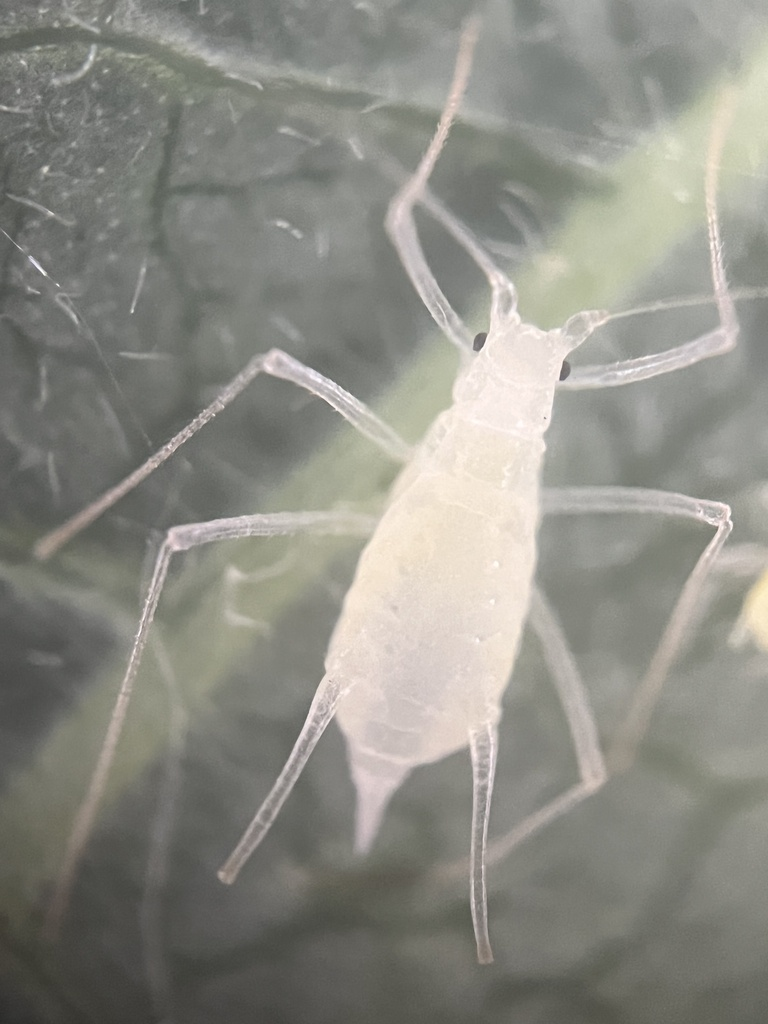

Scientific classification
- Kingdom: Animalia
- Phylum: Arthropoda
- Class: Insecta
- Order: Hemiptera
- Suborder: Sternorrhyncha
- Family: Aphididae
- Genus: Macrosiphum
- Species: M. occidentale

Binomial name
- Macrosiphum occidentale Essig, 1942

= Macrosiphum occidentale =

Species of aphid

Macrosiphum occidentale, the pale osoberry aphid, is an aphid in the genus Macrosiphum that lives exclusively on osoberry, a plant endemic to the Pacific Northwest.

This species is whitish in coloration, on spindly legs. It also has distinctly long pronounced siphunculi.

The only live photographed and georeferenced records are taken by iNaturalist user sageost, who also took it as first for the site.

Other specimens that have been recorded are collected dead, or do not have a location connected.
