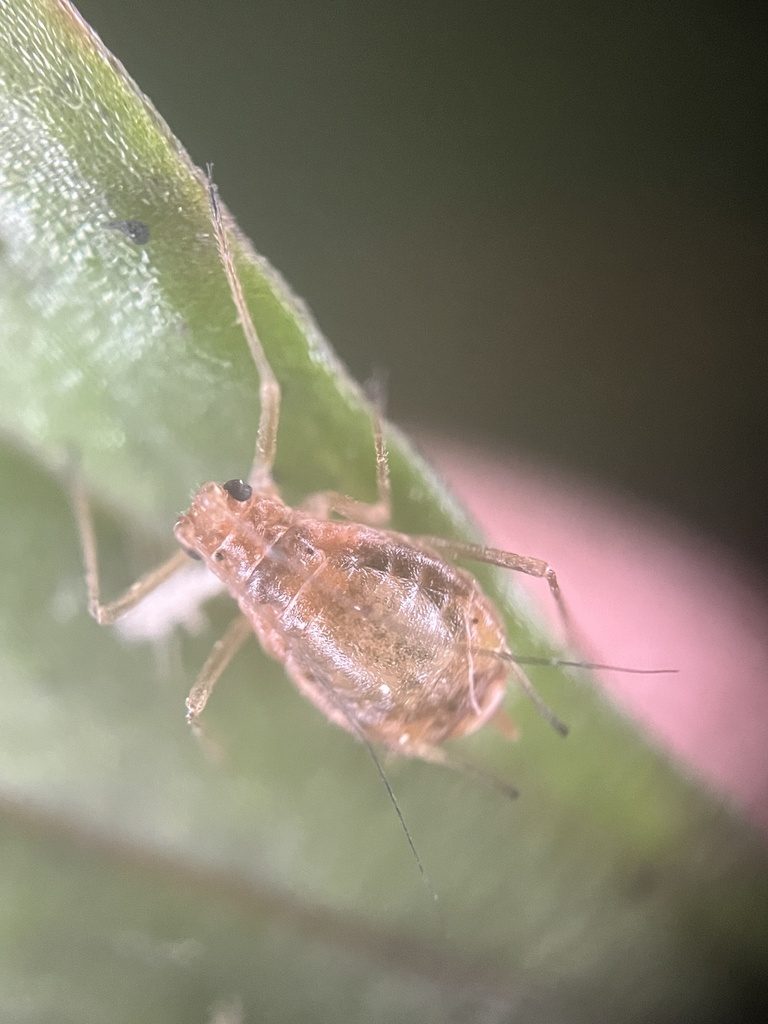

Scientific classification
- Kingdom: Animalia
- Phylum: Arthropoda
- Class: Insecta
- Order: Hemiptera
- Suborder: Sternorrhyncha
- Family: Aphididae
- Genus: Macrosiphum
- Species: M. badium

Binomial name
- Macrosiphum badium Jensen, 2000

= Macrosiphum badium =

Species of aphid

Macrosiphum badium, commonly known as the false Solomon's-seal aphid, is a species of aphid in the genus Macrosiphum found only in western North America.

Macrosiphum badium uses west coast members of the genus Maianthemum as its various host plants.

Macrosiphum badium appears reddish brown to reddish green in color, with small indentations on the sides. Its Siphunculi are medium in length and are dusky colored, with black tips.

The species was described in 2000 by Andrew Jensen.
