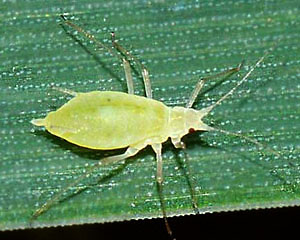

Scientific classification
- Kingdom: Animalia
- Phylum: Arthropoda
- Class: Insecta
- Order: Hemiptera
- Suborder: Sternorrhyncha
- Family: Aphididae
- Genus: Metopolophium
- Species: M. dirhodum

Binomial name
- Metopolophium dirhodum (Walker, 1849)

Synonyms
- Aphis dirhoda Walker, 1849

= Metopolophium dirhodum =

Species of true bug

Metopolophium dirhodum, the rose-grain aphid or rose-grass aphid, is a species of sap-sucking insect in the family Aphididae found worldwide. Its primary host is rose, and its secondary host is a grass, including cereals such as wheat, barley, oats and rye. It is an important vector of the barley yellow dwarf virus (BYDV) which causes serious reductions in yields of affected crops.

== Distribution ==
The rose-grass aphid has an almost cosmopolitan distribution, being found in most parts of the world where its secondary hosts are grown. It was first detected in New Zealand in 1982.

== Description ==
Wingless adults are between 2 and 3 mm (0.08 and 0.12 in) long, slender, glossy yellowish-green with a darker dorsal stripe. The antennae, legs and siphunculi (erect, backward-pointing tubes on the abdomen) are relatively long and pale in colour. Winged individuals are between 1.6 and 3.3 mm (0.06 and 0.13 in) long and a uniform green colour.

== Life cycle ==
The species overwinters on rose, its primary host, as an egg. On hatching in the spring, rose-grain aphids feed on rose at first, but do not persist on it beyond about June in the northern hemisphere, dispersing to grasses and cereal crops in midsummer. On its primary host, it is less harmful than is the rose aphid (Macrosiphum rosae), but in some years the plants may be littered with white nymphal cases and large numbers of winged females may develop in late spring and migrate in "clouds" to its secondary hosts. Cereals that are used by this aphid as their secondary hosts include wheat, barley, oats and rye. Research in New Zealand showed that barley and oats were more affected by this pest than was wheat, possibly because the lower leaves of wheat, on which the aphids tended to congregate, became senescent early in the year, giving conditions unsuitable for the further growth of the aphid.

== Symptoms on cereals ==
Symptoms shown by the host plant include abnormally coloured and contorted foliage, deposits of honeydew with subsequent growth of sooty mould, yellowing of foliage and early senescence. This aphid is one of the most important vectors of the barley yellow dwarf virus (BYDV).
