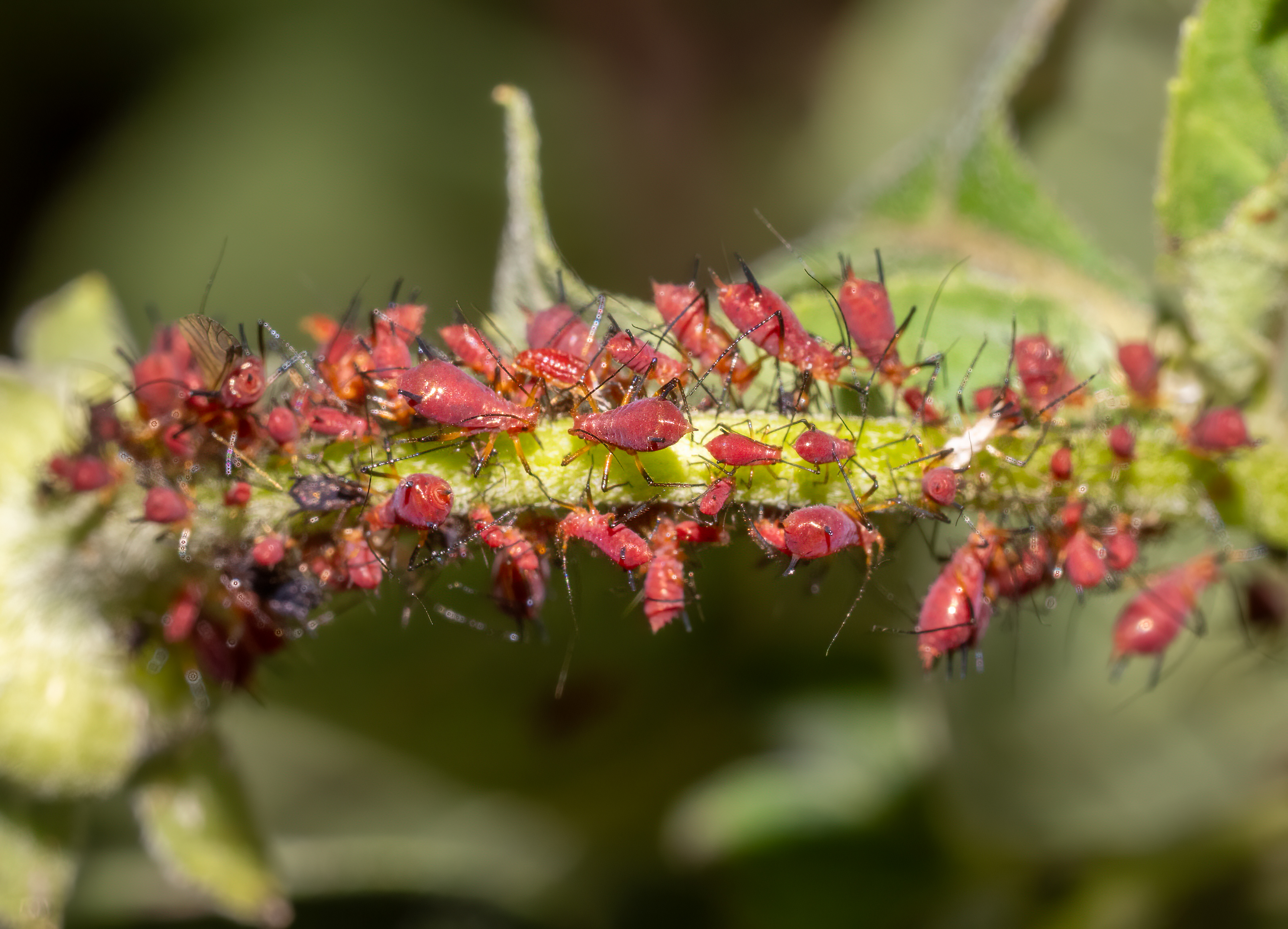
- Macrosiphum rosae

Scientific classification
- Kingdom: Animalia
- Phylum: Arthropoda
- Class: Insecta
- Order: Hemiptera
- Suborder: Sternorrhyncha
- Family: Aphididae
- Genus: Macrosiphum
- Species: M. rosae

Binomial name
- Macrosiphum rosae (Linnaeus, 1758)

Synonyms
- Aphis rosae Linnaeus, 1758

= Macrosiphum rosae =

Rose aphid

Species of true bug

Macrosiphum rosae, the rose aphid, is a species of sap-sucking aphids in the subfamily Aphidinae. They have a world-wide distribution and infest rosebushes as the main host in spring and early summer, congregating on the tips of shoots and around new buds. Later in the summer, winged forms move to other rose bushes, or to a limited number of secondary hosts, before returning to rosebushes to lay eggs in the autumn.

== Description ==
Wingless adults have a spindle-shaped body and are between 1.7 and 3.6 mm (0.07 and 0.14 in) long, slender, varying in colour from green to pink and reddish-brown. The antennae and legs are relatively long, and the cauda (tail-like protrusion) is pale. The siphunculi (pair of small backward-pointing tubes on the abdomen) are long, tapered and black, which distinguishes this aphid from Metopolophium dirhodum, the rose-grain aphid, which has pale siphunculi. Winged individuals are between 2.2 and 3.4 mm (0.09 and 0.13 in) in length, varying from green to pinkish-brown, and having distinctive black lateral markings.

== Life cycle ==
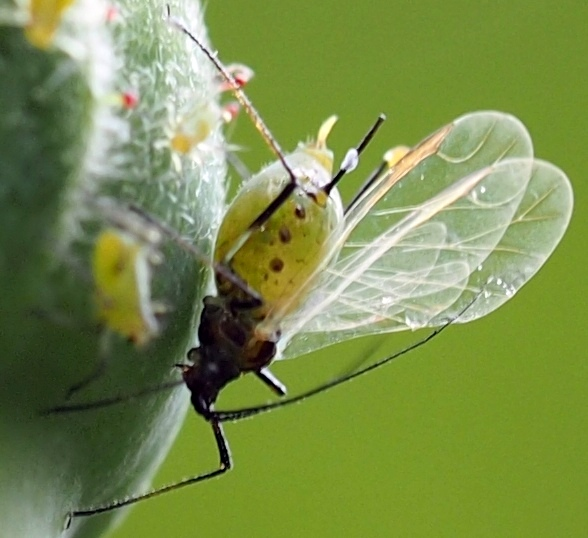
Winged form

This aphid mainly overwinters as eggs on roses, but in mild winters, some adults may survive until spring. The eggs hatch in spring into wingless females which reproduce parthenogenetically, and large colonies can quickly develop, being mainly found on the tips of shoots and around flower buds. The heaviest population densities are in June and July in the northern hemisphere, just when the bushes are flowering, and thereafter the populations decline. This is because at this time of year, some winged females develop, which migrate to other rose bushes or to certain secondary hosts such as holly, teasel, valerian, Knautia and scabious. With the onset of autumn, winged males are also produced, the insects return to roses and the eggs are laid.

== Damage done ==
Rose aphids damage the aesthetic appearance of rosebushes by contorting the flowers and foliage, and by the sticky honeydew they produce, which often provides a surface on which sooty moulds develop.
