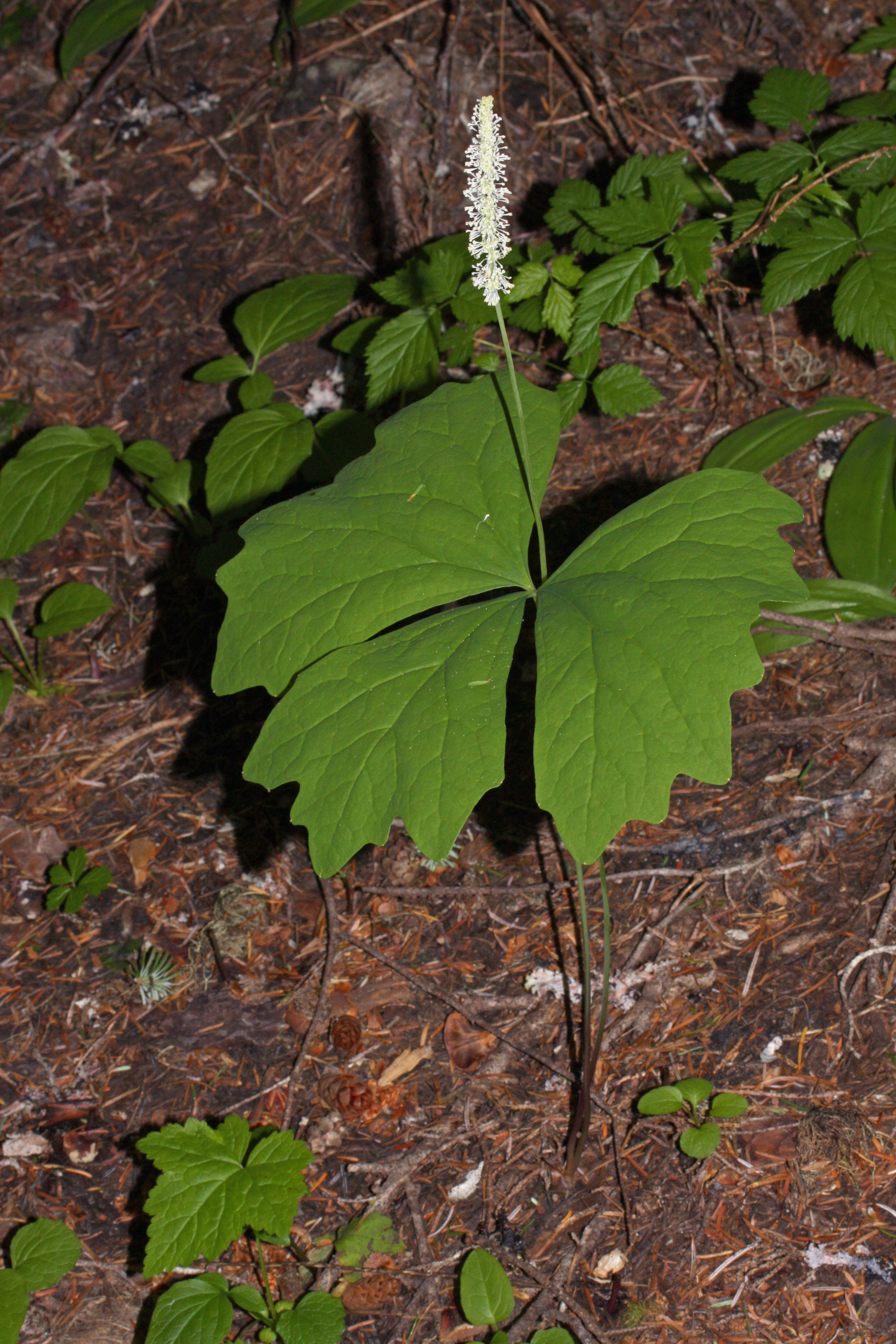
- Achlys triphylla (Mount Rainier National Park)

Scientific classification
- Kingdom: Plantae
- Clade: Embryophytes
- Clade: Tracheophytes
- Clade: Spermatophytes
- Clade: Angiosperms
- Clade: Eudicots
- Order: Ranunculales
- Family: Berberidaceae
- Genus: Achlys; DC.

Type species
- Achlys triphylla

= Achlys (plant) =

Genus of flowering plants belonging to the barberry family

Achlys is a small genus of flowering plants in the barberry family (Berberidaceae), which it shares with genera such as Berberis and Vancouveria. It is named after the Greek legendary figure associated with shade and mist, Achlys, because the plants grow in the shade.

== Species ==
There are either two or three species, depending on the authority. Achlys triphylla and Achlys californica are both native to western North America. Another Achlys is found in Japan: some authorities treat this as a subspecies of A. triphylla, while others, especially in older treatments, call this Achlys japonica. Still others consider A. triphylla and A. californica too similar to be separate species. The common names for these plants include vanilla leaf (sometimes written as vanilla-leaf or vanillaleaf, depending on the taxonomist or flora), deer's foot and sweet after death, referring to the vanilla scent of its crushed leaves.

The Plant List recognizes two species, with A. californica regarded as a subspecies of A. triphylla

Image	Scientific name	Distribution
	Achlys triphylla (Sm.) DC.	British Columbia, Washington, Oregon, NW California
	Achlys japonica Maxim.	Japan

== Description ==
Achlys triphylla, known in western North America as vanillaleaf, is an erect perennial plant that sprouts from a creeping rhizome. Leaves are long-petioled and palmately divided into three leaflets. Flowers are small and lack sepals and petals, but instead have long showy white stamens that form single erect spikes. The leaflets give a great hint to the identification of the plant: bend back the middle leaflet and you have an upside-down set of moose antlers. Alternatively, bend back the two side leaflets and you have a goose or deer foot (hence the common name). In the Pacific Northwest, Achlys triphylla is ubiquitous in moist shady forests west of the Cascades at low to middle elevations from Vancouver island and southern British Columbia south to northern California.

The plants are spaced widely on the rhizomes, but often overlap in large networks that result in carpets of Achlys that dominate the near-surface understory. Achlys seems to prefer moist soil, so at middle to higher elevations it is easier to find them along streambanks or well-shaded ravines.

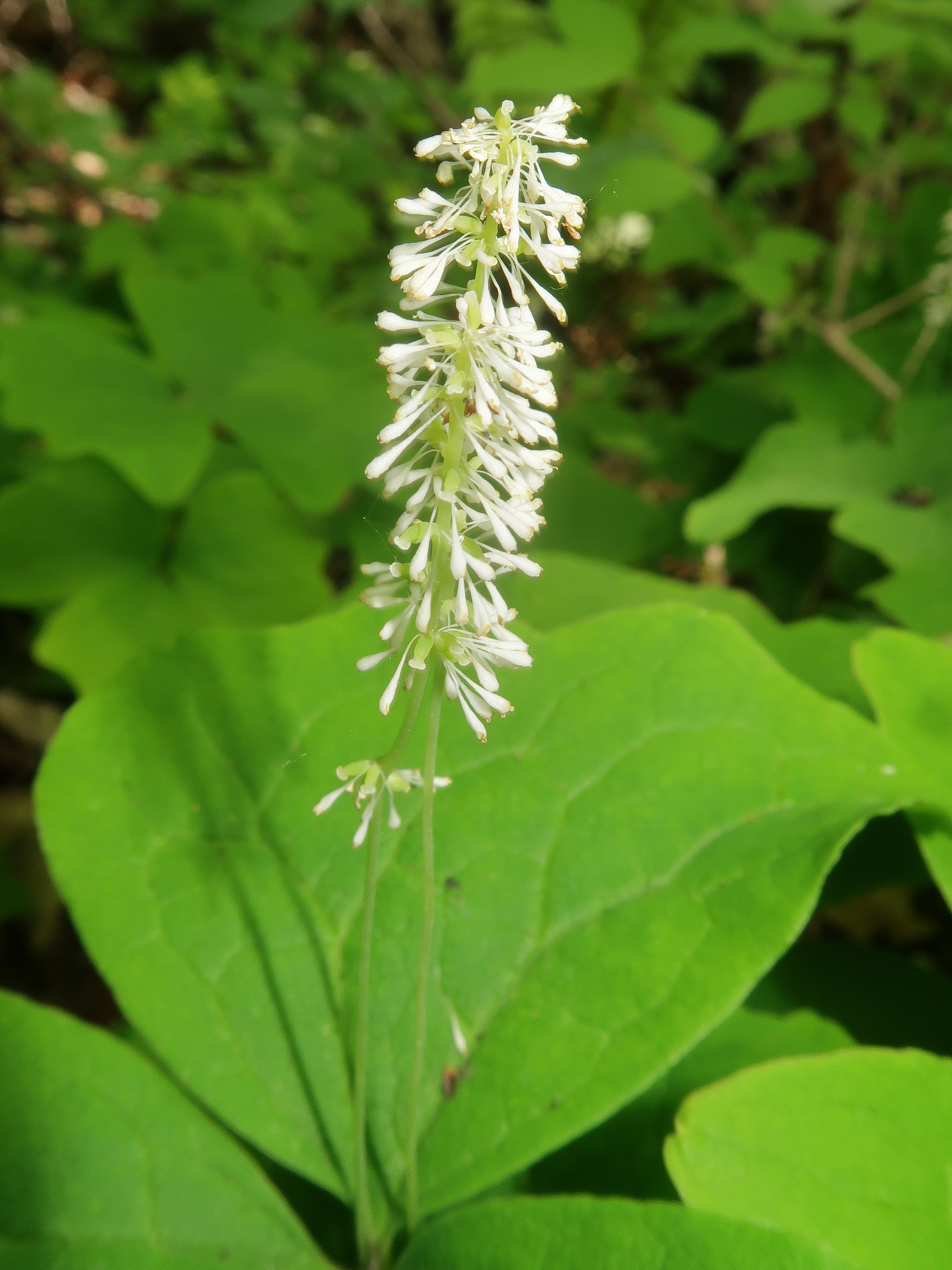
Achlys japonica flowers

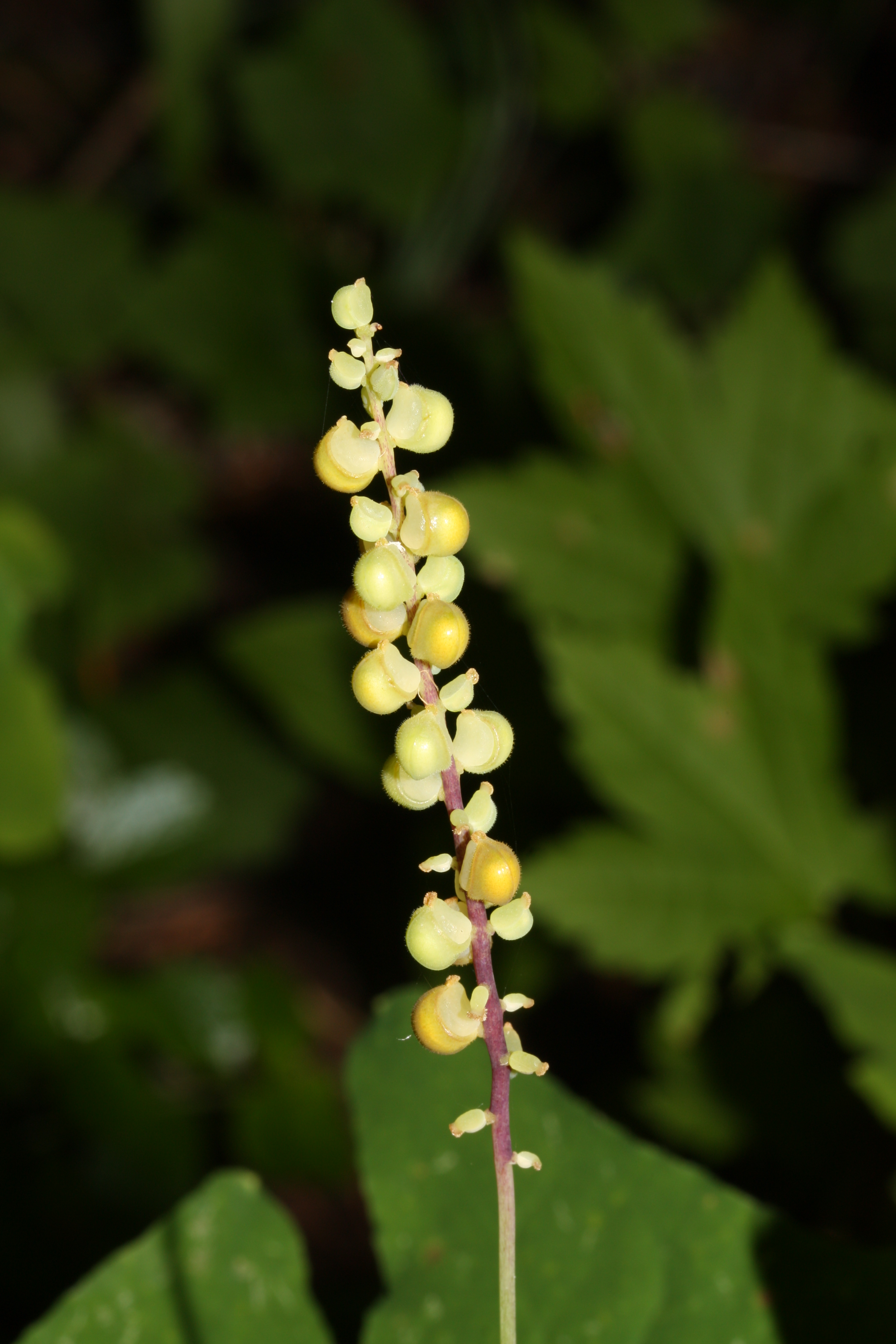
Covered with fine hairs, Achlys triphylla achenes are concave toward stem and fleshy.

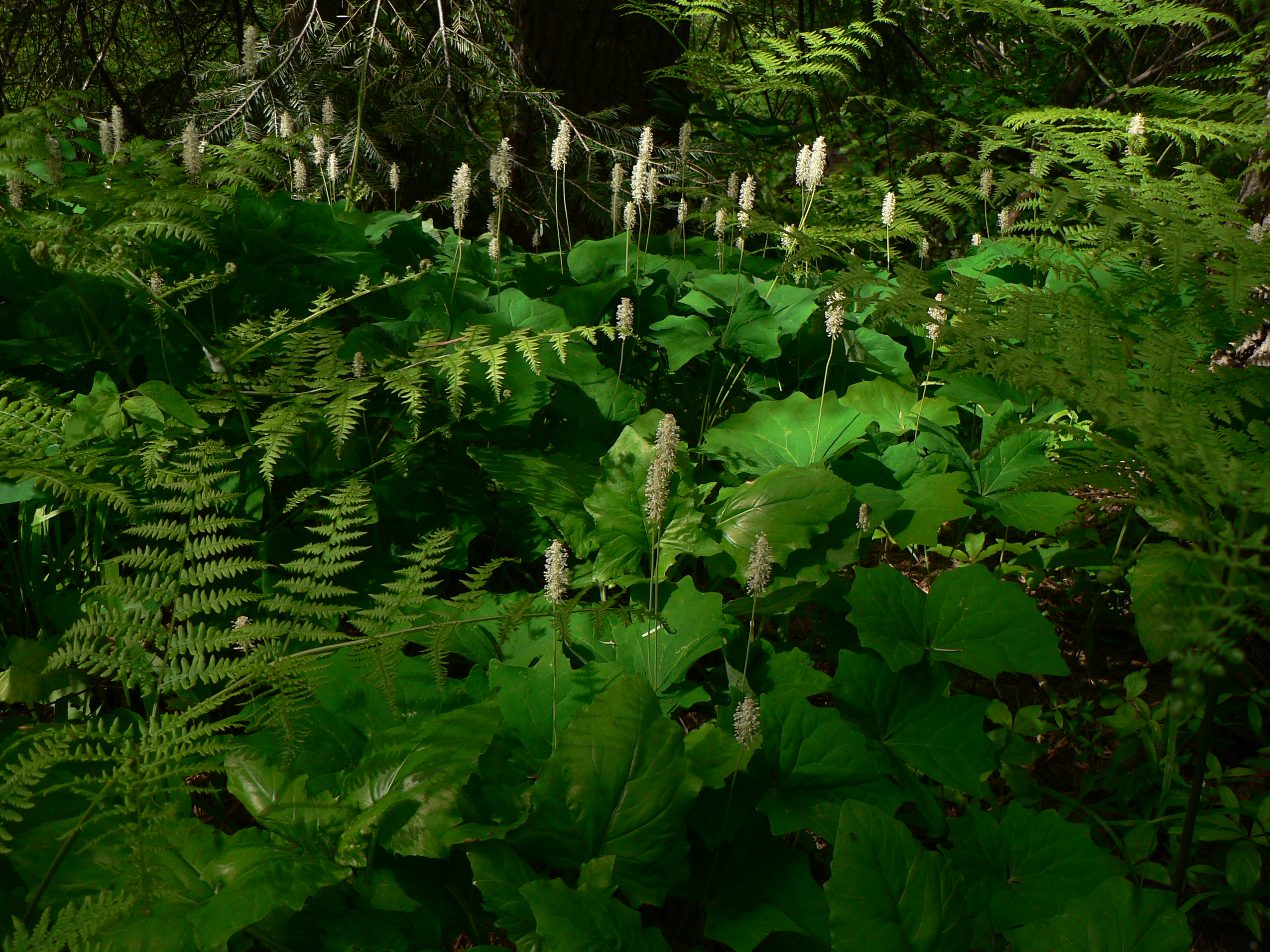
Achlys triphylla at Standup Creek Trail 1369 Wenatchee National Forest

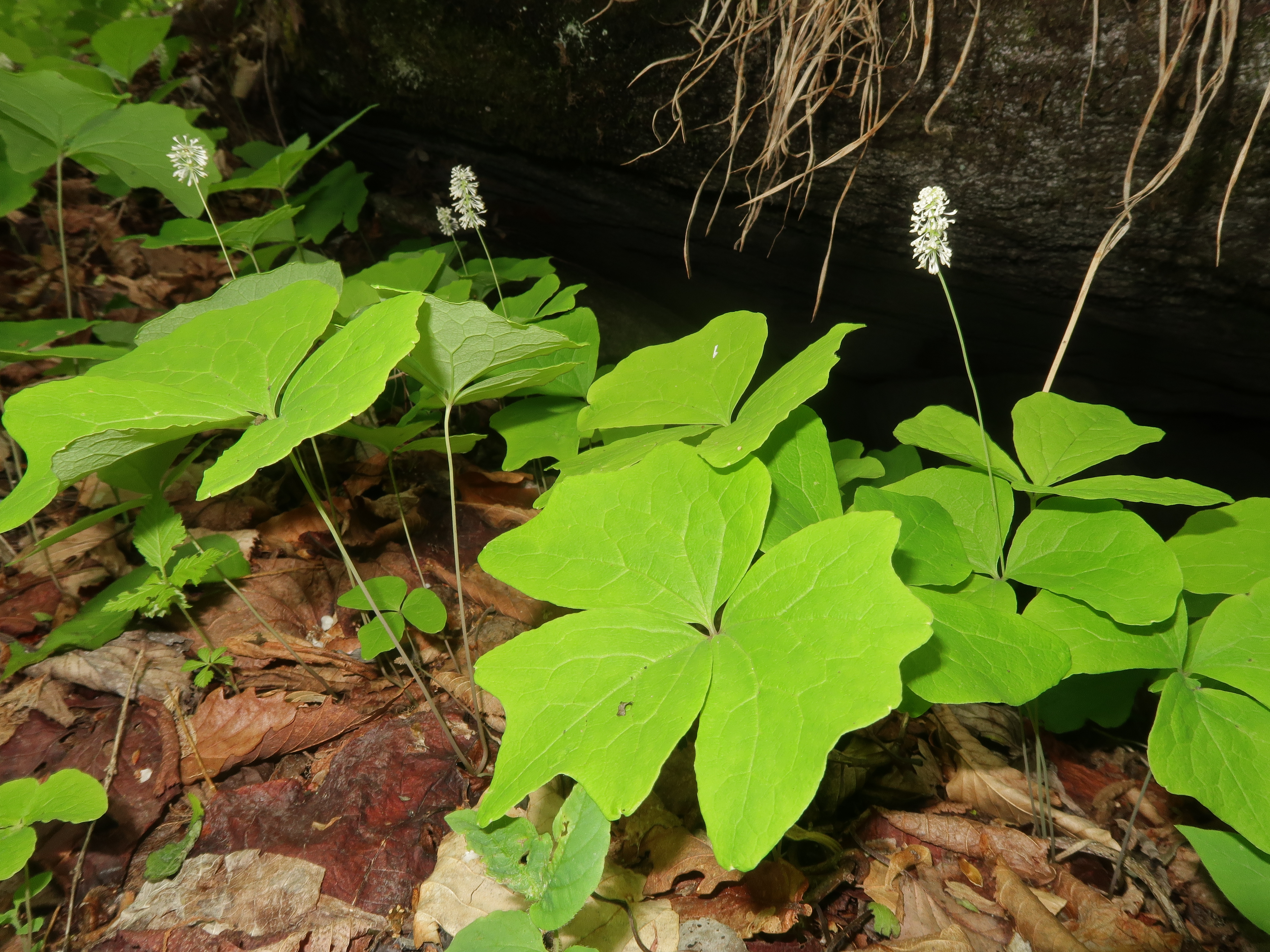
Achlys japonica growing in Kitakami Mountains, Iwate prefecture, Japan

== Insect repellent ==
When dried properly, the plants are strongly aromatic and smell of vanilla. Besides serving as an excellent tent air freshener, Achlys has been used by native tribes of southern British Columbia as an insect repellent. The dried leaves were hung in bunches in doorways to ward off flies and mosquitoes, and it is not unheard of for naturalists to rub the dried or even fresh leaves on exposed skin when hiking the Olympics or Cascades during the summer mosquito season.

Japanese Achlys are quite similar to those found in western North America.
