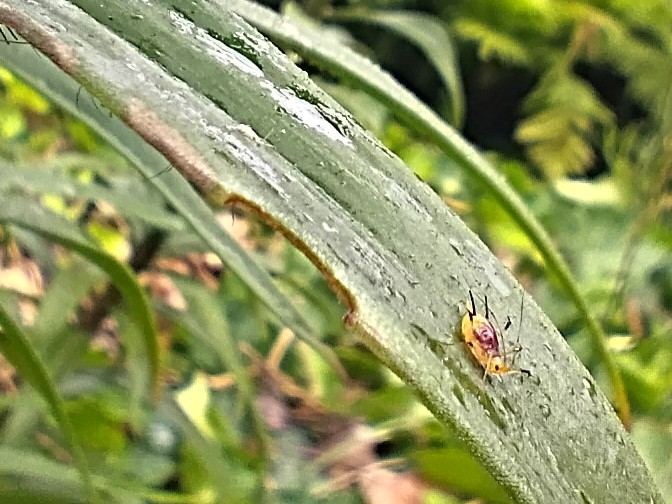
- Resting alone atop a lily leaf, Queens, NY

Scientific classification
- Domain: Eukaryota
- Kingdom: Animalia
- Phylum: Arthropoda
- Class: Insecta
- Order: Hemiptera
- Suborder: Sternorrhyncha
- Family: Aphididae
- Genus: Macrosiphum
- Species: M. lilii

Binomial name
- Macrosiphum lilii Monell, 1880

= Macrosiphum lilii =

Purple-spotted Lily Aphid

Aphid found in North America

Macrosiphum lilii, commonly known as the purple-spotted lily aphid, is a species of insect in the family Aphididae.

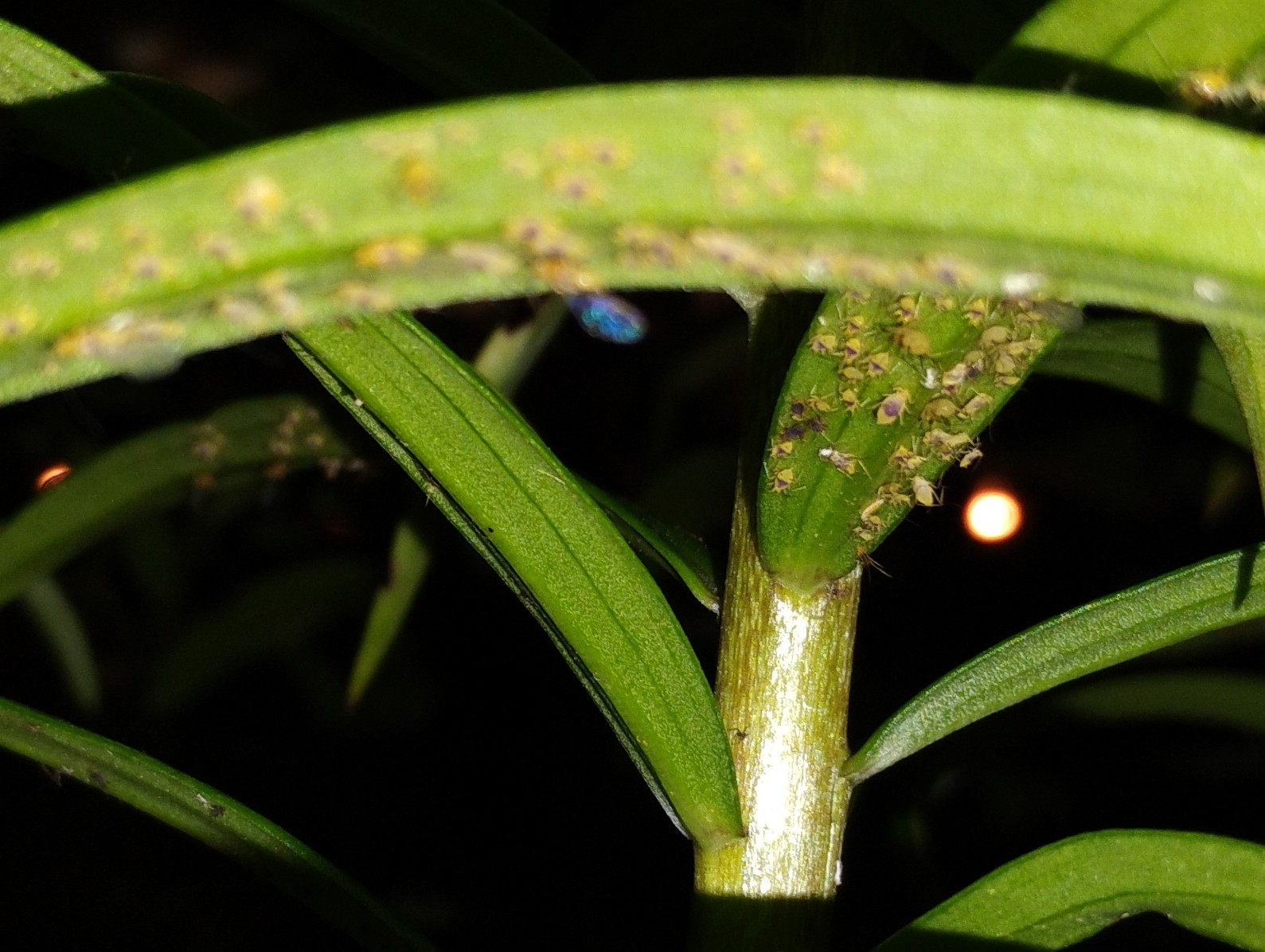
Congregating on the underside of lily leaves

M. lilii consumes the phloem, or nutrient-rich sap, of plants. Nymphs and adults alike use their mouthparts to poke into the outer plant tissue, often the leaves of a plant, to feed on the phloem within.
