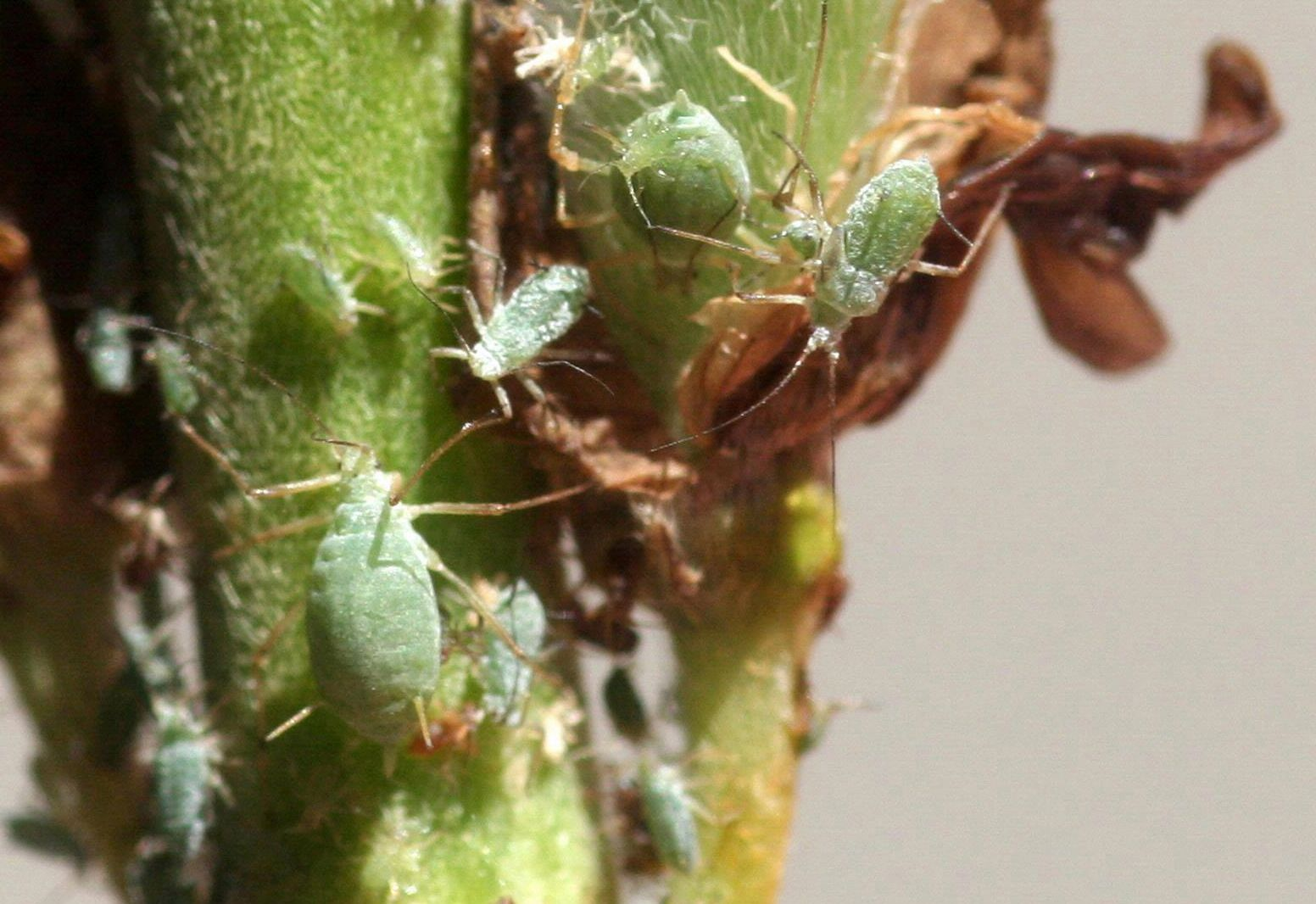

Scientific classification
- Kingdom: Animalia
- Phylum: Arthropoda
- Class: Insecta
- Order: Hemiptera
- Suborder: Sternorrhyncha
- Family: Aphididae
- Genus: Macrosiphum
- Species: M. albifrons

Binomial name
- Macrosiphum albifrons Essig

= Macrosiphum albifrons =

Species of true bug

Macrosiphum albifrons, the lupin aphid, is a species of large grey/ green aphid in the family Aphididae.

It is a species native to North America which was first reported in the UK in 1981 where it now occurs widely.

Infestations cause lupin plants to wilt and collapse. This may be because the aphid has no natural predators in the UK and populations can grow unchecked.
