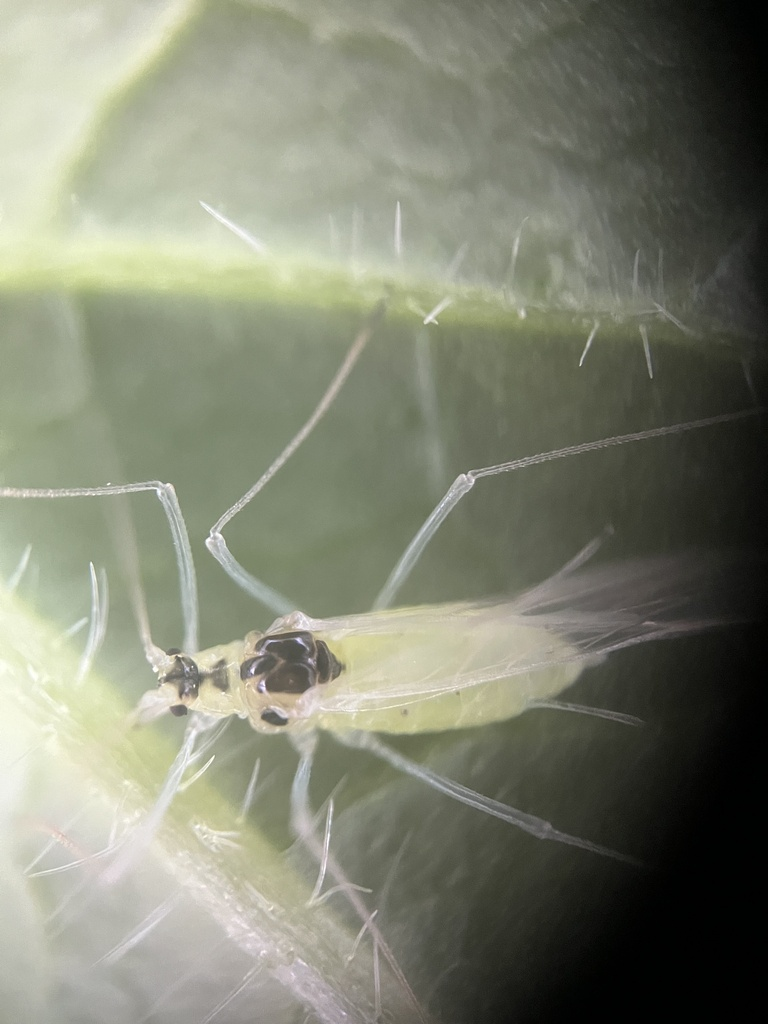

Scientific classification
- Kingdom: Animalia
- Phylum: Arthropoda
- Class: Insecta
- Order: Hemiptera
- Suborder: Sternorrhyncha
- Family: Aphididae
- Genus: Macrosiphum
- Species: M. stanleyi

Binomial name
- Macrosiphum stanleyi Wilson, 1915

= Macrosiphum stanleyi =

Species of aphid

Macrosiphum stanleyi, commonly known as the spindly elderberry aphid, is an aphid in the genus Macrosiphum found in the Western United States, ranging into Utah and neighboring states.

Macrosiphum stanleyi uses red elderberry and blue elderberry as its dominant hosts, which it feeds off of.

This species is identified by its larger than life legs, an almond shaped body with a spine at the end, and brown 4 cross on its back in winged adults. They are light yellowish green in coloration.
