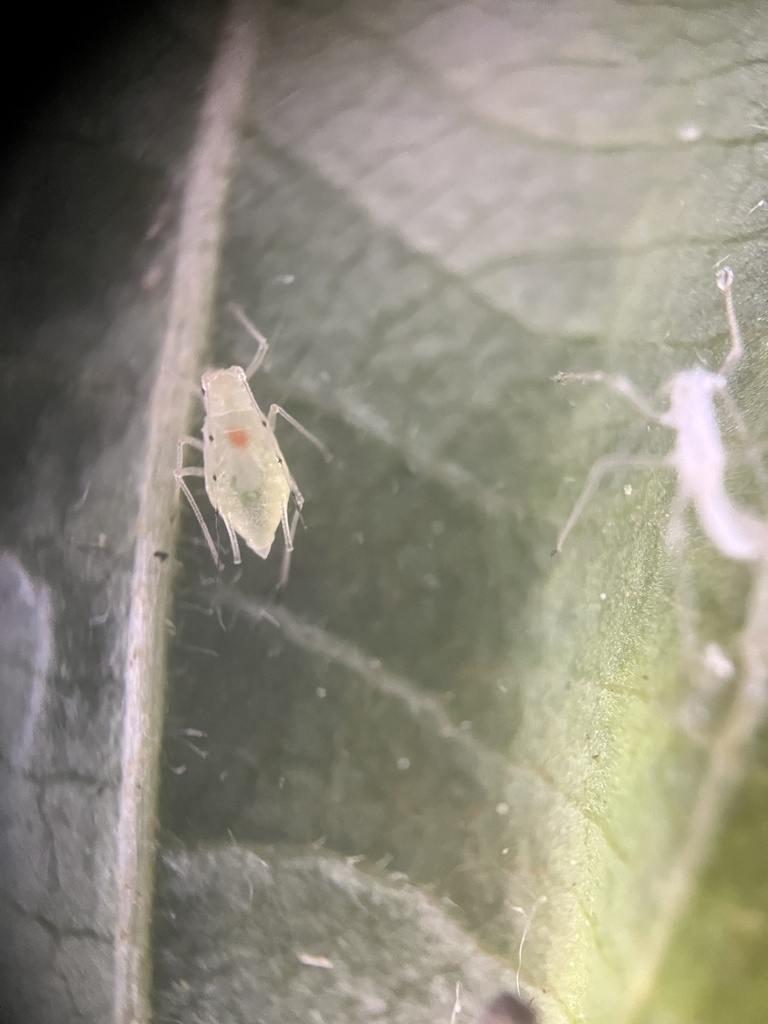

Scientific classification
- Kingdom: Animalia
- Phylum: Arthropoda
- Class: Insecta
- Order: Hemiptera
- Suborder: Sternorrhyncha
- Family: Aphididae
- Genus: Macrosiphum
- Species: M. rhamni

Binomial name
- Macrosiphum rhamni Clarke, 1903

= Macrosiphum rhamni =

Species of aphid

Macrosiphum rhamni, commonly known as the buckthorn-fern aphid, is an aphid in the genus Macrosiphum found in North America.

This species is characterized by its dark antennal stripes, and on mature aphids, a yellow spot in the middle of the abdomen.

The host of this aphid varies across its range. In the Puget lowlands of Washington state for example, it is only found on hairy brackenfern and occasionally on cascara. On the other hand, when you go down to Oregon, Texas, and California you start seeing it using hosts like Rhamnus californica.

This aphid is not well studied, but is not likely under threat, seeing as its main host fern is extremely widespread across its range.
