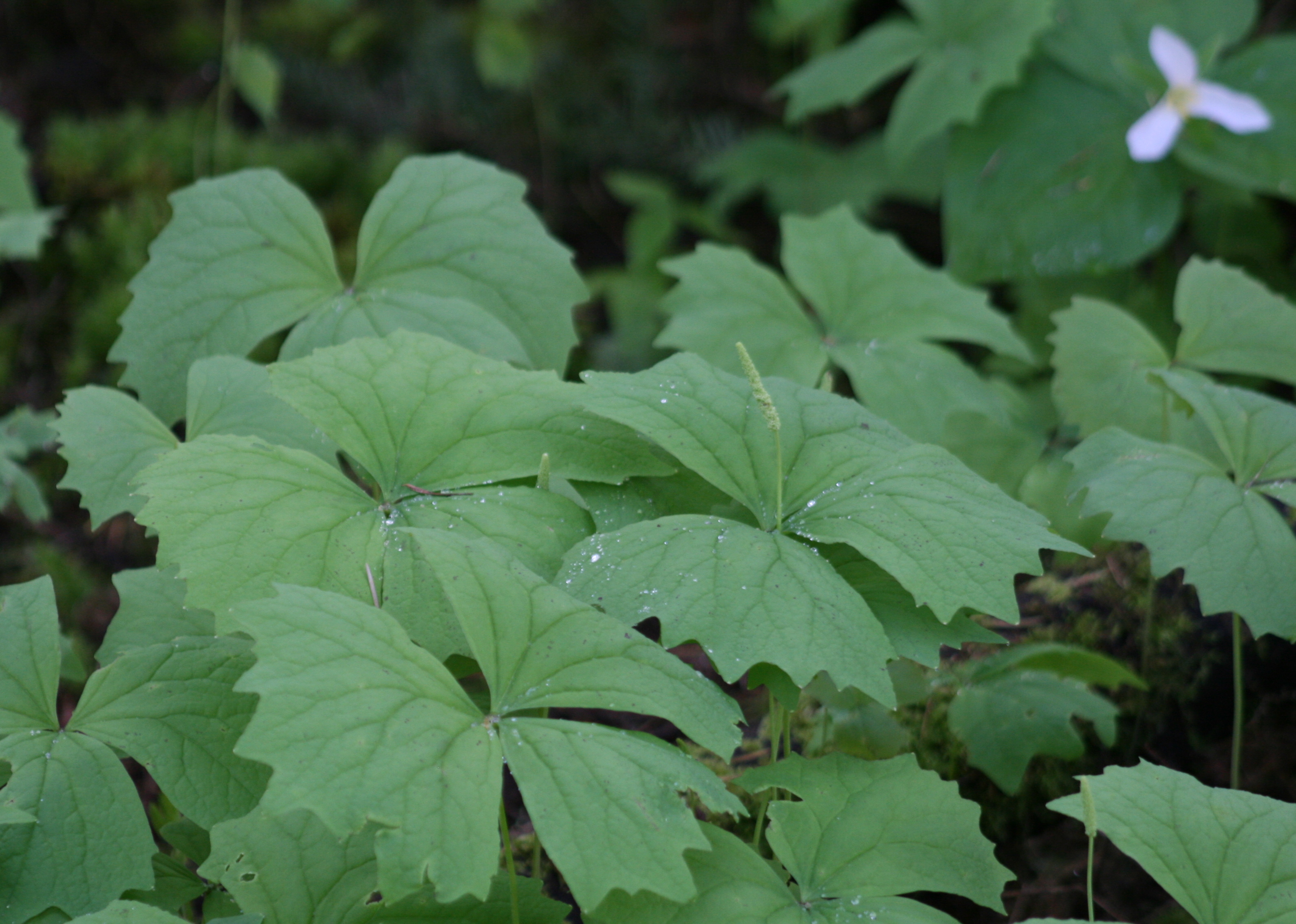
- Achlys triphylla (Rood Bridge Park, Hillsboro, Oregon)

Conservation status
- Secure (NatureServe)

Scientific classification
- Kingdom: Plantae
- Clade: Embryophytes
- Clade: Tracheophytes
- Clade: Angiosperms
- Clade: Eudicots
- Order: Ranunculales
- Family: Berberidaceae
- Genus: Achlys
- Species: A. triphylla

Binomial name
- Achlys triphylla (Sm.) DC.

Synonyms
- Leontice triphylla Smith in A. Rees

= Achlys triphylla =

Species of flowering plant

Achlys triphylla, with the common names deer foot, vanilla leaf, or sweet after death, is a plant species native to the mountains of the West Coast of North America.

== Description ==
Achlys triphylla is an herb up to 50 centimetres (20 in) tall. It grows in patches of paired stalks, one topped by a leaf, the other a flower spike. The leaf is trifoliate, with leaflets up to 10 cm (4 in) long; the middle leaflet has 3–5 or exceptionally 8 teeth. The dried leaves smell like vanilla.

Blooming from April to June, the flower spike is up to 5 cm (2 in) long, with small flowers lacking petals and sepals, but including 6–13 white stamens.

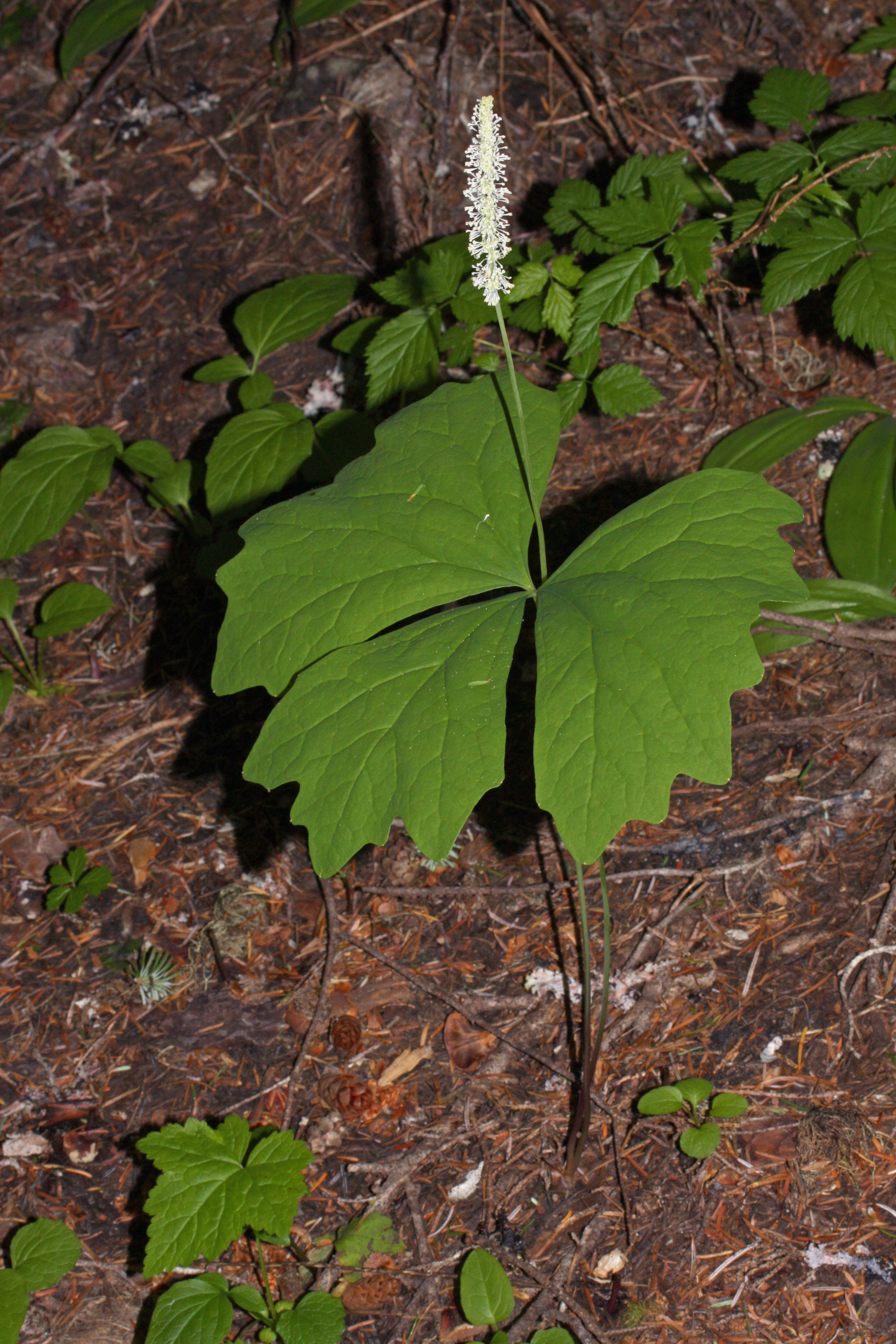
The paired stalks

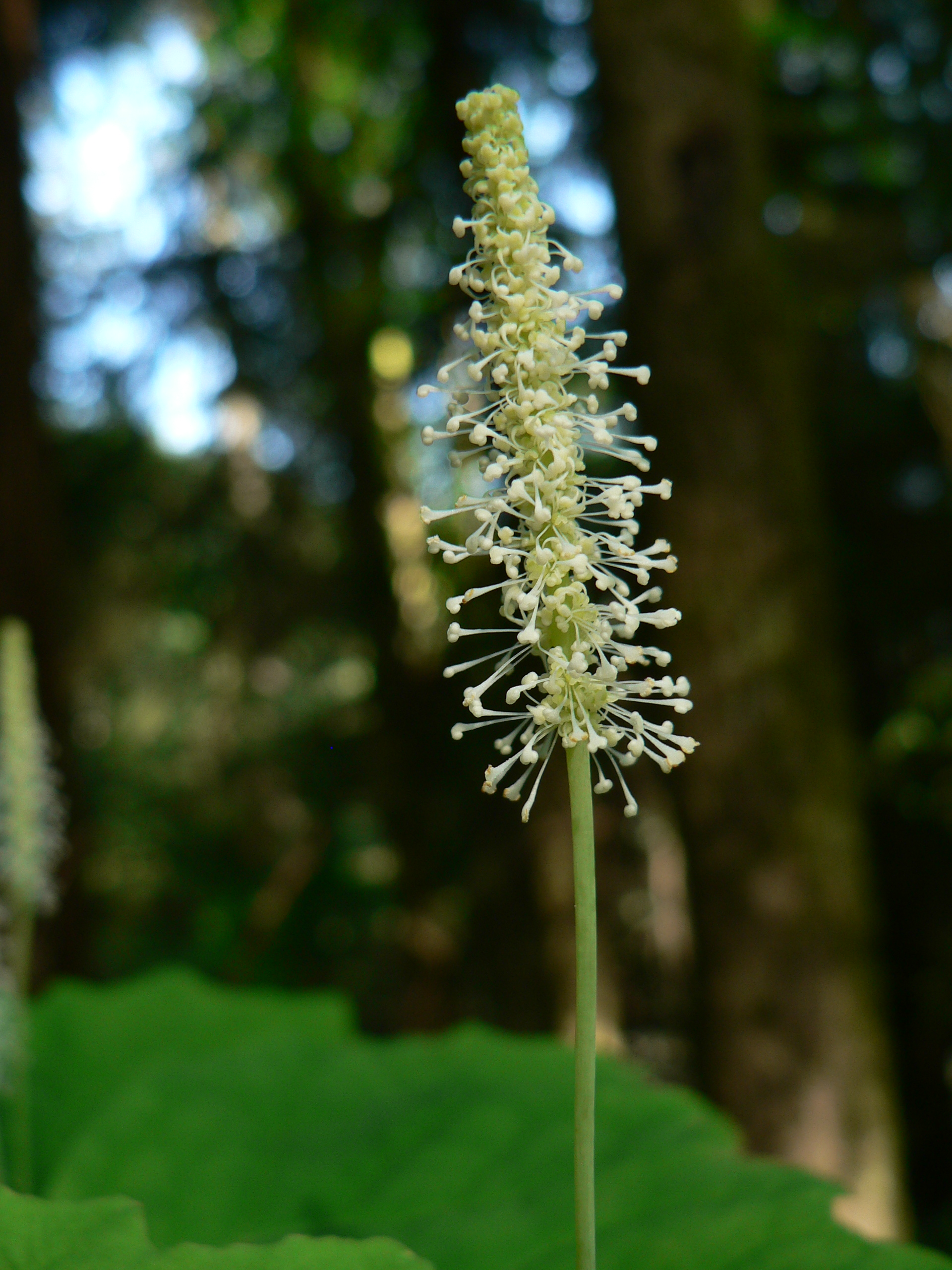
Immature flower spike

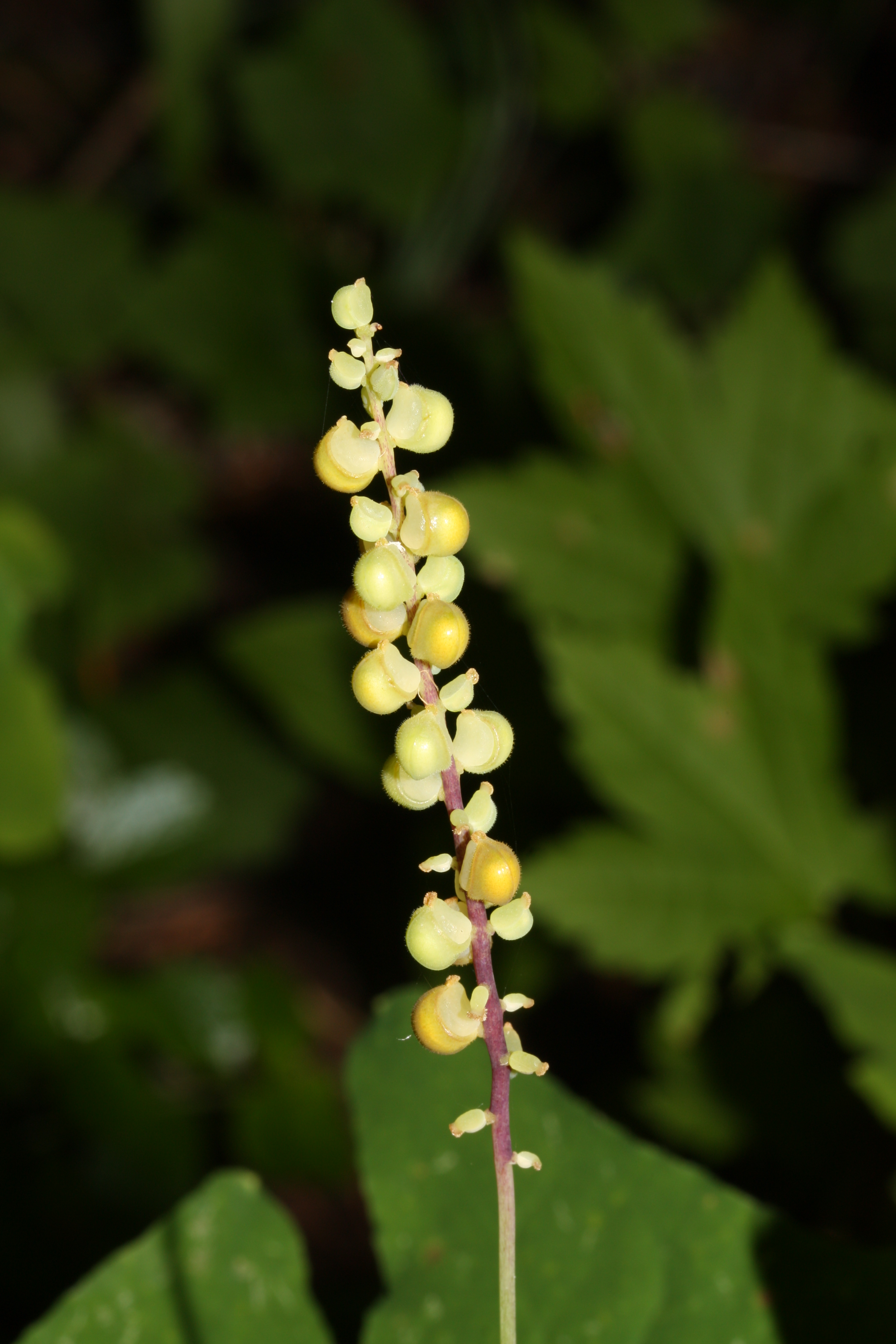
Mature flowers

=== Similar species ===
The species resembles A. californica, which has 6–8 (up to 12) teeth on the middle leaflet.

== Distribution and habitat ==
Native to the woods of mountains of the West Coast of North America, the species has been reported from the Cascades and from the Coast Ranges in British Columbia, Washington, Oregon and northern California, at elevations of up to 1,500 metres (4,900 ft).

== Host Associations ==
This plant is the sole host of the west coast endemic aphid Macrosiphum tuberculaceps.

== Medicinal uses ==
Multiple Pacific Northwest tribes use the leaves in an infusion drink for tuberculosis. One Lummi informant said the whole plant was mashed and soaked in water, which was drunk as an emetic.
