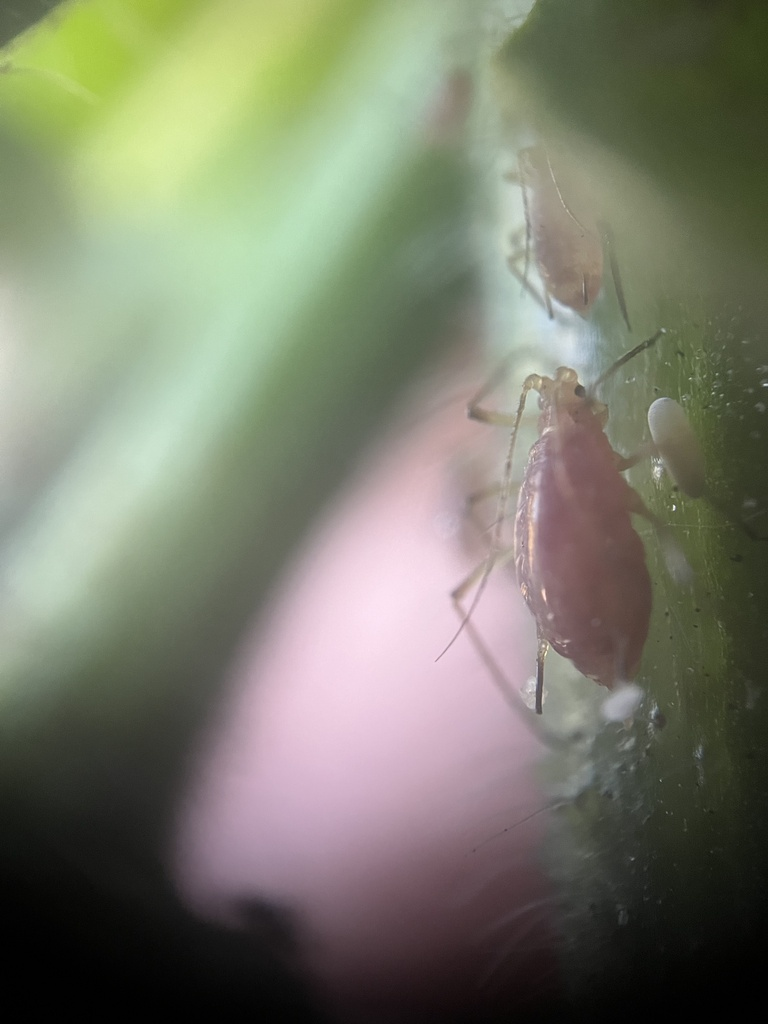

Scientific classification
- Kingdom: Animalia
- Phylum: Arthropoda
- Class: Insecta
- Order: Hemiptera
- Suborder: Sternorrhyncha
- Family: Aphididae
- Genus: Macrosiphum
- Species: M. gaurae

Binomial name
- Macrosiphum gaurae Williams, 1911

= Macrosiphum gaurae =

Species of aphid

Macrosiphum gaurae, commonly known as the beeblossom aphid, is an aphid endemic to the North American continent.

== Host plants ==
This species uses evening primrose and beeblossom as its main host plants.

== Range and distribution ==
This aphid ranges from the east coast to the west coast of North America, with its range getting spotty around BC to Oregon, where it occurs quite rarely.

== Color forms ==
There are two forms: a pink form and a green(er) form. They both have the same features, but the pink form is easier to identify since Macrosiphum gaurae is the only aphid in North America that matures to a brilliant rose pink. A more uncommon form is the orange form, which is not frequently observed online.

== Appearance ==
The siphunculi are black like that of Macrosiphum rosae but the biggest thing to note is the host plant and aphid coloration, because Macrosiphum rosae does not use evening primrose plants or beeblossom plants, it uses Rosa species. Additionally there is an indent towards the butt spike of the aphid that distinguishes it from Macrosiphum rosae which does not have that deep of an indentation.
