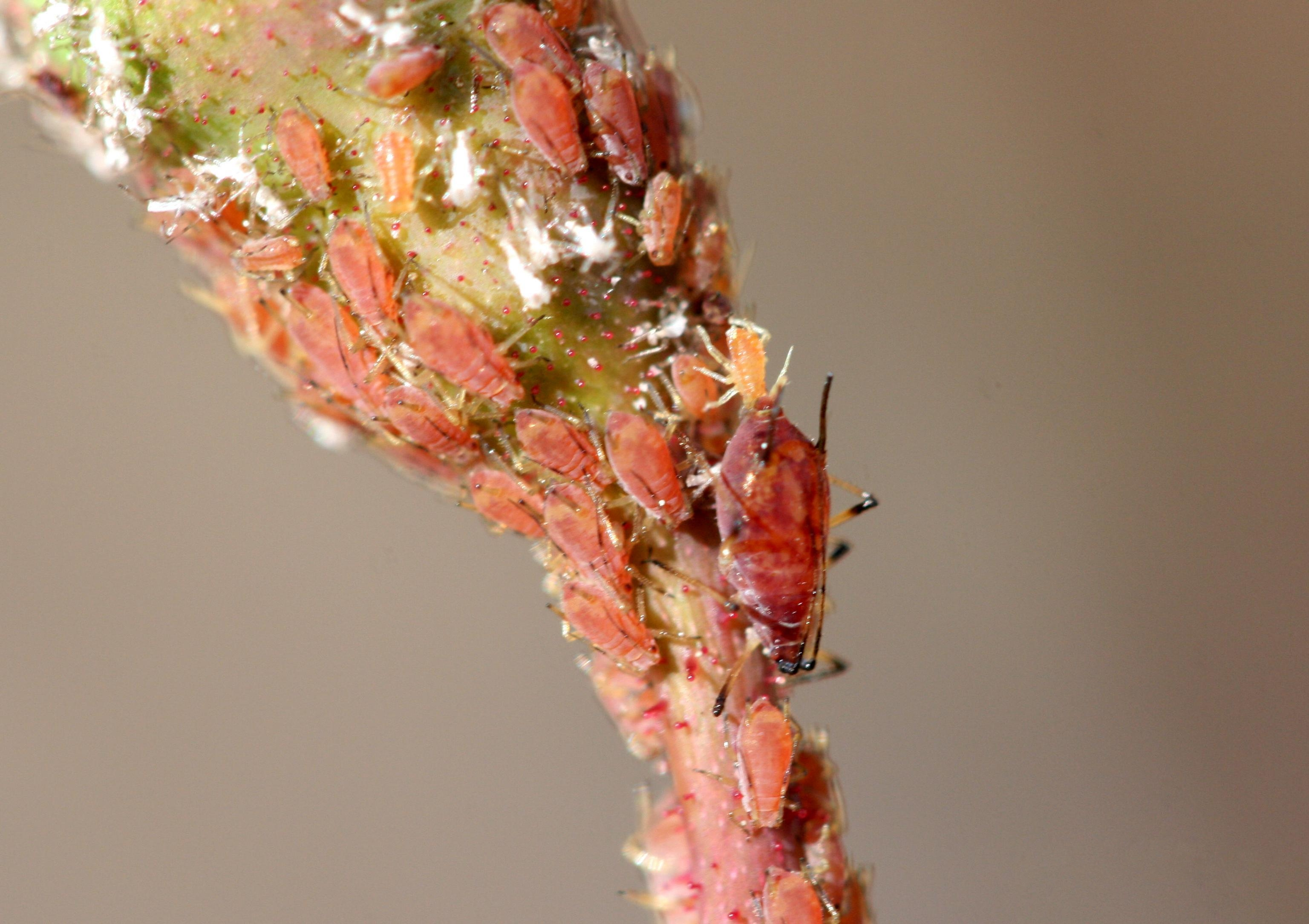
- Macrosiphum rosae colony

Scientific classification
- Kingdom: Animalia
- Phylum: Arthropoda
- Class: Insecta
- Order: Hemiptera
- Suborder: Sternorrhyncha
- Family: Aphididae
- Subfamily: Aphidinae
- Tribe: Macrosiphini
- Genus: Macrosiphum; Passerini, 1860

= Macrosiphum =

Genus of true bugs

Macrosiphum is a genus of aphid. During the summer populations are made of parthenogenetic females. In the fall, males and females are produced; they mate and females lay eggs that overwinter. There are over 160 spp. in 3 subgenera.

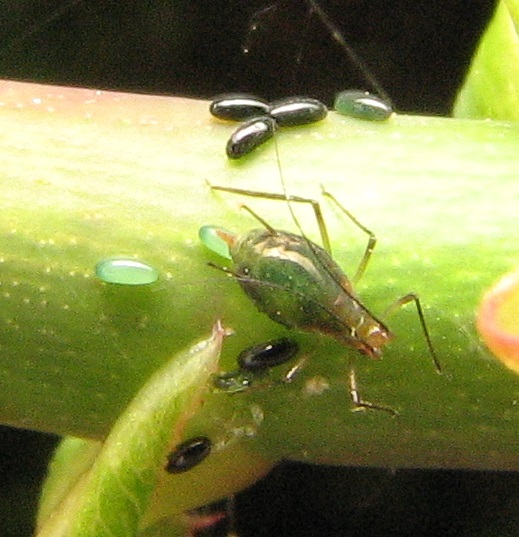
Macrosiphum sp. laying eggs on rose bush

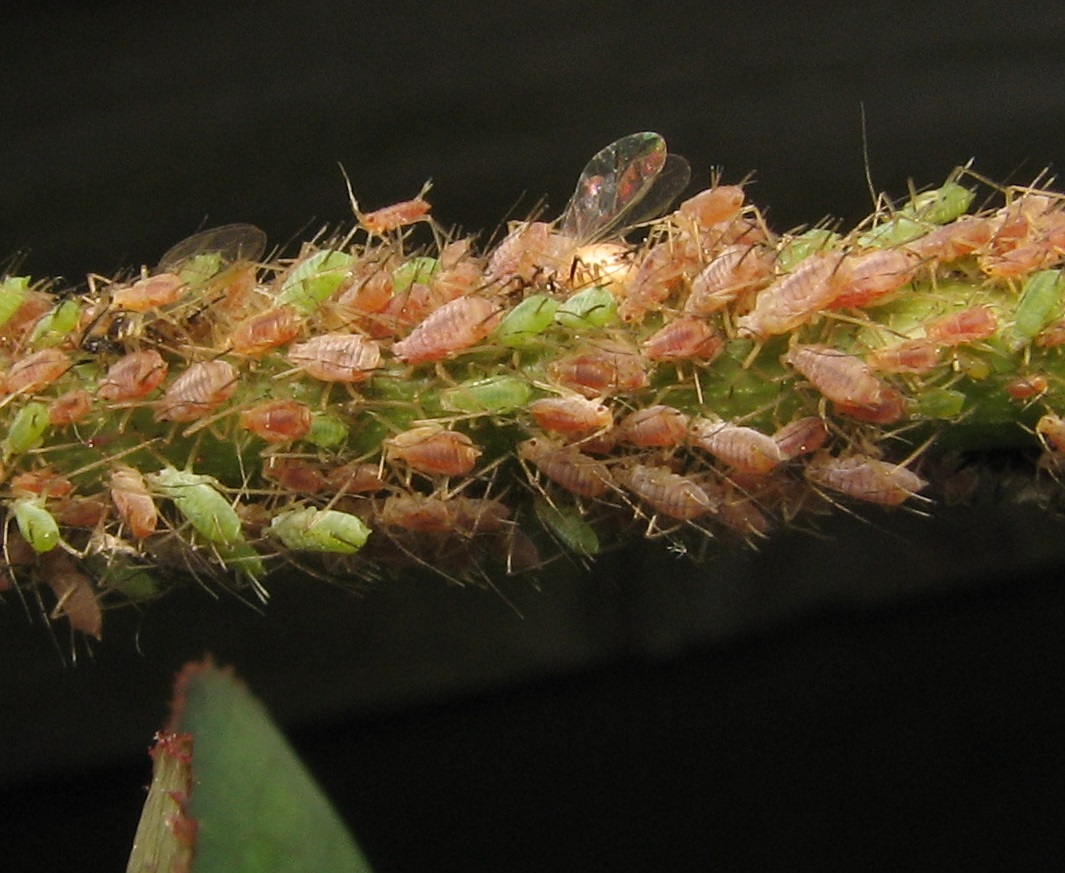
Macrosiphum rosae

== Species ==
The following species are recognised in the genus Macrosiphum:

- Macrosiphum adianti (Oestlund, 1886)
- Macrosiphum aetheocornum Smith & Knowlton, 1939
- Macrosiphum agrimoniellum (Cockerell, 1903)
- Macrosiphum albertinae Hille Ris Lambers, 1967
- Macrosiphum albifrons Essig, 1911
- Macrosiphum alpinum Meier, 1967
- Macrosiphum amelanchiericolens Patch, 1919
- Macrosiphum americanum Mordvilko, 1919
- Macrosiphum amurense Mordvilko, 1919
- Macrosiphum antesplenium Qiao & Zhang, 1998
- Macrosiphum atragenae Holman, 1980
- Macrosiphum audeni MacDougall, 1926
- Macrosiphum badium Jensen, 2000
- Macrosiphum bisensoriatum MacDougall, 1926
- Macrosiphum bupleuri Kadyrbekov, 2000
- Macrosiphum californicum (Clarke, 1903)
- Macrosiphum carpinicolens Patch, 1919
- Macrosiphum centranthi
- Macrosiphum cerinthiacum Börner, 1950
- Macrosiphum cholodkovskyi
- Macrosiphum chukotense Stekolshchikov & Khruleva, 2015
- Macrosiphum claytoniae Jensen, 2000
- Macrosiphum clematifoliae Shinji, 1924
- Macrosiphum clematophagum Zhang, Chen, Zhong & Li, 1999
- Macrosiphum clum Jensen, 2015
- Macrosiphum clydesmithi (Robinson, 1980)
- Macrosiphum constrictum Patch, 1923
- Macrosiphum corallorhizae (Cockerell, 1903)
- Macrosiphum coriariae (Shinji, 1922)
- Macrosiphum cornifoliae Shinji, 1923
- Macrosiphum corydalis (Oestlund, 1886)
- Macrosiphum coryli Davis, 1914
- Macrosiphum corylicola
- Macrosiphum creelii Davis, 1914
- Macrosiphum cyatheae (Holman, 1974)
- Macrosiphum cystopteris Robinson, 1966
- Macrosiphum daphnidis Börner, 1940
- Macrosiphum davisi
- Macrosiphum dewsler Jensen, 2017
- Macrosiphum dicentrae Jensen & Chan, 2009
- Macrosiphum diervillae Patch, 1919
- Macrosiphum doronicicola
- Macrosiphum dryopteridis (Holman, 1959)
- Macrosiphum dzhibladzeae Barjadze, 2010
- Macrosiphum eastopi Barjadze & Blackman, 2017
- Macrosiphum echinocysti Bartholomew, 1932
- Macrosiphum edrossi Essig, 1953
- Macrosiphum equiseti (Holman, 1961)
- Macrosiphum eupatorii (Williams, 1911)
- Macrosiphum euphorbiae (Thomas, 1878)
- Macrosiphum euphorbiellum
- Macrosiphum fagopyri Ghosh & Raychaudhuri, 1972
- Macrosiphum flavum Tao, 1963
- Macrosiphum floridae (Ashmead, 1882)
- Macrosiphum funestum (Macchiati, 1885)
- Macrosiphum fuscicornis MacDougall, 1926
- Macrosiphum garyreed Jensen, 2017
- Macrosiphum gaurae (Williams, 1911)
- Macrosiphum geranii (Oestlund, 1887)
- Macrosiphum githago Theobald, 1913
- Macrosiphum githargo Theobald, 1913
- Macrosiphum glawatz Jensen, 2020
- Macrosiphum hamiltoni (Robinson, 1968)
- Macrosiphum hartigi Hille Ris Lambers, 1947
- Macrosiphum helianthi (Tao, 1963)
- Macrosiphum hellebori
- Macrosiphum holmani
- Macrosiphum holodisci Jensen, 2000
- Macrosiphum impatientis (Williams, 1911)
- Macrosiphum inexspectatum Leclant, 1974
- Macrosiphum insularis (Pergande, 1900)
- Macrosiphum jasmini (Clarke, 1903)
- Macrosiphum jeanae (Robinson, 1972)
- Macrosiphum knautiae Holman, 1972
- Macrosiphum kuricola Matsumura, 1917
- Macrosiphum lambi (Robinson, 1980)
- Macrosiphum lapponicum
- Macrosiphum laseri Holman, 1962
- Macrosiphum lilii (Monell, 1880)
- Macrosiphum lisae Heie, 1965
- Macrosiphum longirostratum Jensen & Holman, 2000
- Macrosiphum malvicola Matsumura, 1917
- Macrosiphum meixneri Börner, 1950
- Macrosiphum melampyri Mordvilko, 1919
- Macrosiphum mentzeliae Wilson, 1915
- Macrosiphum mertensiae Gillette & Palmer, 1933
- Macrosiphum miho Jensen & Holman, 2000
- Macrosiphum minatii
- Macrosiphum mordvilkoi Miyazaki, 1968
- Macrosiphum multipilosum Nevsky, 1951
- Macrosiphum naazamiae
- Macrosiphum nasonovi Mordvilko, 1919
- Macrosiphum neavi Theobald, 1914
- Macrosiphum nevskyanum MacGillivray, 1958
- Macrosiphum occidentale (Essig, 1942)
- Macrosiphum olmsteadi Robinson, 1965
- Macrosiphum opportunisticum Jensen, 2012
- Macrosiphum oredonense Remaudière, 1952
- Macrosiphum oregonense Jensen, 2000
- Macrosiphum orthocarpus Davidson, 1909
- Macrosiphum osmaliae
- Macrosiphum osmaroniae (Wilson, 1912)
- Macrosiphum pachysiphon Hille Ris Lambers, 1966
- Macrosiphum paektusani Lee & Havelka, 2009
- Macrosiphum pallens Hottes & Frison, 1931
- Macrosiphum pallidum (Oestlund, 1887)
- Macrosiphum parvifolii Richards, 1967
- Macrosiphum pechumani MacGillivray, 1966
- Macrosiphum penfroense
- Macrosiphum perillae (Zhang, 1988)
- Macrosiphum petasitis Matsumura, 1917
- Macrosiphum polanense
- Macrosiphum potentillae (Oestlund, 1887)
- Macrosiphum prenanthidis Börner, 1940
- Macrosiphum pseudocoryli Patch, 1919
- Macrosiphum pseudogeranii Chakrabarti & Raychaudhuri, 1974
- Macrosiphum ptericolens Patch, 1919
- Macrosiphum pteridis Wilson, 1915
- Macrosiphum pulcherimum Nevsky, 1928
- Macrosiphum purshiae Palmer, 1938
- Macrosiphum pyrifoliae MacDougall, 1926
- Macrosiphum ranunculi
- Macrosiphum raysmithi Hille Ris Lambers, 1966
- Macrosiphum rebecae Jensen & Holman, 2000
- Macrosiphum rhamni (Clarke, 1903)
- Macrosiphum rosae (Linnaeus, 1758)
- Macrosiphum rubiarctici Heikenheimo, 1946
- Macrosiphum rudbeckiarum (Cockerell, 1903)
- Macrosiphum salviae Bartholomew, 1932
- Macrosiphum schimmelum Jensen, 2015
- Macrosiphum skurichinae Remaudière & Remaudière, 1997
- Macrosiphum solutum Blanchard, 1939
- Macrosiphum sorbi Matsumura, 1918
- Macrosiphum spec (Theobald, 1915)
- Macrosiphum stanleyi Wilson, 1915
- Macrosiphum stellariae Theobald, 1913
- Macrosiphum suguri Shinji, 1924
- Macrosiphum symphyti Barjadze & Chakvetadze, 2008
- Macrosiphum tadecola
- Macrosiphum tenuicauda Bartholomew, 1932
- Macrosiphum tiliae (Monell, 1879)
- Macrosiphum timpanogos Knowlton, 1942
- Macrosiphum tinctum (Walker, 1849)
- Macrosiphum tolmiea (Essig, 1942)
- Macrosiphum tonantzin Peña-Martinez, Muñoz Viveros & Jensen, 2019
- Macrosiphum trollii Börner, 1950
- Macrosiphum tsutae
- Macrosiphum tuberculaceps (Essig, 1942)
- Macrosiphum valerianae (Clarke, 1903)
- Macrosiphum vancouveriae Jensen, 2000
- Macrosiphum vandenboschi (Hille Ris Lambers, 1966)
- Macrosiphum venaefuscae Davis, 1914
- Macrosiphum verbenae (Thomas, 1878)
- Macrosiphum vereshtshagini Mordvilko, 1919
- Macrosiphum violae Jensen, 2000
- Macrosiphum walkeri (Robinson, 1980)
- Macrosiphum weberi Börner, 1933
- Macrosiphum willamettense Jensen, 2000
- Macrosiphum wilsoni Jensen, 2000
- Macrosiphum woodsiae (Robinson, 1980)
- Macrosiphum yomogi
- Macrosiphum zionense Knowlton, 1935
