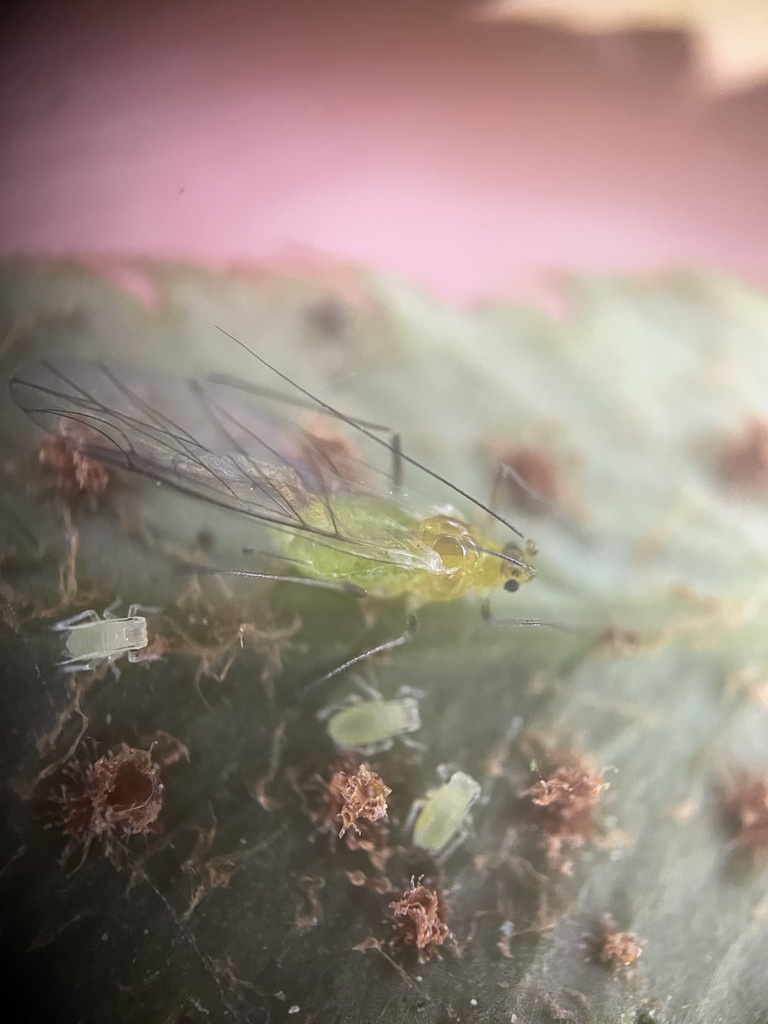

Scientific classification
- Kingdom: Animalia
- Phylum: Arthropoda
- Class: Insecta
- Order: Hemiptera
- Suborder: Sternorrhyncha
- Family: Aphididae
- Genus: Macrosiphum
- Species: M. walkeri

Binomial name
- Macrosiphum walkeri Robinson, 1980

= Macrosiphum walkeri =

Species of aphid

Macrosiphum walkeri is a yellow, green, pink or red colored aphid in the genus Macrosiphum that is endemic to the Western United States.

The main two host plants of this aphid are the various species of west coast ferns, with a preference for the western sword fern and oceanspray. The species is known to switch between food plants.

The first georeferenced records with photos on the internet were taken by the user sageost via iNaturalist.

The Global Biodiversity Information Facility includes multiple dead specimens plus sageost's contributions that are georeferenced.
