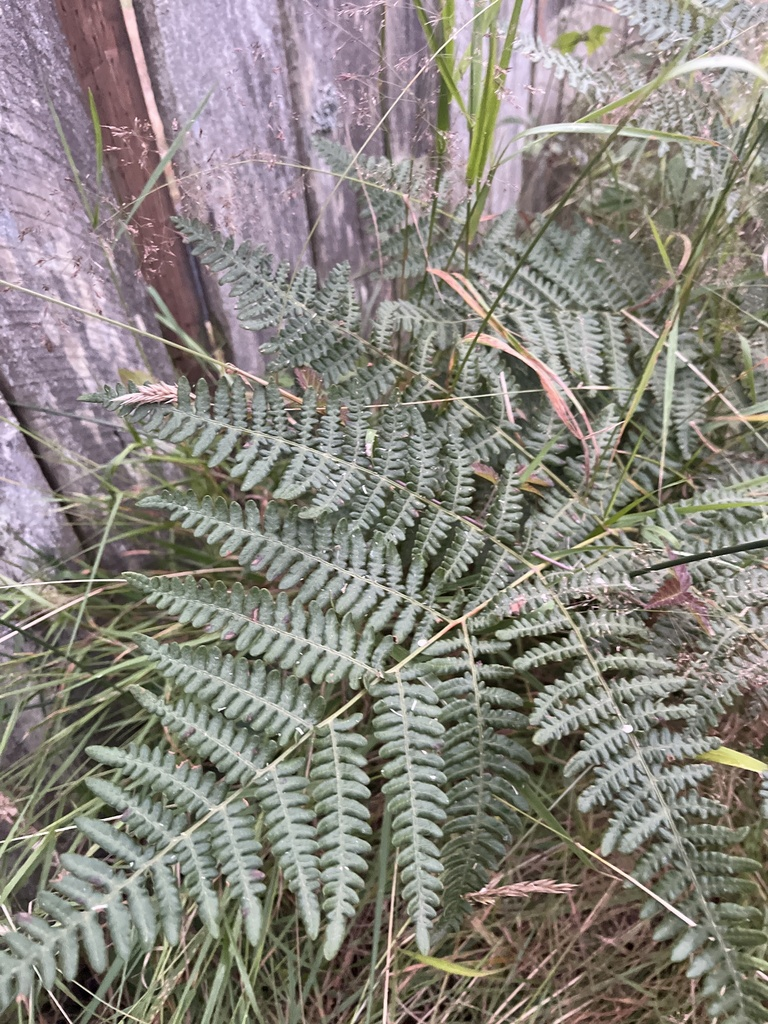

Scientific classification
- Kingdom: Plantae
- Clade: Tracheophytes
- Division: Polypodiophyta
- Class: Polypodiopsida
- Order: Polypodiales
- Family: Dennstaedtiaceae
- Genus: Pteridium
- Species: P. aquilinum
- Variety: P. a. var. pubescens

Trinomial name
- Pteridium aquilinum var. pubescens Underw.

= Pteridium aquilinum var. pubescens =

Variety of fern

Pteridium aquilinum var. pubescens, commonly known as the hairy bracken or western bracken, is a variety of bracken fern ranging from Alaska to Mexico. This plant is a variety of Pteridium aquilinum, a predominantly European species.

== Habitat ==
Pteridium aquilinum var. pubescens grows across the Pacific Northwest of the United States and is common across its range in meadows, pastures, woodlands and hillsides.

This species is also one of the few species of ferns that has been observed breaking through concrete paved above the plant. This means they can potentially cause damage when new paving is put in over a population.

== Description ==
Pteridium aquilinum var. pubescens can be identified by its small hairs on its stems and leaves, new growth, hirsute spores, and a lack of scales on the fronds.

Maturing fiddleheads have dusky reddish brown hairs and are light green in overall coloration before assuming their dark green mature leaf coloration. These hairs stay on the fern even after the leaf dies, therefore making identification of ferns that have already died back possible.

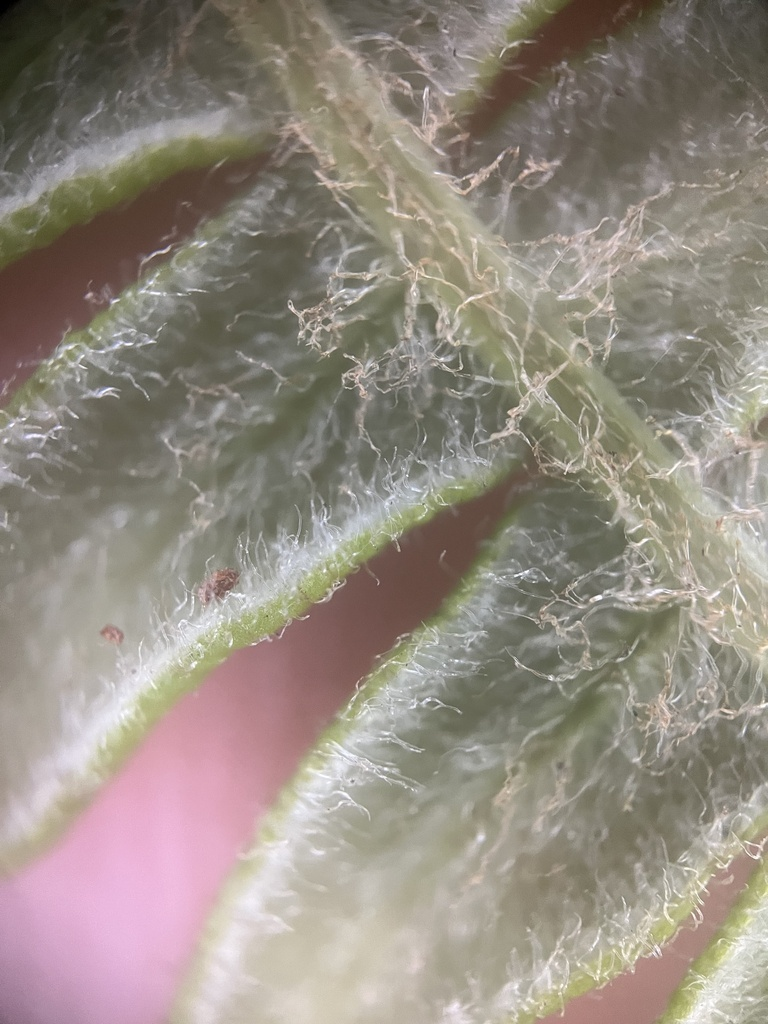
Hairy brackenfern under a macro lens, taken on SE Cedar Ridge Dr, Renton, Washington

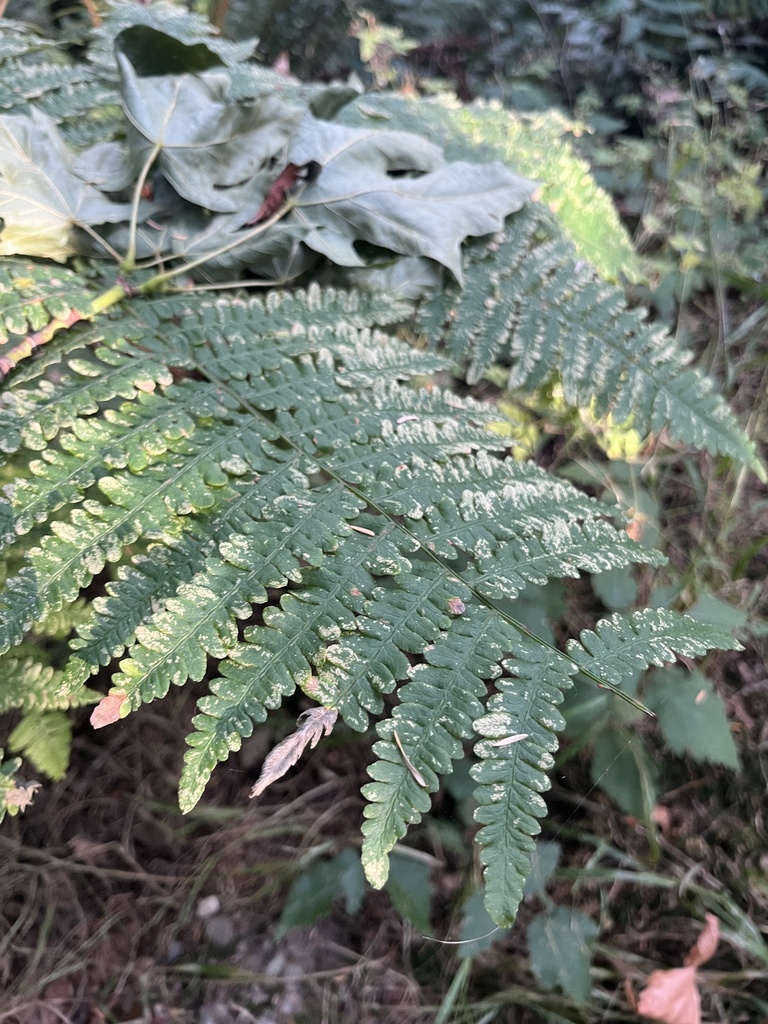
A faded specimen of hairy brackenfern found in Issaquah, Washington

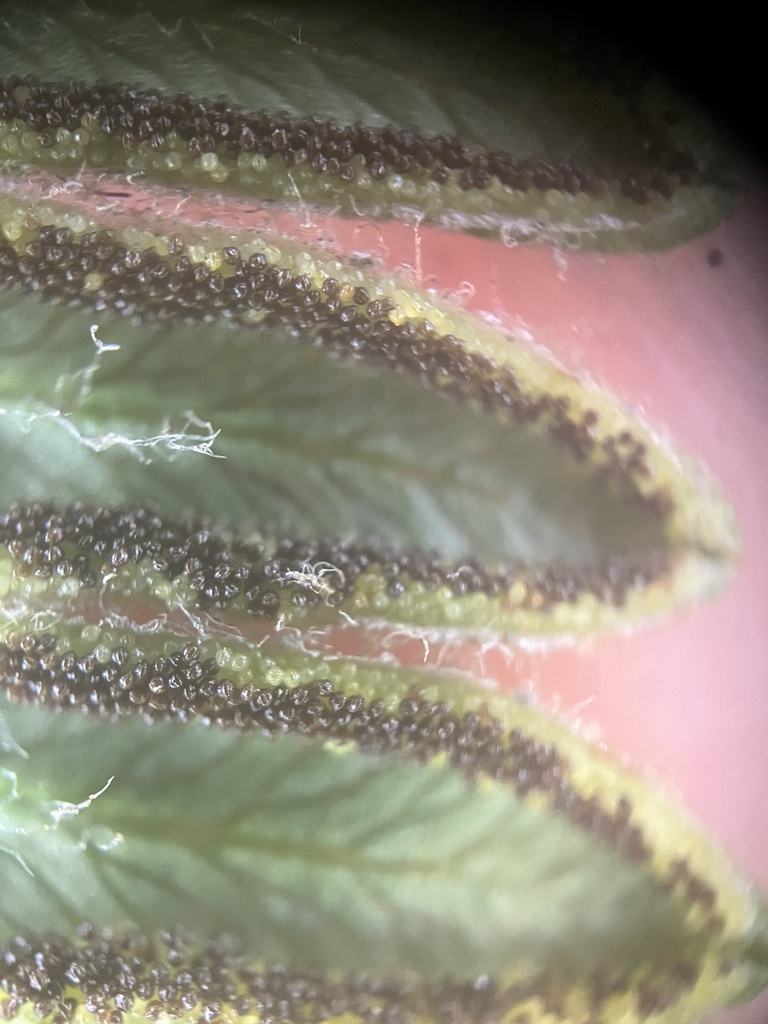
An example of hairy brackenfern with spores taken in Moclips, Washington

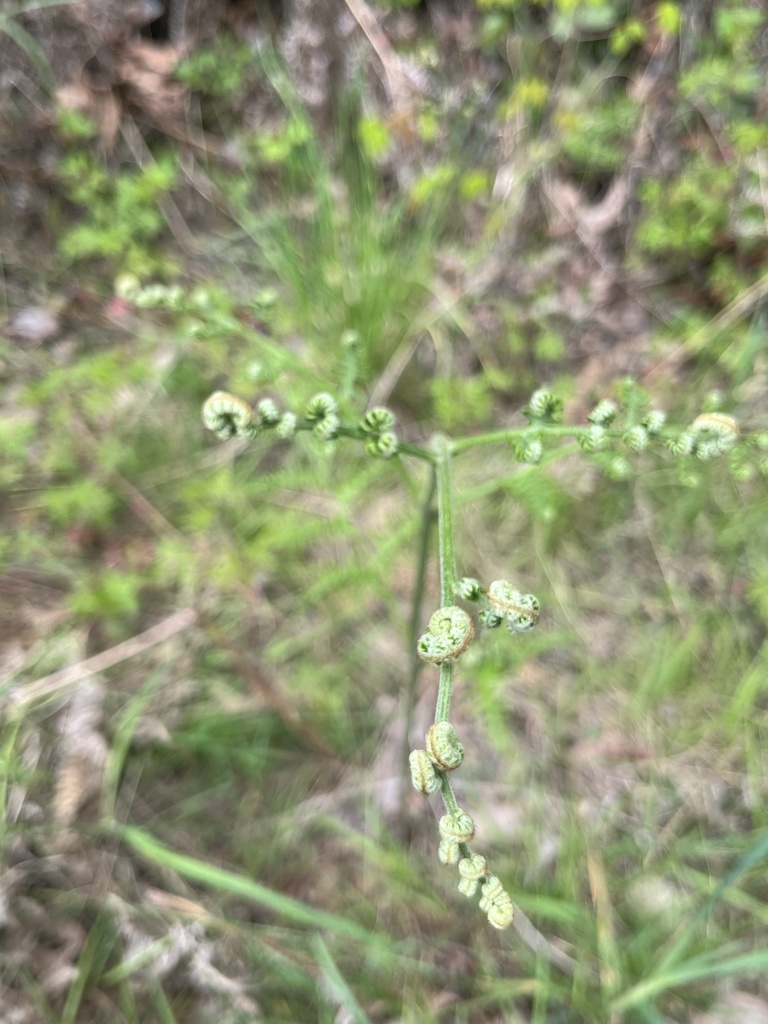
Example of a hairy brackenfern at early maturity

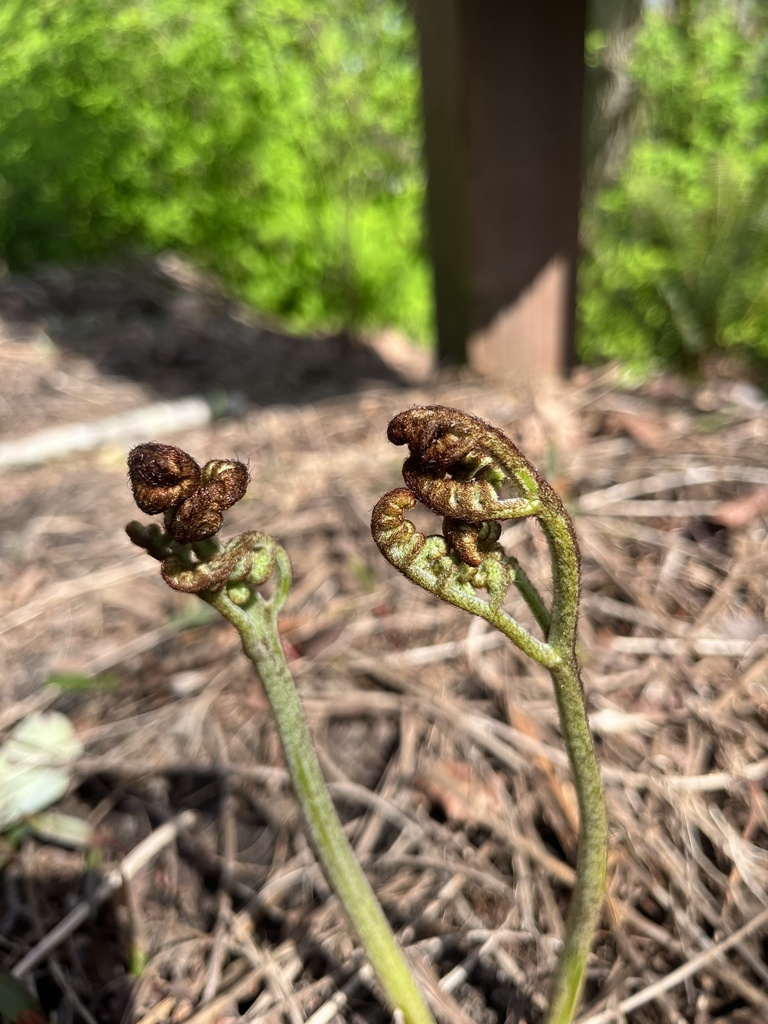
Hairy brackenfern with its hairy early growth taken at Frink Park in Seattle

== Host associations ==
Macrosiphum rhamni uses this variety of fern as its dominant host plant.
