= Cornicle =

Tubes found on the dorsal side of aphids

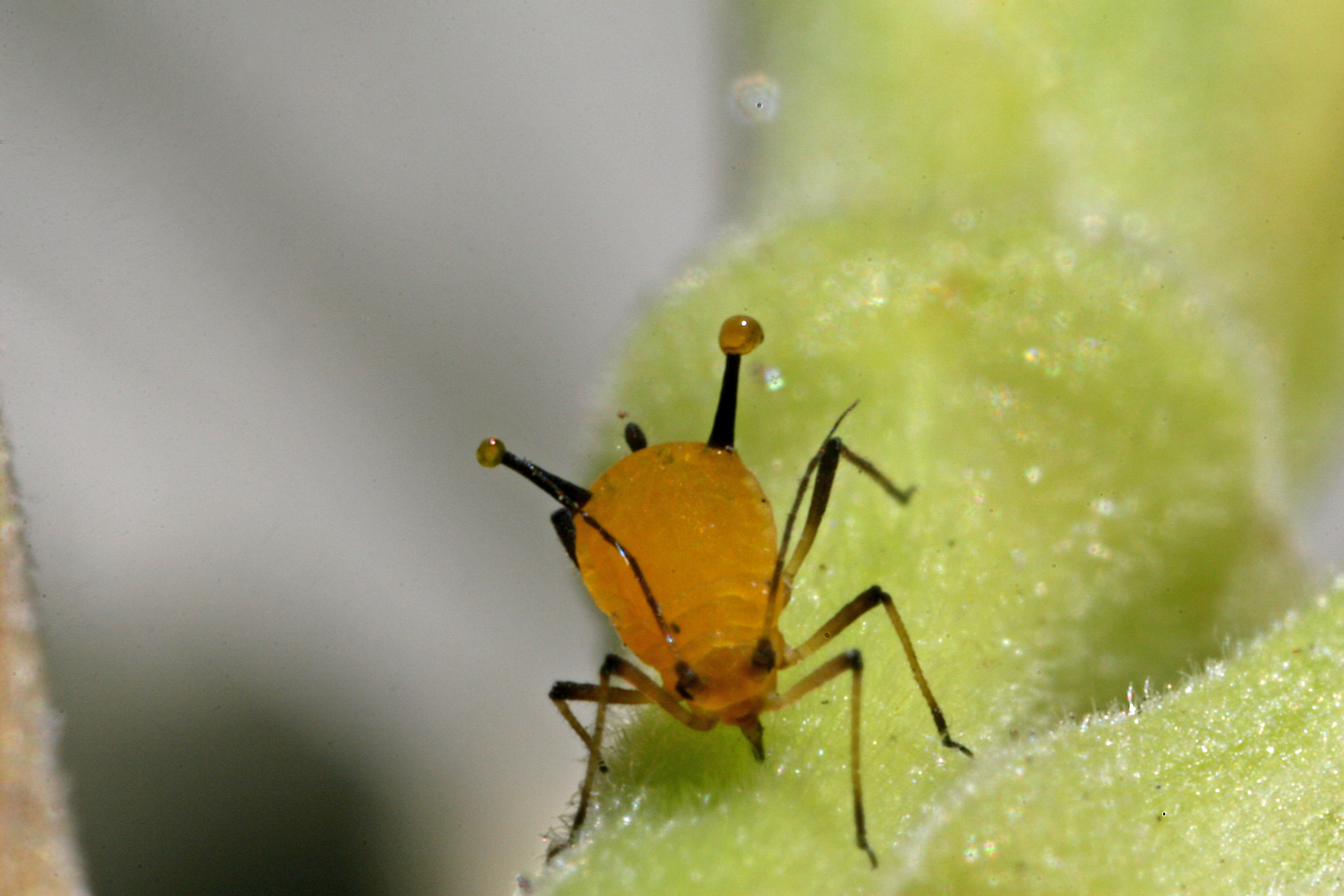
Aphid excreting defensive fluid from the cornicles

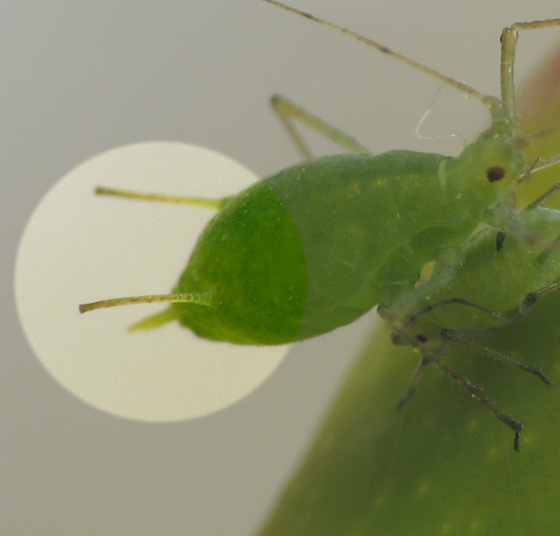
Cornicles

The cornicle (or siphuncule) is one of a pair of structures on the dorsal side of the sixth abdominal segments of aphids. Siphunculi may consist of cylinders, cones or mere pores, and some species lack them. The surface of siphunculi may have reticulations or polygons (these are two distinct textures), and occasionally setae are present. They are sometimes mistaken for cerci.

These abdominal tubes exude droplets of a quick-hardening defensive fluid containing triacylglycerols called cornicle wax. There is some confusion in the literature about the function of the cornicle wax secretions. It was common at one time to suggest that the cornicles were the source of the honeydew, and this was even included in the Shorter Oxford English Dictionary and the 2008 edition of the World Book Encyclopedia. There also is documentation in the literature for cornicle wax luring predators in some cases.
