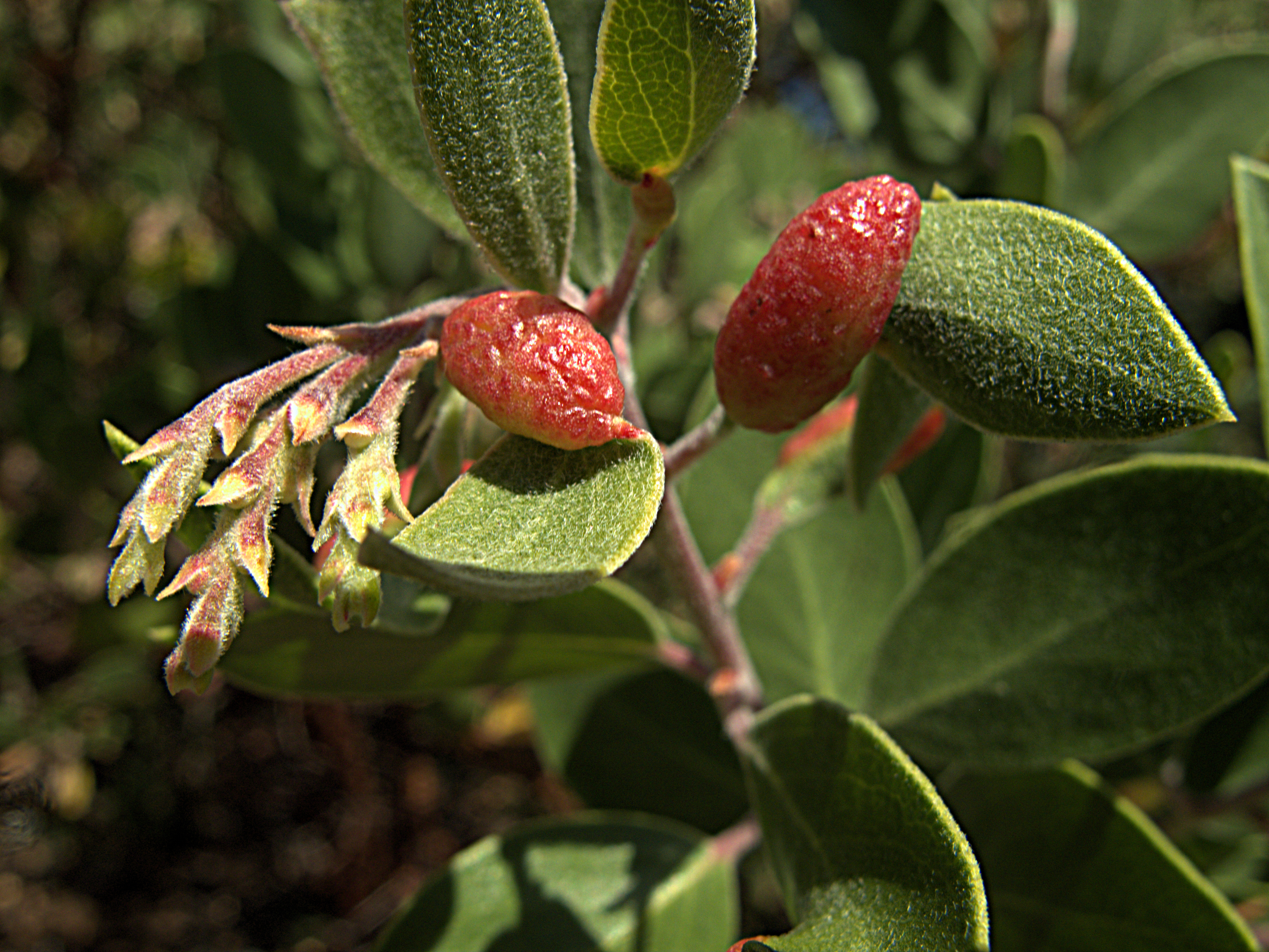
- Tamalia coweni, Manzanita leaf gall aphid

Scientific classification
- Domain: Eukaryota
- Kingdom: Animalia
- Phylum: Arthropoda
- Class: Insecta
- Order: Hemiptera
- Suborder: Sternorrhyncha
- Family: Aphididae
- Genus: Tamalia
- Species: T. coweni

Binomial name
- Tamalia coweni (Cockerell, 1905)

= Tamalia coweni =

Species of true bug

Tamalia coweni, also known as the manzanita leaf gall aphid and the fold-gall aphid, is a species of aphid in the family Aphididae. Tamalia coweni induces galls on most species of glabrous manzanita tree. This aphid actually induces two types of galls: a midrib or margin leaf gall, and a less common inflorescence gall.

Tamalia coweni is common on the Pacific coast of North America and east to Nevada and Colorado. Tamalia inquilina, an inquiline of this species, is found in the Californias. Recently described species Tamalia glaucensis induces leaf galls on big-berry manzanita specifically.
