= Neophyllaphis podocarpi =

Scientific classification
- Domain: Eukaryota
- Kingdom: Animalia
- Phylum: Arthropoda
- Class: Insecta
- Order: Hemiptera
- Suborder: Sternorrhyncha
- Family: Aphididae
- Genus: Neophyllaphis
- Species: N. podocarpi

Binomial name
- Neophyllaphis podocarpi Takahashi, 1920

Species of true bug

Neophyllaphis podocarpi, the podocarpus aphid, is a species of aphid in the family Aphididae.
