= Neophyllaphis =

Scientific classification
- Domain: Eukaryota
- Kingdom: Animalia
- Phylum: Arthropoda
- Class: Insecta
- Order: Hemiptera
- Suborder: Sternorrhyncha
- Family: Aphididae
- Subfamily: Neophyllaphidinae
- Genus: Neophyllaphis; Takahashi, 1920

Genus of true bugs

Neophyllaphis is a genus of aphids in the family Aphididae. There are about 18 described species in Neophyllaphis.

== Species ==
These 18 species belong to the genus Neophyllaphis:

- Neophyllaphis araucariae Takahashi, 1937
- Neophyllaphis brimblecombei Carver, 1971
- Neophyllaphis burostris Qiao & Zhang, 2001
- Neophyllaphis cuschensis Nieto Nafría & Delfino, 2008
- Neophyllaphis fransseni Hille Ris Lambers, 1967
- Neophyllaphis gingerensis Carver, 1959
- Neophyllaphis grobleri Eastop, 1955
- Neophyllaphis iuiuyensis Mier Durante & Ortego, 2008
- Neophyllaphis lanata Hales & Lardner, 1988
- Neophyllaphis michelbacheri (Essig, 1953)
- Neophyllaphis podocarpi Takahashi, 1920 (podocarpus aphid)
- Neophyllaphis podocarpini Carrillo, 1980
- Neophyllaphis propinqua Quednau, 2010
- Neophyllaphis pueblohondensis Quednau, 2010
- Neophyllaphis rappardi Hille Ris Lambers, 1967
- Neophyllaphis totarae Cottier, 1953
- Neophyllaphis varicolor Miller & Halbert, 2014
- Neophyllaphis viridis Ilharco, 1973
