= Sitobion miscanthi =

Indian grain aphid

Scientific classification
- Kingdom: Animalia
- Phylum: Arthropoda
- Clade: Pancrustacea
- Class: Insecta
- Order: Hemiptera
- Suborder: Sternorrhyncha
- Family: Aphididae
- Genus: Sitobion
- Species: S. miscanthi

Binomial name
- Sitobion miscanthi (Takahashi, 1921)

Synonyms
- Macrosiphum eleusines Theobald, 1929; Macrosiphum miscanthi Takahashi, 1921; Sitobion eleusines Theobald, 1929

Species of true bug

The Indian grain aphid (Sitobion miscanthi), also known as Sitobion (Sitobion) miscanthi, is an aphid in the superfamily Aphidoidea in the order Hemiptera. It is a true bug and sucks sap from cereal plants, making it a pest of wheat production. It has also been recorded as a pest of finger millet, sorghum, and pearl millet in South Asia.

A high-quality draft of the S. miscanthi genome 377.19 Mb in size was sequenced to help promote research on the lifestyle and feeding specificity of aphids and their interactions with each other and species at other trophic levels.

== External sources ==
- http://www.cabi.org/isc/datasheet/51740
- http://animaldiversity.org/accounts/Sitobion_miscanthi/classification/
- http://www.plantwise.org/KnowledgeBank/Datasheet.aspx?dsid=51740
