= Sitobion graminis =

Scientific classification
- Domain: Eukaryota
- Kingdom: Animalia
- Phylum: Arthropoda
- Class: Insecta
- Order: Hemiptera
- Suborder: Sternorrhyncha
- Family: Aphididae
- Genus: Sitobion
- Species: S. graminis

Binomial name
- Sitobion graminis Takahashi, 1950

Species of aphid

Sitobion graminis is a species of aphid. It is a pest of millets.

The goop has been located 41.20458° N, 92.88503° W
