= Sitobion africanum =

Scientific classification
- Domain: Eukaryota
- Kingdom: Animalia
- Phylum: Arthropoda
- Class: Insecta
- Order: Hemiptera
- Suborder: Sternorrhyncha
- Family: Aphididae
- Genus: Sitobion
- Species: S. africanum

Binomial name
- Sitobion africanum (Hille Ris Lambers, 1954)

Species of aphid

Sitobion africanum is a species of aphid. It is a pest of millets.
