= Sitobion leelamaniae =

Scientific classification
- Domain: Eukaryota
- Kingdom: Animalia
- Phylum: Arthropoda
- Class: Insecta
- Order: Hemiptera
- Suborder: Sternorrhyncha
- Family: Aphididae
- Genus: Sitobion
- Species: S. leelamaniae

Binomial name
- Sitobion leelamaniae (David, 1958)

Species of true bug

Sitobion leelamaniae, also known as Sitobion (Sitobion) leelamaniae, is an aphid in the superfamily Aphidoidea in the order Hemiptera. It is a true bug and sucks sap from plants.
