= Sitobion wikstroemiae =

Scientific classification
- Kingdom: Animalia
- Phylum: Arthropoda
- Class: Insecta
- Order: Hemiptera
- Suborder: Sternorrhyncha
- Family: Aphididae
- Genus: Sitobion
- Species: S. wikstroemiae

Binomial name
- Sitobion wikstroemiae (Marmet)

Species of true bug

Sitobion wikstroemiae, also known as Sitobion (Sitobion) wikstroemiae, is an aphid in the superfamily Aphidoidea in the order Hemiptera. It is a true bug and sucks sap from plants.
