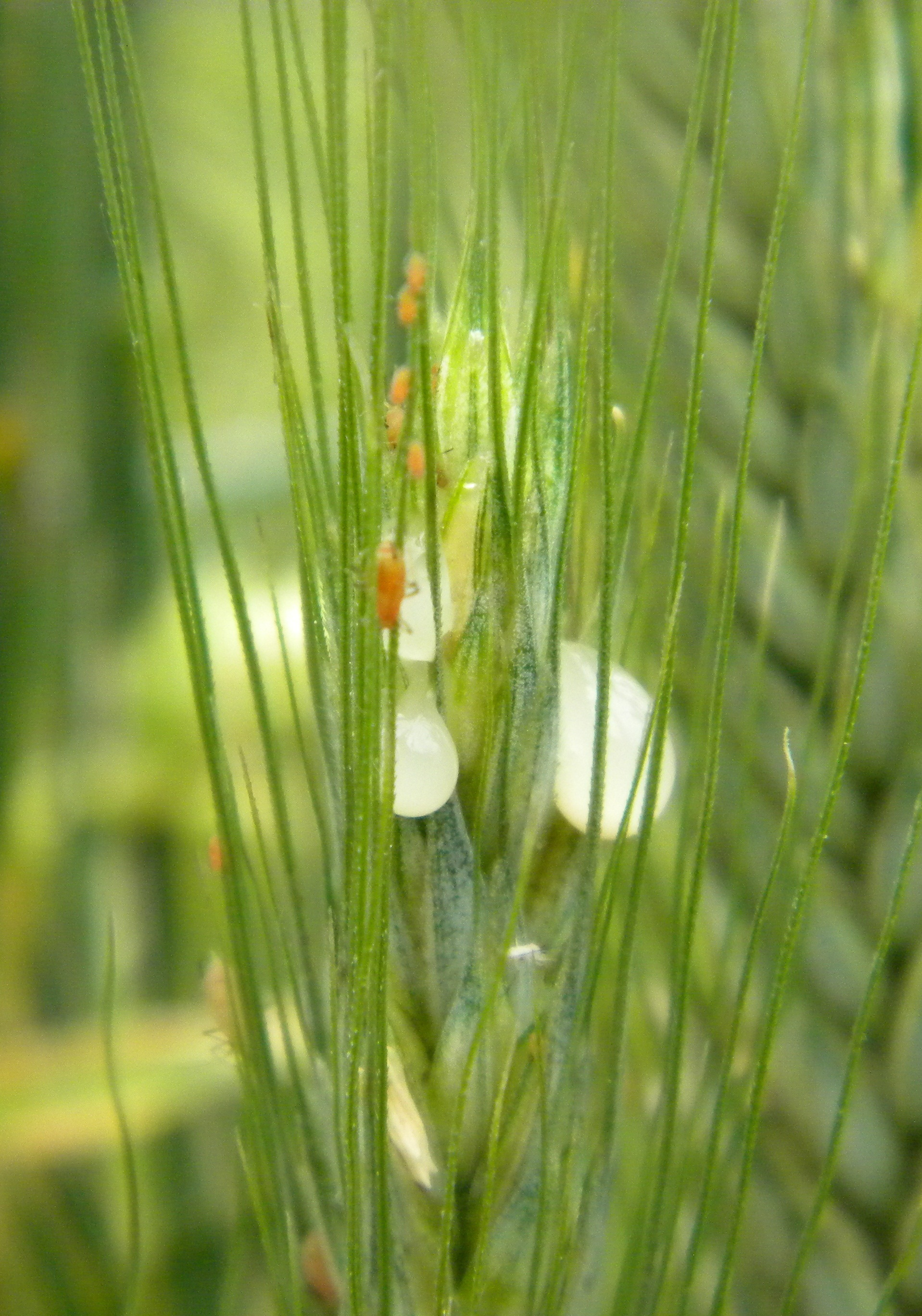
- Sitobio avenae

Scientific classification
- Domain: Eukaryota
- Kingdom: Animalia
- Phylum: Arthropoda
- Class: Insecta
- Order: Hemiptera
- Suborder: Sternorrhyncha
- Family: Aphididae
- Subfamily: Aphidinae
- Tribe: Macrosiphini
- Genus: Sitobion; Mordvilko, 1914

= Sitobion =

Genus of true bugs

Sitobion is a genus of aphids in the family Aphididae. There are more than 80 described species in Sitobion.

== Species ==
These 81 species belong to the genus Sitobion:

- Sitobion africanum (Hille Ris Lambers, 1954)
- Sitobion alopecuri (Takahashi, 1921)
- Sitobion anselliae (Hall, 1932)
- Sitobion asirum Aldryhim & Ilharco, 1996
- Sitobion aulacorthoides (David, Narayanan & Rajasingh, 1971)
- Sitobion autriquei Remaudière, 1985
- Sitobion avenae (Fabricius, 1775) (English grain aphid)
- Sitobion bambusicola
- Sitobion bamendae (Eastop, 1959)
- Sitobion beiquei (Hille Ris Lambers, 1960)
- Sitobion berchemiae
- Sitobion berkemiae (Shinji, 1941)
- Sitobion brevirostre (Heikenheimo, 1978)
- Sitobion breymiae Noordam, 2004
- Sitobion burundiense Remaudière, 1985
- Sitobion calvulum
- Sitobion caricis (Glendenning, 1926)
- Sitobion cissi (Theobald, 1920)
- Sitobion colei (Eastop, 1959)
- Sitobion congolense (Doncaster & Hille Ris Lambers, 1956)
- Sitobion cuscutae (Holman, 1974)
- Sitobion dismilaceti (Zhang, 1980)
- Sitobion eulophiae Remaudière, 1985
- Sitobion fragariae (Walker, 1848)
- Sitobion graminearum (Mordvilko, 1919)
- Sitobion graminis Takahashi, 1950
- Sitobion gravelii (van der Goot, 1917)
- Sitobion halli (Eastop, 1959)
- Sitobion hillerislambersi van Harten, 1979
- Sitobion himalayensis
- Sitobion hirsutirostris (Eastop, 1959)
- Sitobion ibarae (Matsumura, 1917)
- Sitobion indicum Basu, 1964
- Sitobion isodonis Sorin, 1979
- Sitobion kamtshaticum (Mordvilko, 1919)
- Sitobion krahi (Eastop, 1959)
- Sitobion kurimahala van Harten, 1990
- Sitobion lambersi David, 1956
- Sitobion leelamaniae (David, 1958)
- Sitobion leonidasi Remaudière, 1985
- Sitobion loranthi
- Sitobion luteum (Buckton, 1876) (orchid aphid)
- Sitobion manitobense (Robinson, 1965)
- Sitobion martorelli (Smith, 1960)
- Sitobion matatum (Eastop, 1959)
- Sitobion mesosphaeri (Tissot, 1934)
- Sitobion microspinulosum (David, Rajasingh & Narayanan, 1972)
- Sitobion milii Remaudière, 1985
- Sitobion mimosae
- Sitobion miscanthi (Takahashi, 1921)
- Sitobion mucatha (Eastop, 1955)
- Sitobion neusi
- Sitobion nigeriense (Eastop, 1959)
- Sitobion nigrinectarium (Theobald, 1915)
- Sitobion niwanistum (Hottes, 1933)
- Sitobion ochnearum (Eastop, 1959)
- Sitobion orchidacearum
- Sitobion paludum F.P.Muller, 1982
- Sitobion papillatum Remaudière, 1985
- Sitobion pauliani Remaudière, 1957
- Sitobion phyllanthi (Takahashi, 1937)
- Sitobion plectranthi (Ghosh, Ghosh & Raychaudhuri, 1971)
- Sitobion pseudoalupecuri
- Sitobion pseudoluteum
- Sitobion qinghaiense (Zhang, Chen, Zhong & Li, 1999)
- Sitobion raoi
- Sitobion rosaeiformis (Das, 1918)
- Sitobion rosivorum (Zhang, 1980)
- Sitobion scabripes Ghosh, 1972
- Sitobion schoelli
- Sitobion scoticum (Stroyan, 1969)
- Sitobion sikkimense (Ghosh & Raychaudhuri, 1968)
- Sitobion smilacicola (Takahashi, 1924)
- Sitobion smilacifoliae (Takahashi, 1921)
- Sitobion takahashii (Eastop, 1959)
- Sitobion thalictri Remaudière, 1985
- Sitobion triumfettae Remaudière, 1985
- Sitobion wikstroemiae
- Sitobion yakini (Eastop, 1959)
- Sitobion yasumatsui
- Sitobion yongyooti (Robinson, 1972)
