= Aiceona =

Scientific classification
- Kingdom: Animalia
- Phylum: Arthropoda
- Class: Insecta
- Order: Hemiptera
- Suborder: Sternorrhyncha
- Family: Aphididae
- Subfamily: Aiceoninae; Nieto Nafría, Mier Durante & Remaudière, 1997
- Genus: Aiceona; Takahashi, 1921

Synonyms
- Aiceonidae, Aiceonini

Genus of aphids

Aiceona is the only genus in Aiceoninae: a monotypic subfamily of aphids.

Species in the genus include:

- Aiceona actinodaphnis Takahashi, 1921
- Aiceona himalaica Miyazaki, 1977
- Aiceona japonica Takahashi, 1960
- Aiceona longifestuca Qiao & Zhang, 2002
- Aiceona longisetosa Ghosh & Raychaudhuri, 1973
- Aiceona malayana Takahashi, 1960
- Aiceona manipurensis
- Aiceona osugii Takahashi, 1924
- Aiceona pallida Ghosh & Raychaudhuri, 1972
- Aiceona paraosugii Ghosh, Ghosh & Raychaudhuri, 1971
- Aiceona parvicornis Miyazaki, 1977
- Aiceona pseudosugii David, Sekhon & Bindra, 1970
- Aiceona retipennis David, Narayanan & Rajasingh, 1971
- Aiceona robustiseta Ghosh & Raychaudhuri, 1973
- Aiceona sexiarticulata (Zhang, 1998)
- Aiceona siamensis
- Aiceona tanakai Takahashi, 1963
- Aiceona titabarensis (Raychaudhuri & Ghosh, 1964)
