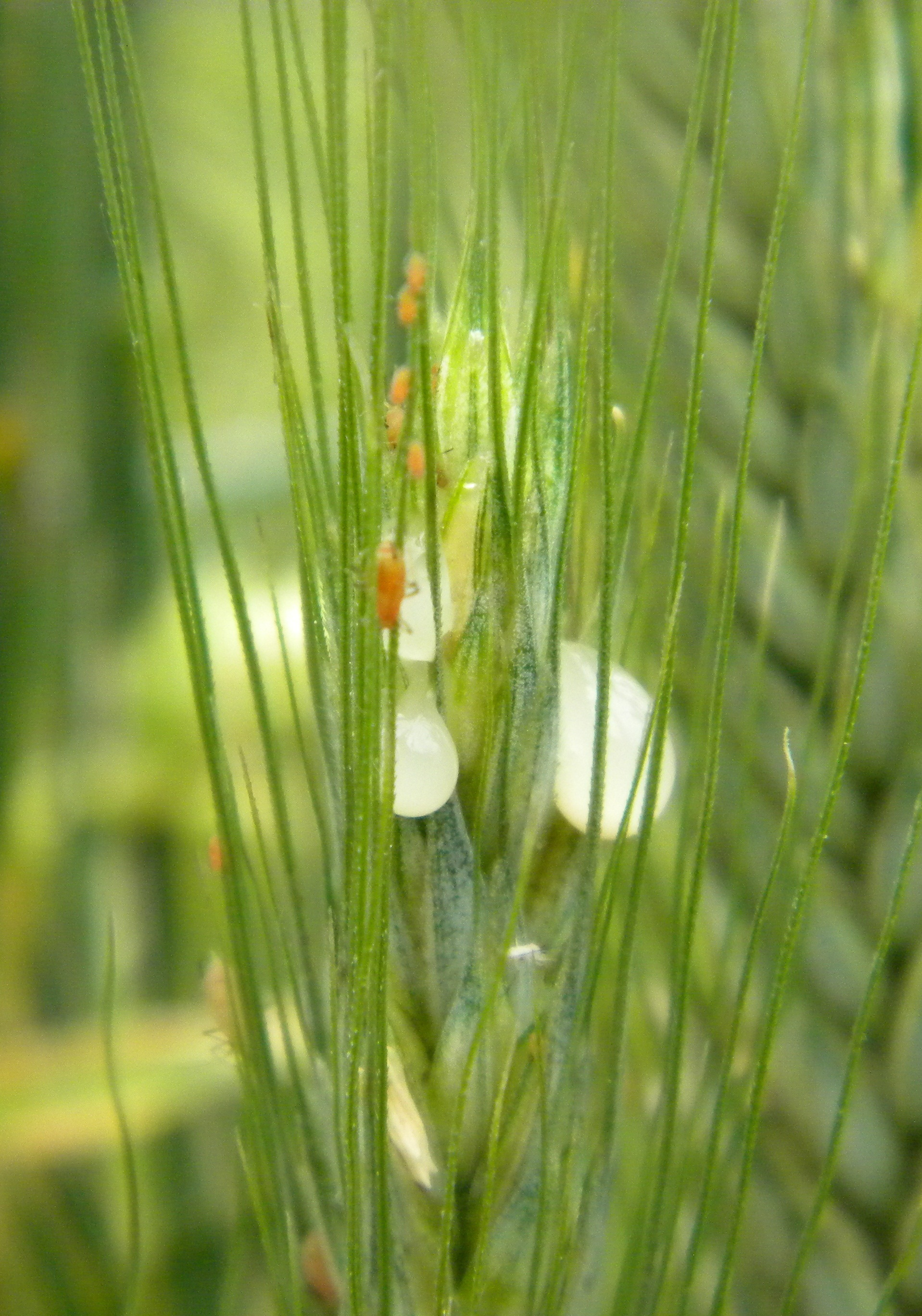

Scientific classification
- Kingdom: Animalia
- Phylum: Arthropoda
- Clade: Pancrustacea
- Class: Insecta
- Order: Hemiptera
- Suborder: Sternorrhyncha
- Family: Aphididae
- Genus: Sitobion
- Species: S. avenae

Binomial name
- Sitobion avenae Fabricius

= Sitobion avenae =

English Grain Aphid

Species of true bug

Sitobion avenae, the English grain aphid, is an aphid in the superfamily Aphidoidea in the order Hemiptera. It is a true bug and sucks sap from plants. It lives on grasses, sedge and rushes and can be a significant pest of cereals.

This species act as a host of the entomophthoralean fungi.

== Parthenogenesis ==
Some genotypes of S avenae are obligate parthenogens and some are cyclical parthenogens. Cyclically parthenogenetic lines can reproduce parthenogenetically in the spring and summer. Production of sexual females and males is induced during autumn by decreasing day length and decreasing temperature. Mating followed by egg laying occurs on grasses (Poaceae) during late November. Eggs can overwinter with delayed development (diapause), and then, after being exposed to cold for two or three months, can hatch spontaneously and initiate the next cycle of clonal reproduction.

== Genomics ==
A chromosome-level genome assembly of the English grain aphid (Sitobion avenae) was published in 2026. The genome size is approximately 525 Mb, with the assembly anchored to 6 chromosomes. The assembly has a BUSCO completeness of 98.6%, and 15,326 protein-coding genes were predicted.
