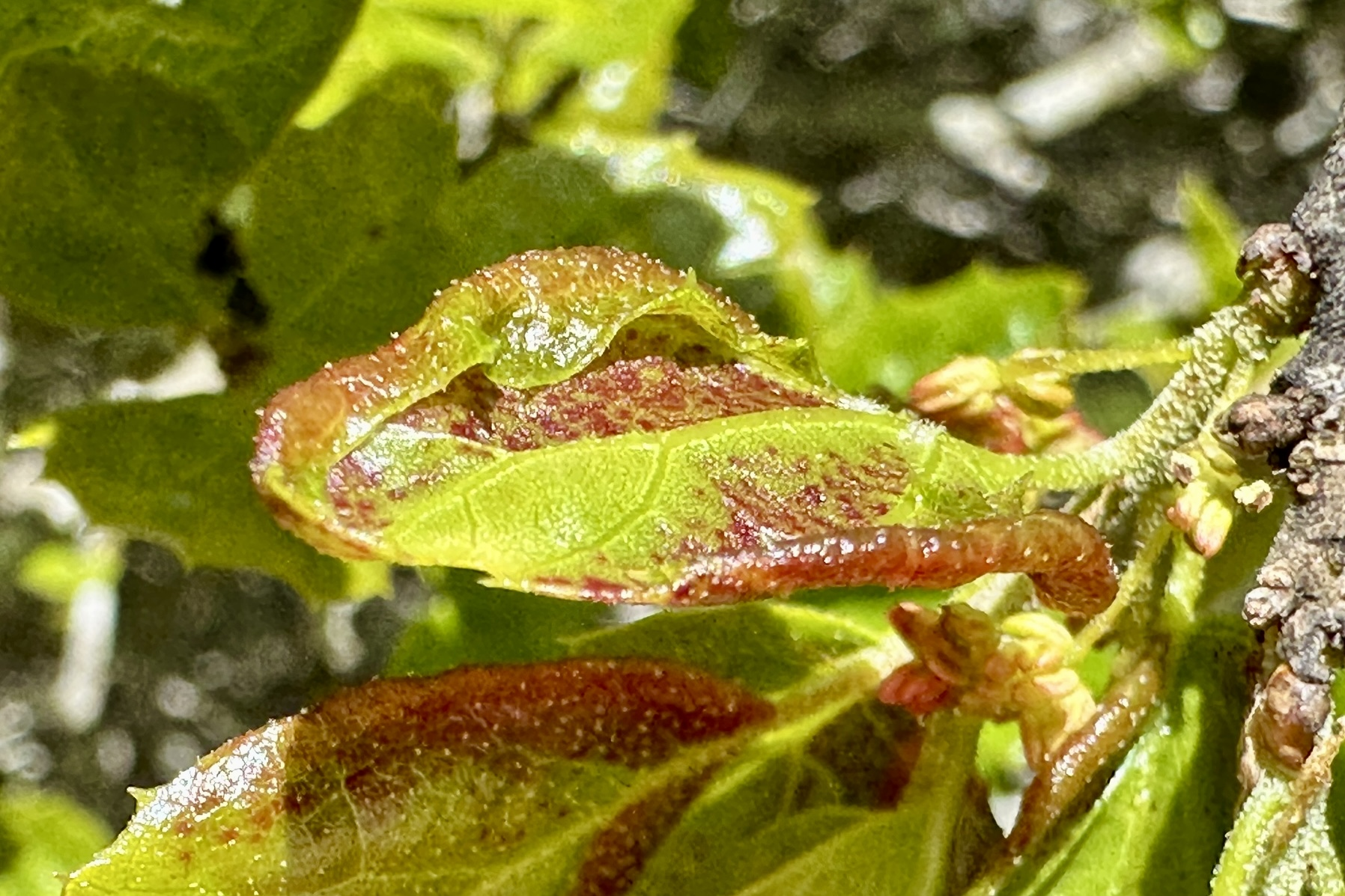
- California woolly oak aphid symptoms photographed at Fort Ord National Monument, by California biologist Henrik Kibak, 2023

Scientific classification
- Kingdom: Animalia
- Phylum: Arthropoda
- Class: Insecta
- Order: Hemiptera
- Suborder: Sternorrhyncha
- Family: Aphididae
- Genus: Stegophylla
- Species: S. essigi

Binomial name
- Stegophylla essigi Hille Ris Lambers, 1966

= Stegophylla essigi =

Species of treehopper

Stegophylla essigi, also known as the California woolly oak aphid, is a species of North American aphid. It had been found on many California oaks, including blue oaks, valley oaks, Oregon white oaks, coast live oaks, interior live oaks, California black oaks, and scrub oaks.

Woolly oak aphids overwinter as eggs. Several generations develop each year. In the spring, females reproduce parthenogenically (without mating). In the fall, male and female aphids are produced. Adult males may be either winged or wingless. For S. essigi, oviparae and both wingless and winged males are produced in November. Populations of S. essigi may continue to reproduce parthenogenically on evergreen oaks such as coast live oak, especially in leaves tied together by caterpillar silk. A visible sign of the presence of California woolly oak aphid is oak leaf margins that are folded upward and become reddish.
