= Stegophylla =

Scientific classification
- Domain: Eukaryota
- Kingdom: Animalia
- Phylum: Arthropoda
- Class: Insecta
- Order: Hemiptera
- Suborder: Sternorrhyncha
- Family: Aphididae
- Subfamily: Phyllaphidinae
- Genus: Stegophylla; Oestlund, 1923

Genus of aphids

Stegophylla is a genus of aphids in the subfamily Phyllaphidinae. This genus was first described by entomologist Oscar W. Oestlund in 1923.

== Species ==
- Stegophylla brevirostris Quednau, 2010
- Stegophylla davisi Quednau, 2010
- Stegophylla essigi Hille Ris Lambers, 1966
- Stegophylla mugnozae Remaudière & Quednau, 1985
- Stegophylla quercicola
- Stegophylla quercifoliae (Gillette, 1914)
- Stegophylla quercina Quednau, 1966
