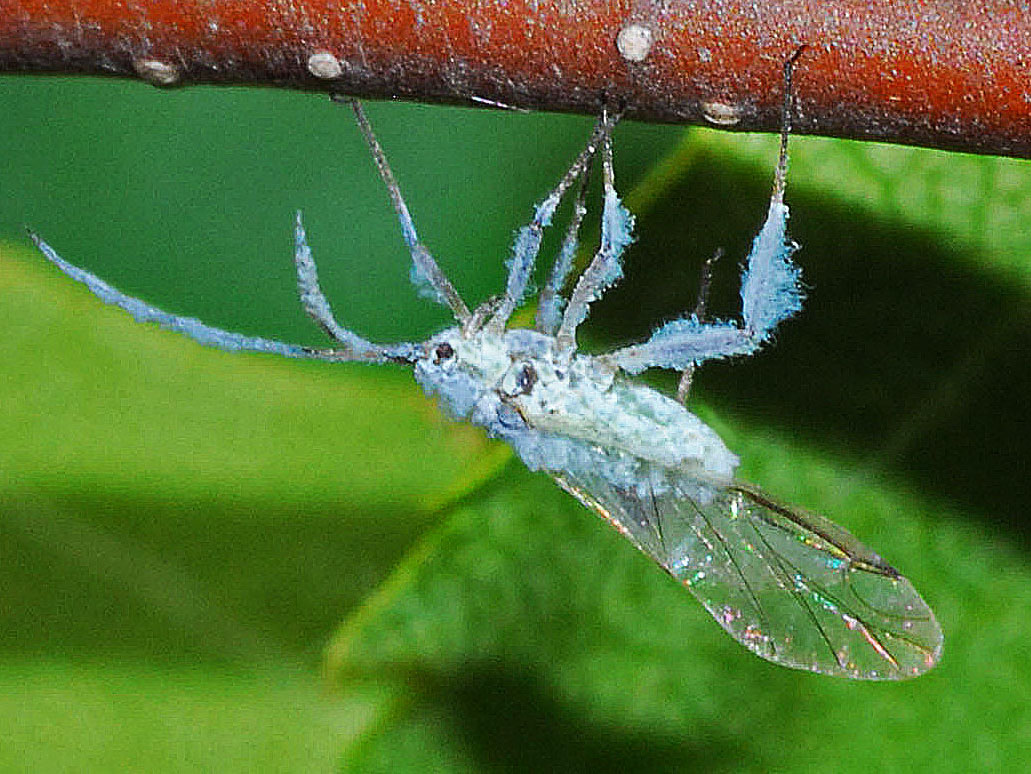
- Phyllaphis fagi. Winged specimen

Scientific classification
- Kingdom: Animalia
- Phylum: Arthropoda
- Class: Insecta
- Order: Hemiptera
- Suborder: Sternorrhyncha
- Family: Aphididae
- Genus: Phyllaphis
- Species: P. fagi

Binomial name
- Phyllaphis fagi (Linnaeus,1761)

Synonyms
- Chermes fagi Linnaeus, 1761; Aphis fagi Linnaeus, 1767; Phyllaphis grandifoliae Richards, 1973; Phegirus fagi (Linnaeus, 1767); Lachnus fagi (Linnaeus, 1767)

= Phyllaphis fagi =

Species of true bug

Phyllaphis fagi, the woolly beech aphid, is a species of aphid in the family Aphididae.

It was first described in 1761 as Chermes fagi by Linnaeus.

== Distribution ==
This species can be found in Central and Southern Europe and it has been introduced to the Middle East, Australia, New Zealand and North America.

== Description ==
Phyllaphis fagi can reach a length of the oval body of one to three millimeters. Their bodies are light bluish-green. Some specimen show a pronounced dark banding on the abdomen. The antennae are slightly shorter than the body. Winged as well as wingless animals excrete white to bluish-white wax threads, giving them a woolly appearance.

== Biology ==
This species is monoecious and holocyclic. When a cyclical parthenogenesis occurs, aphids reproduce sexually in the autumn and produce an overwintering egg, deposited on buds and bark crevices of the host plant.

In spring the newly hatched nymphs develop in about two to three weeks and at least three molts to wingless, 2–3 mm large Fundatrix. A fundatrix can produce up to 80 virgin young larvae of the next generation. The first-generation form colonies on the underside of infested leaves. During the summer, several generations occur, developing both winged and wingless imago, with four generations until autumn. Only in autumn appears a sexual generation with winged males. After mating, females lay 10 to 16 winter eggs on the host plant.

In Central Europe, preferred host plants are Fagus sylvatica, in Turkey Fagus orientalis, in North America Fagus sylvatica and Fagus grandiflora. These insects can be found primarily on the foliage.

These aphids are a serious pest in European beech forests. They are important producer of honeydew. The predators include hoverflies, parasitic wasps, lacewings and ladybirds.

== Gallery ==
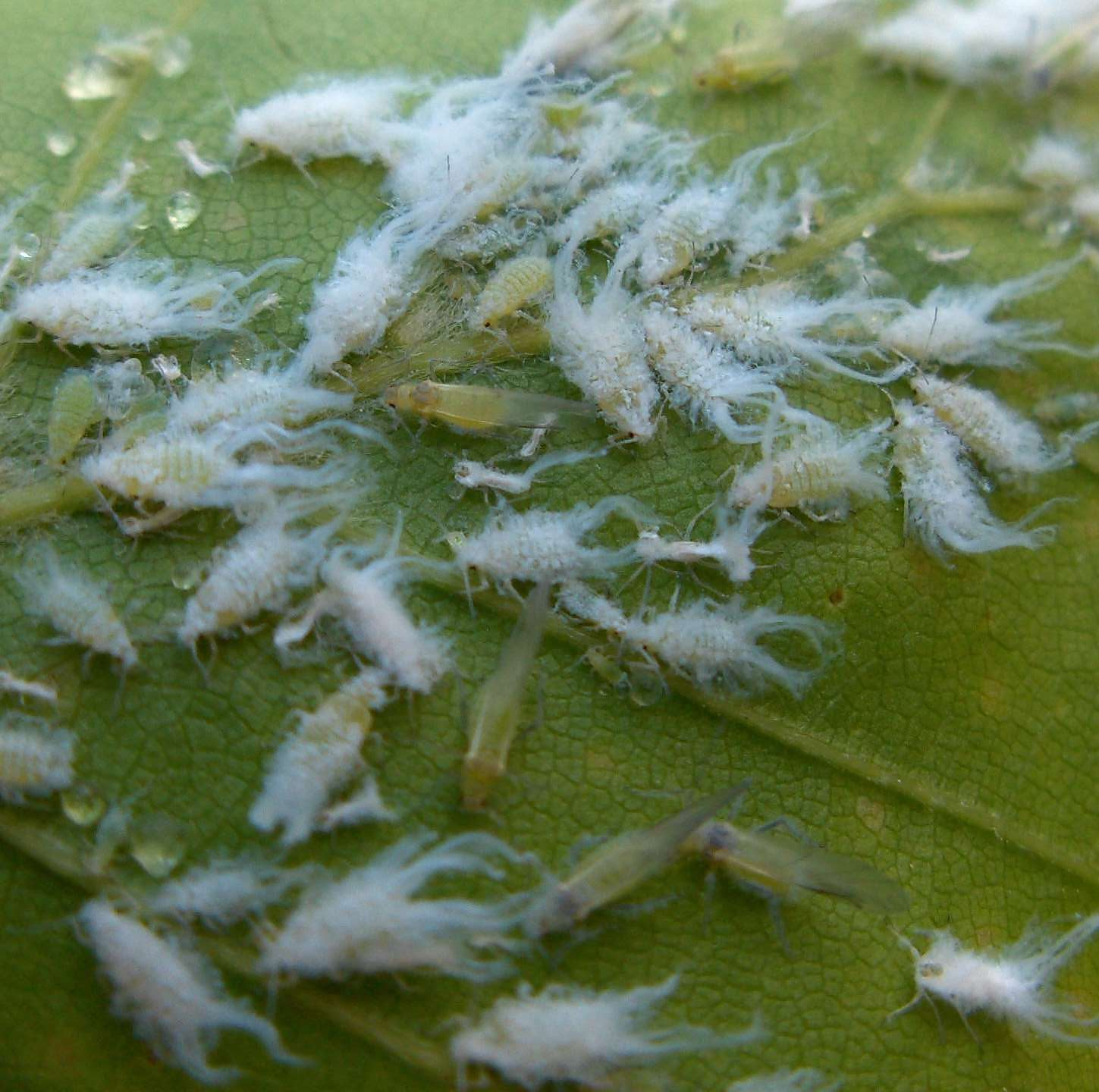
Woolly beech aphid (Phyllaphis fagi) on beech leaf

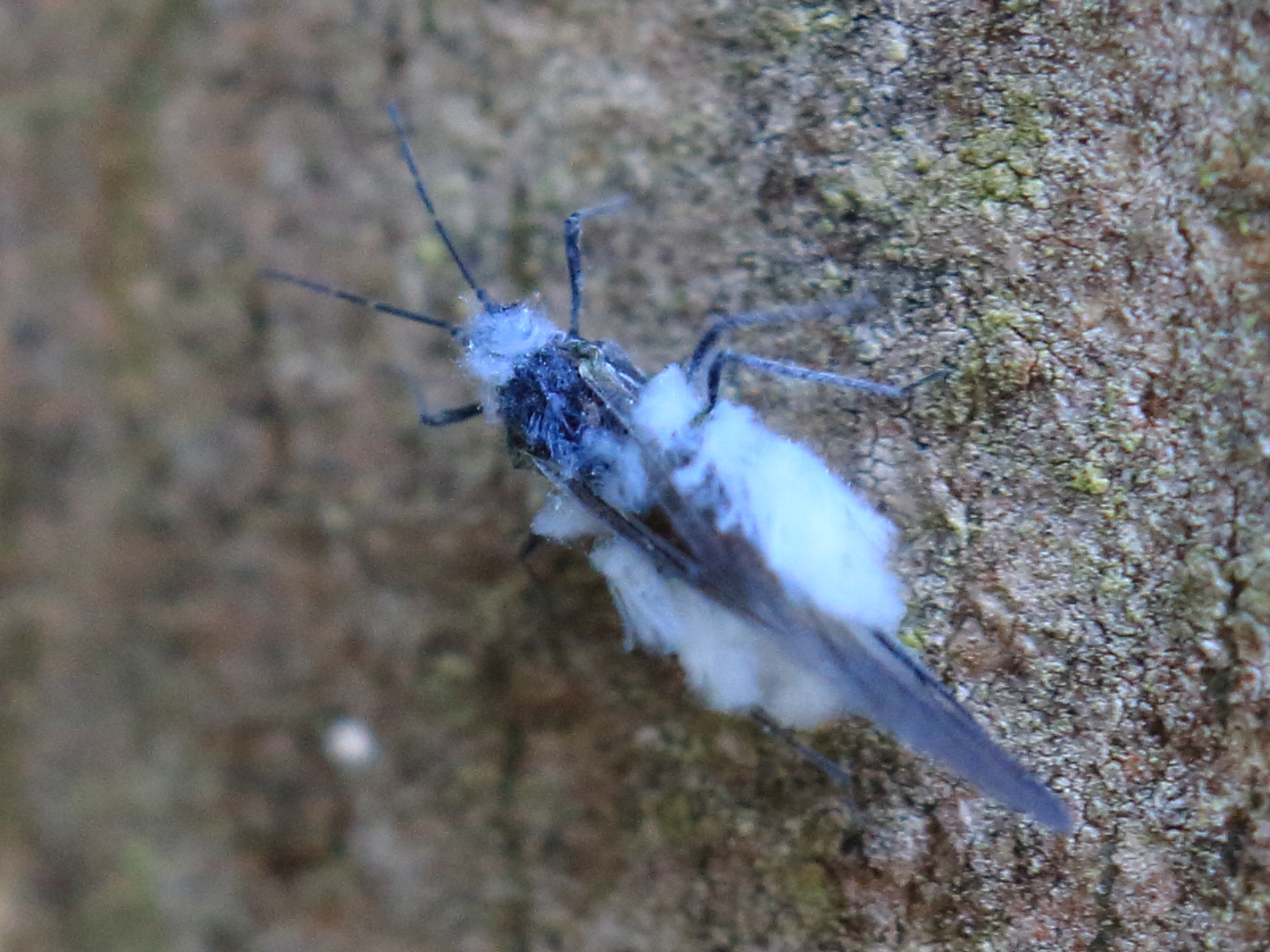
The woolly beech aphid

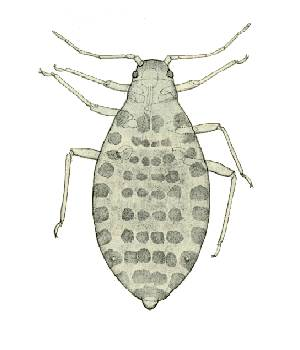
Drawing of an unwinged specimen

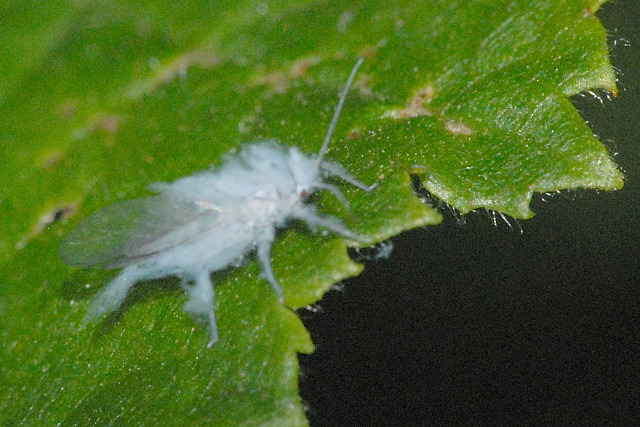
Winged specimen
