= Sitobion luteum =

Scientific classification
- Domain: Eukaryota
- Kingdom: Animalia
- Phylum: Arthropoda
- Class: Insecta
- Order: Hemiptera
- Suborder: Sternorrhyncha
- Family: Aphididae
- Tribe: Macrosiphini
- Genus: Sitobion
- Species: S. luteum

Binomial name
- Sitobion luteum (Buckton, 1876)

Species of true bug

Sitobion luteum, the orchid aphid, is a species of aphid in the family Aphididae. It is found in Europe.
