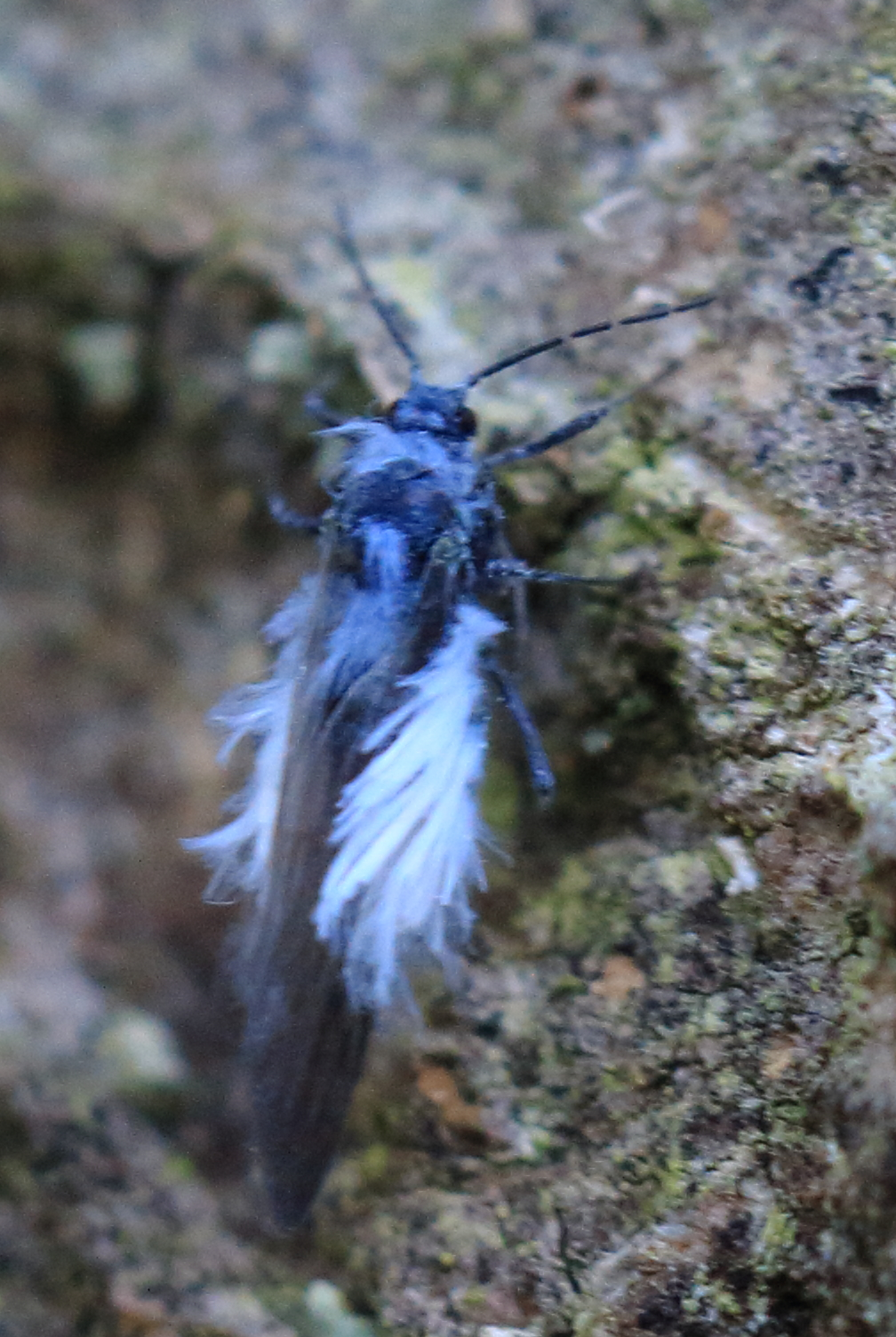
- Phyllaphis fagi

Scientific classification
- Domain: Eukaryota
- Kingdom: Animalia
- Phylum: Arthropoda
- Class: Insecta
- Order: Hemiptera
- Suborder: Sternorrhyncha
- Family: Aphididae
- Subfamily: Phyllaphidinae
- Genus: Phyllaphis; Koch, 1856

= Phyllaphis =

Genus of true bugs

Phyllaphis is a genus of aphids in the family Aphididae. There are at least four described species in Phyllaphis.

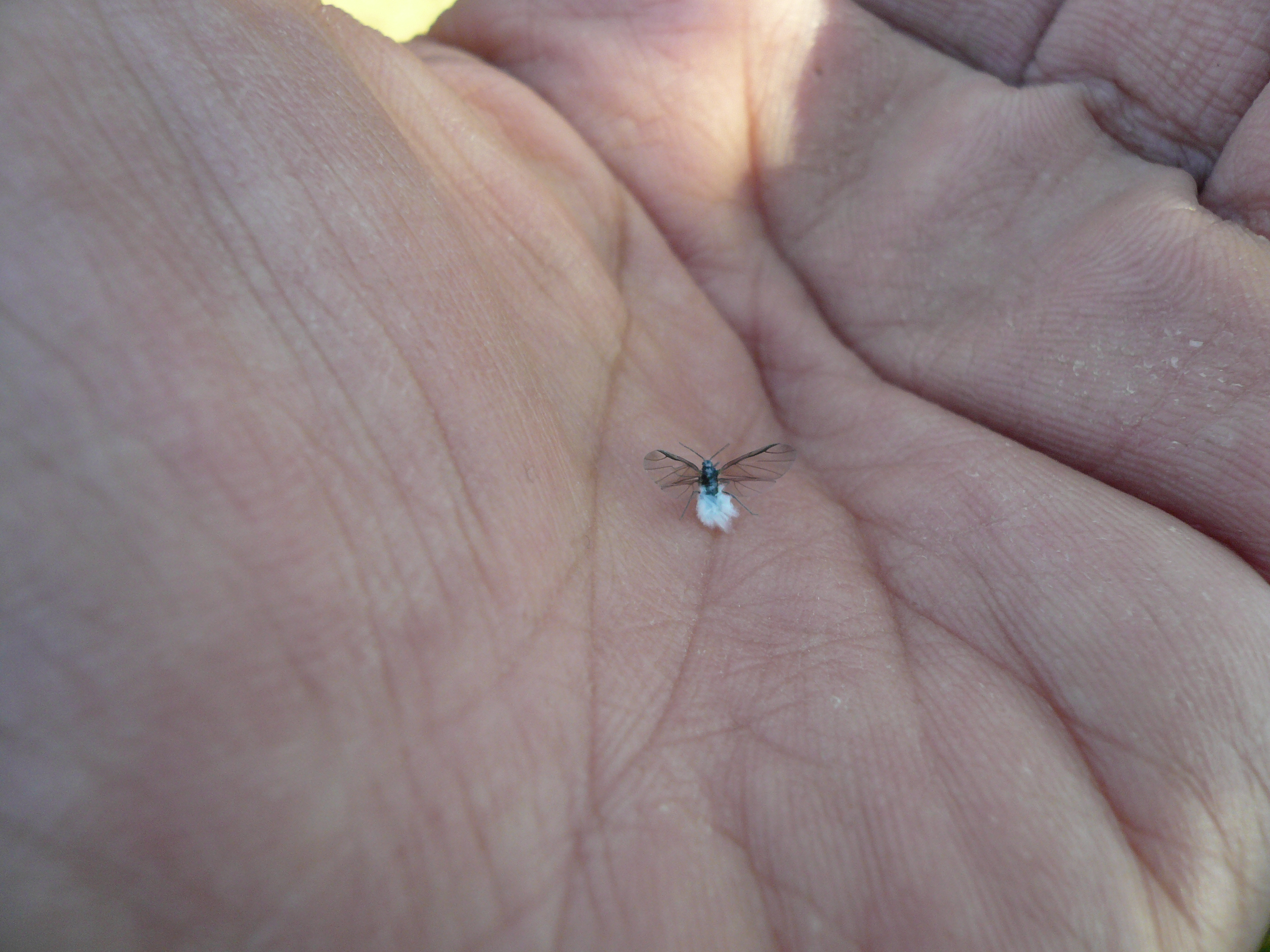
Phyllaphis fagi

== Species ==
These four species belong to the genus Phyllaphis:

- Phyllaphis fagi Richards, 1973^{c g b} (woolly beech aphid)
- Phyllaphis fagifoliae Takahashi, R., 1919^{c g}
- Phyllaphis grandifoliae Richards, 1973^{c g b} (woolly beech aphid)
- Phyllaphis nigra Ashmead, 1881^{c g}

Data sources: i = ITIS, c = Catalogue of Life, g = GBIF, b = Bugguide.net
