= Sitobion pauliani =

Paulian grain aphid

Scientific classification
- Domain: Eukaryota
- Kingdom: Animalia
- Phylum: Arthropoda
- Class: Insecta
- Order: Hemiptera
- Suborder: Sternorrhyncha
- Family: Aphididae
- Genus: Sitobion
- Species: S. pauliani

Binomial name
- Sitobion pauliani Remaudiere 1957

Species of true bug

The Paulian grain aphid (Sitobion pauliani), also known as Sitobion (Sitobion) pauliani, is an aphid in the superfamily Aphidoidea in the order Hemiptera. It is a true bug and sucks sap from plants.
