= Taiwanaphis =

Scientific classification
- Domain: Eukaryota
- Kingdom: Animalia
- Phylum: Arthropoda
- Class: Insecta
- Order: Hemiptera
- Suborder: Sternorrhyncha
- Family: Aphididae
- Subfamily: Taiwanaphidinae; Quednau & Remaudière, 1994
- Genus: Taiwanaphis; Takahashi, 1934

Subfamily of true bugs

Taiwanaphis is the sole genus in Taiwanaphidinae: a monotypic subfamily of the family Aphididae.
