= Phyllaphidinae =

Scientific classification
- Domain: Eukaryota
- Kingdom: Animalia
- Phylum: Arthropoda
- Class: Insecta
- Order: Hemiptera
- Suborder: Sternorrhyncha
- Family: Aphididae
- Subfamily: Phyllaphidinae; Herrich-Schaeffer, 1857

Genera
- Diphyllaphis; Machilaphis; Phyllaphis; Stegophylla

Subfamily of true bugs

Phyllaphidinae is a small subfamily of the family Aphididae.
