= Lizeriinae =

Scientific classification
- Domain: Eukaryota
- Kingdom: Animalia
- Phylum: Arthropoda
- Class: Insecta
- Order: Hemiptera
- Suborder: Sternorrhyncha
- Family: Aphididae
- Subfamily: Lizeriinae; Blanchard, 1923

Genera
- Ceriferella; Lizerius; Paoliella

Subfamily of true bugs

Lizeriinae is a subfamily of the family Aphididae.
