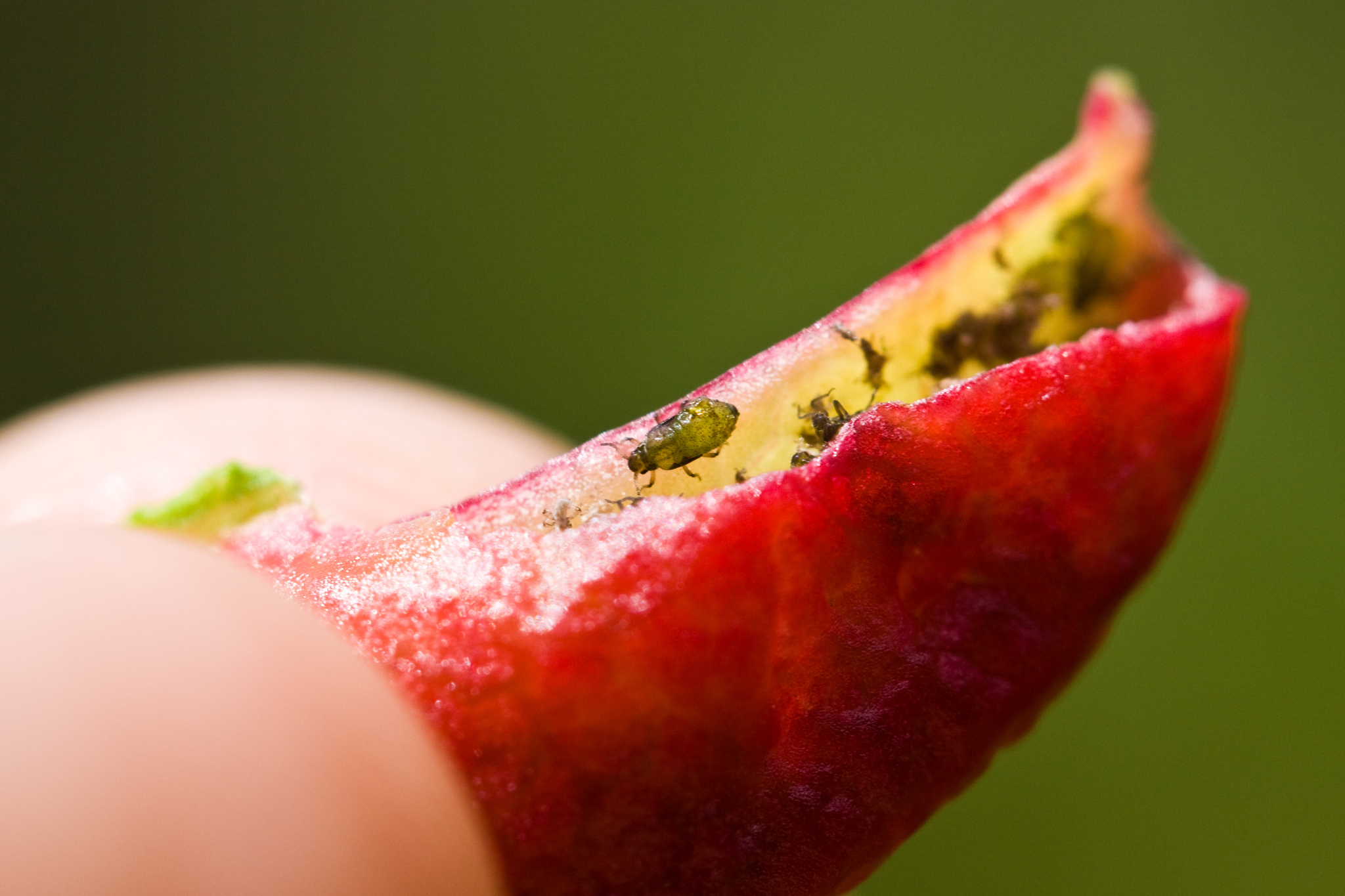

Scientific classification
- Kingdom: Animalia
- Phylum: Arthropoda
- Class: Insecta
- Order: Hemiptera
- Suborder: Sternorrhyncha
- Family: Aphididae
- Genus: Tamalia
- Species: T. glaucensis

Binomial name
- Tamalia glaucensis Miller & Pike, 2023

= Tamalia glaucensis =

Species of true bug

Tamalia glaucensis is a species of North American aphid described in 2023 that induces leaf galls on Arctostaphylos glauca (commonly known as big-berry manzanita).
