= Israelaphis =

Scientific classification
- Domain: Eukaryota
- Kingdom: Animalia
- Phylum: Arthropoda
- Class: Insecta
- Order: Hemiptera
- Suborder: Sternorrhyncha
- Family: Aphididae
- Subfamily: Israelaphidinae; Ilharco, 1961
- Genus: Israelaphis; Essig, 1953

Subfamily of true bugs

Israelaphis is the sole genus in Israelaphidinae: a monotypic subfamily of the family Aphididae.

== Species ==
The Aphid Species File lists:

1. Israelaphis carmini Essig, 1953 - type species
2. Israelaphis caucasica Mamontova & Zhuravlev, 2003
3. Israelaphis ilharcoi Barbagallo & Patti, 1999
4. Israelaphis lambersi Ilharco, 1961
