= Saltusaphidinae =

Scientific classification
- Domain: Eukaryota
- Kingdom: Animalia
- Phylum: Arthropoda
- Class: Insecta
- Order: Hemiptera
- Suborder: Sternorrhyncha
- Family: Aphididae
- Subfamily: Saltusaphidinae; Baker, 1920

Tribes
- Saltusaphidini; Thripsaphidini

Subfamily of true bugs

Saltusaphidinae is a subfamily of the family Aphididae.

== Genera ==
=== Tribe: Saltusaphidini ===
Iziphya - Juncobia - Nevskya - Saltusaphis - Sminthuraphis - Strenaphis - Subiziphya

=== Tribe: Thripsaphidini ===
Allaphis - Neosaltusaphis - Peltaphis - Subsaltusaphis - Thripsaphis
