= Pterastheniinae =

Scientific classification
- Domain: Eukaryota
- Kingdom: Animalia
- Phylum: Arthropoda
- Class: Insecta
- Order: Hemiptera
- Suborder: Sternorrhyncha
- Family: Aphididae
- Subfamily: Pterastheniinae; Remaudière & Quednau, 1988

Genera
- Neoantalus; Pterasthenia

Subfamily of true bugs

Pterastheniinae is a small subfamily of the family Aphididae.
