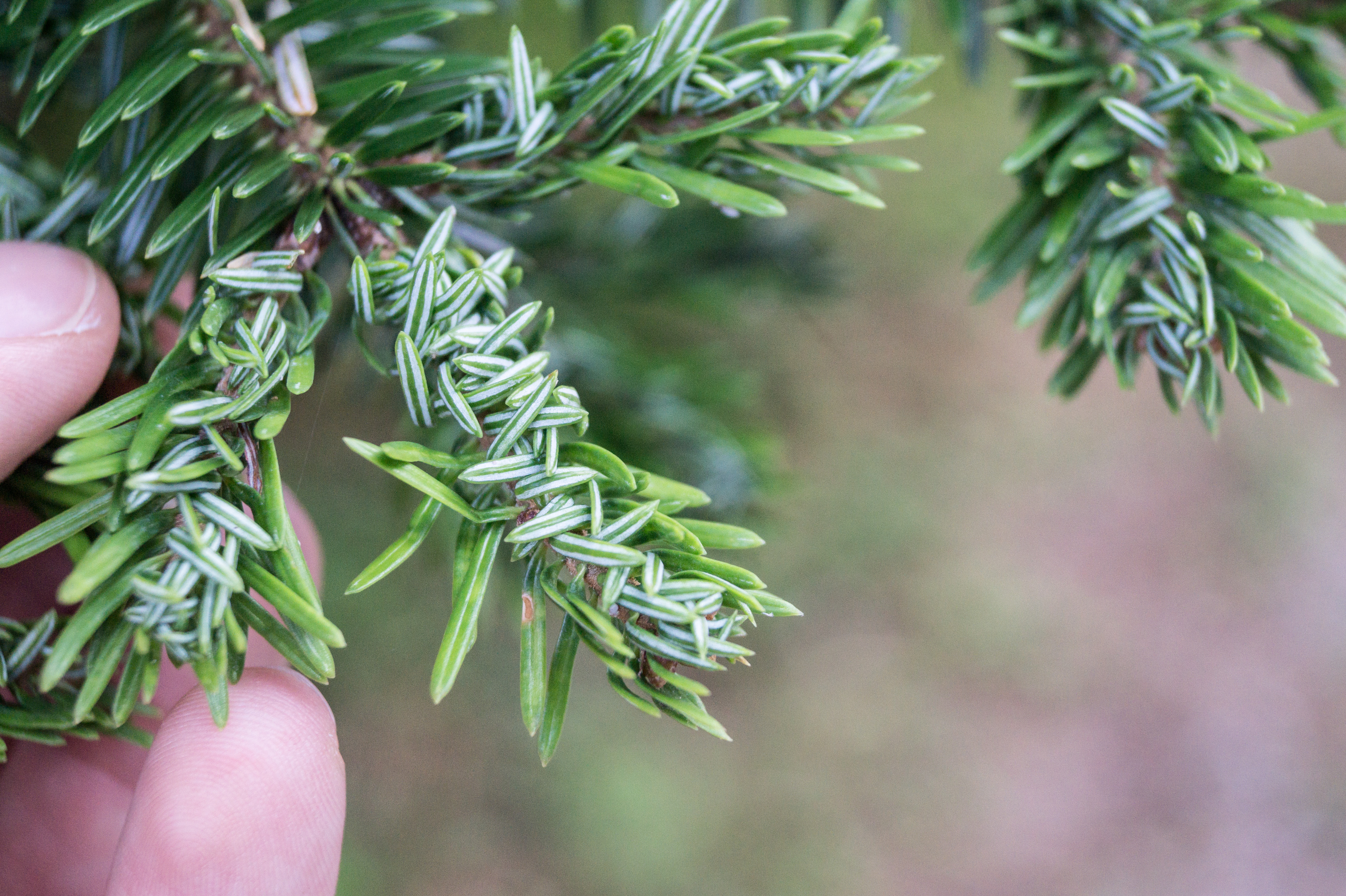
- Mindarus abietinus

Scientific classification
- Domain: Eukaryota
- Kingdom: Animalia
- Phylum: Arthropoda
- Class: Insecta
- Order: Hemiptera
- Suborder: Sternorrhyncha
- Family: Aphididae
- Subfamily: Mindarinae; Tullgren, 1909

Genera
- † Mindarella; Mindarus

= Mindarinae =

Subfamily of true bugs

Mindarinae is a small subfamily of the family Aphididae.
