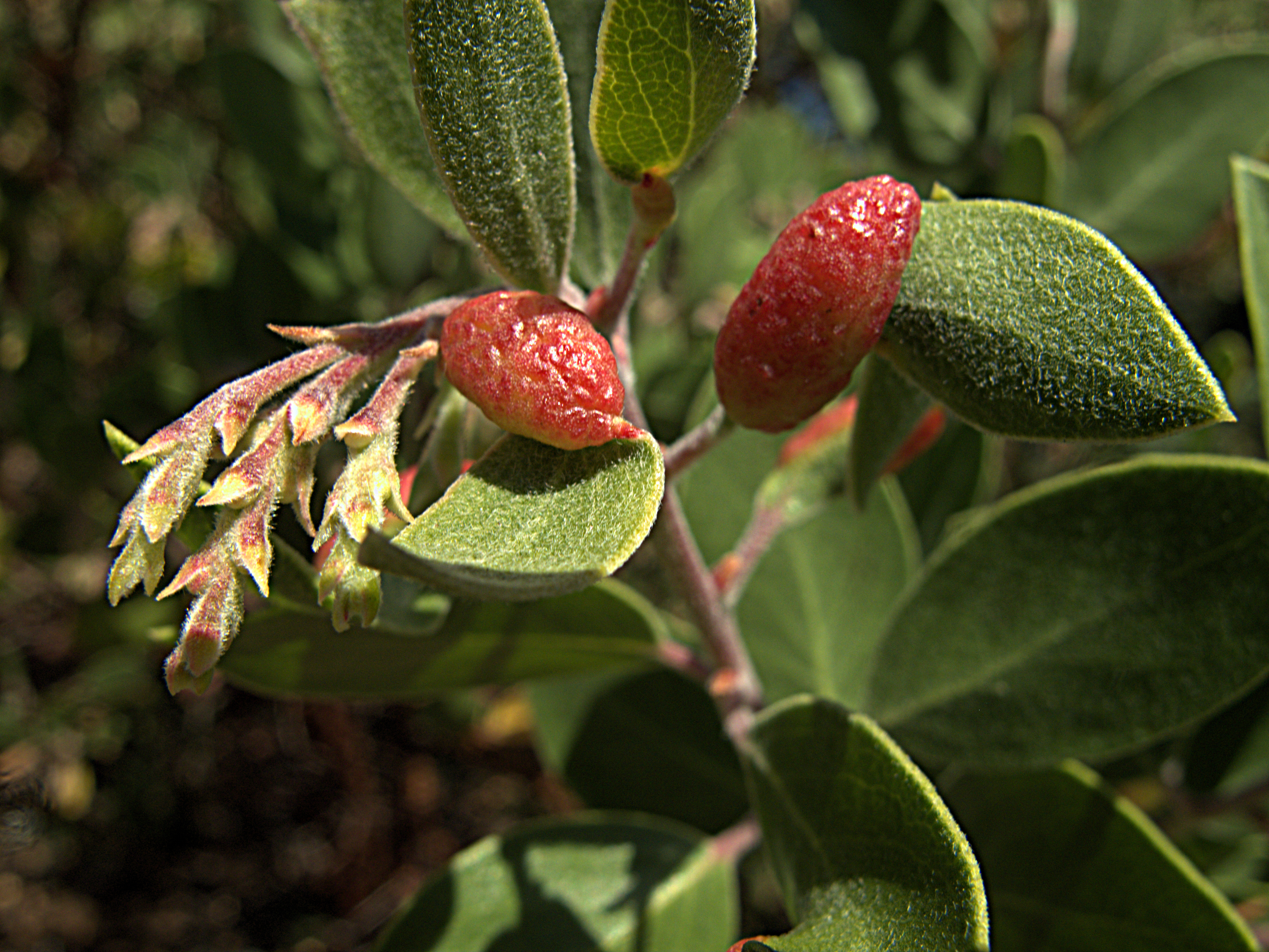
- Tamalia coweni

Scientific classification
- Domain: Eukaryota
- Kingdom: Animalia
- Phylum: Arthropoda
- Class: Insecta
- Order: Hemiptera
- Suborder: Sternorrhyncha
- Family: Aphididae
- Subfamily: Tamaliinae; Oestlund, 1923
- Genus: Tamalia; Baker, 1920

= Tamalia =

Genus of true bugs

Tamalia is a genus of aphids in the family Aphididae. It is the only genus in the subfamily Tamaliinae. There are eight described species in Tamalia.

== Species ==
These eight species belong to the genus Tamalia:

- Tamalia coweni (Cockerell, 1905) (manzanita leaf gall aphid) [Junior synonyms = Tamalia pallida Richards, 1967 and Tamalia tahoense Davidson, 1911))].
- Tamalia cruzensis Miller & Pike, 2023
- Tamalia dicksoni Remaudière & Stroyan, 1984
- Tamalia glaucensis Miller & Pike, 2023
- Tamalia inquilinus Miller, 2000
- Tamalia keltoni Richards, 1967
- Tamalia milleri Kanturski & Wieczorek, 2015
- Tamalia moranae Miller & Pike, 2023
