= Phloeomyzinae =

Scientific classification
- Domain: Eukaryota
- Kingdom: Animalia
- Phylum: Arthropoda
- Class: Insecta
- Order: Hemiptera
- Suborder: Sternorrhyncha
- Family: Aphididae
- Subfamily: Phloeomyzinae; Mordvilko, 1934

Subfamily of true bugs

Phloeomyzinae is a subfamily of the family Aphididae.

== Genera ==
- †Dongbeiaphis Hong, 2002
- †Eocylindrites Hong, 2002
- †Eophloeomyzus Hong, 2002
- †Orbitaphis Hong, 2002
- Phloeomyzus de Horváth, 1896
