= Neophyllaphidinae =

Scientific classification
- Kingdom: Animalia
- Phylum: Arthropoda
- Clade: Pancrustacea
- Class: Insecta
- Order: Hemiptera
- Suborder: Sternorrhyncha
- Family: Aphididae
- Subfamily: Neophyllaphidinae; Takahashi, 1921

Genera
- Neophyllaphis

Subfamily of true bugs

Neophyllaphidinae is a subfamily of the family Aphididae.
