= Macropodaphidinae =

Scientific classification
- Domain: Eukaryota
- Kingdom: Animalia
- Phylum: Arthropoda
- Class: Insecta
- Order: Hemiptera
- Suborder: Sternorrhyncha
- Family: Aphididae
- Subfamily: Macropodaphidinae; Zachvatkin & Aizenberg, 1960

Genera
- Macropodaphis

Subfamily of true bugs

Macropodaphidinae is a small subfamily of the family Aphididae.
