= Baltichaitophorinae =

Scientific classification
- Domain: Eukaryota
- Kingdom: Animalia
- Phylum: Arthropoda
- Class: Insecta
- Order: Hemiptera
- Suborder: Sternorrhyncha
- Family: Aphididae
- Subfamily: Baltichaitophorinae; Heie, 1980

Genera
- Parachaitophorus Takahashi, 1937; † Baltichaitophorus Heie, 1967

Subfamily of true bugs

Baltichaitophorinae is a subfamily of the family Aphididae.
