= Spicaphidinae =

Scientific classification
- Domain: Eukaryota
- Kingdom: Animalia
- Phylum: Arthropoda
- Class: Insecta
- Order: Hemiptera
- Suborder: Sternorrhyncha
- Family: Aphididae
- Genus: Spicaphidinae; Essig, 1953

Genera
- Neosensoriaphis; Neuquenaphis

Subfamily of true bugs

Spicaphidinae is a small subfamily of the family Aphididae.
