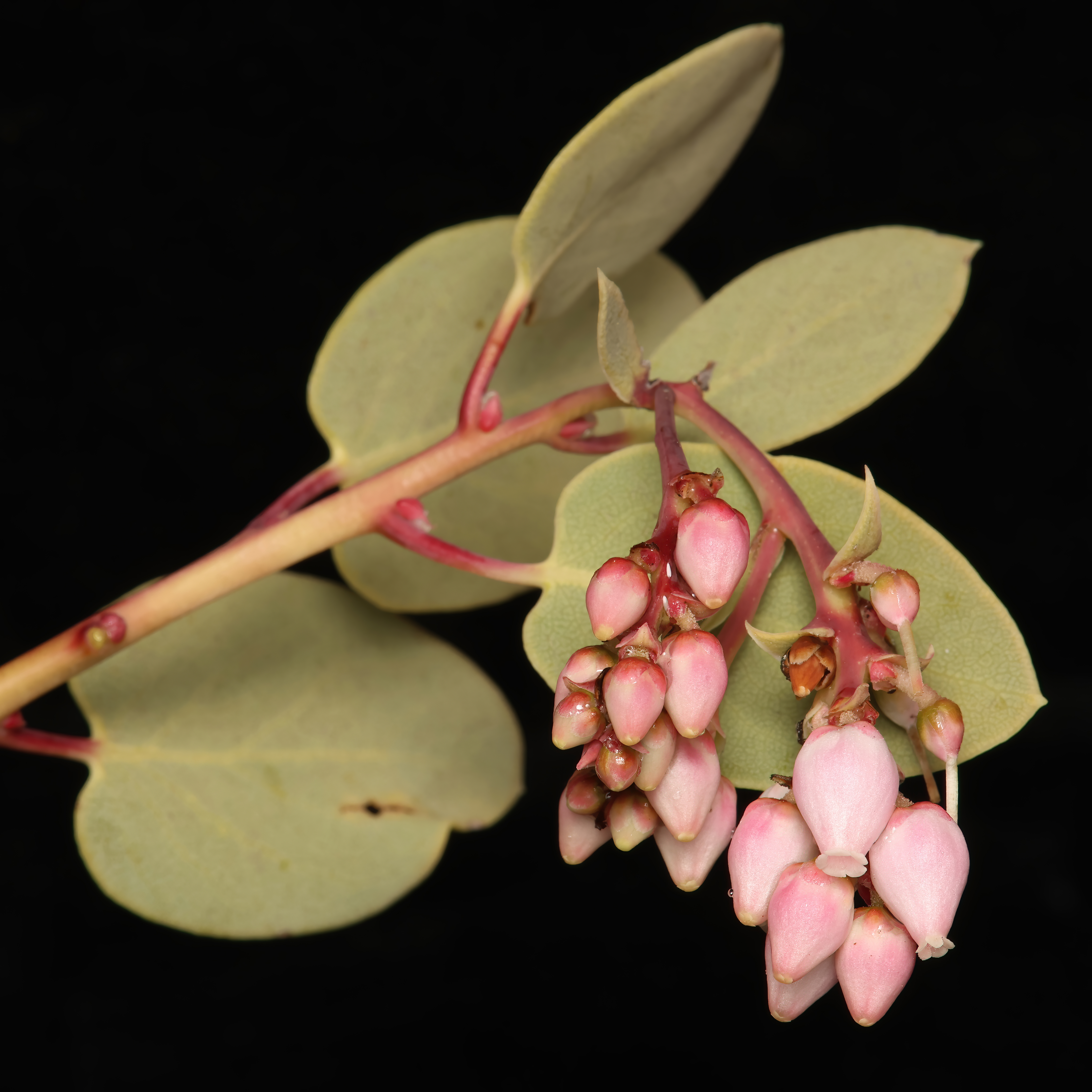

Conservation status
- Least Concern (IUCN 3.1)

Scientific classification
- Kingdom: Plantae
- Clade: Tracheophytes
- Clade: Angiosperms
- Clade: Eudicots
- Clade: Asterids
- Order: Ericales
- Family: Ericaceae
- Genus: Arctostaphylos
- Species: A. glauca

Binomial name
- Arctostaphylos glauca Lindl.

= Arctostaphylos glauca =

Species of tree

Arctostaphylos glauca is a species of manzanita known by the common name bigberry manzanita. It is native to California and Baja California, where it grows in the chaparral and woodland of coastal and inland hills. In October 2025, Arctostaphylos glauca was established as the State Shrub of California.

== Description ==
Arctostaphylos glauca is a large shrub varying in size from one to well over six meters in height. Individuals growing in desert regions tend to be shorter than those on the coast. Leaves are light gray-green, somewhat waxy, oval in shape to nearly round, and smooth or toothed along the edges. They are up to five centimeters long and four wide and grow on short petioles about a centimeter long.

The inflorescence holds hanging clusters of narrow urn-shaped white flowers. The edible fruit is a round or egg-shaped drupe 12 to 15 millimeters wide. It is light red in color and has a thick pulp covered in a tough, sticky coat. The fruit contains three to six nutlets fused into a single mass. The shrub reproduces by seed and by layering. Seeds require exposure to fire before they can germinate.

It is a long-lived species, reaching 100 years of age or more, though it does not begin to fruit until it is around 20 years old. The shrub is allelopathic, inhibiting the growth of other plants in its understory when rain leaches toxic arbutin and phenolic acids from its foliage.

== Uses ==
Despite their constipating effects, the fruits were eaten by the Native Americans of California, who also made the ripe fruit into a cider.

== Ecology ==
Tamalia glaucensis is an aphid that induces leaf galls on big-berry manzanita.

== See also ==
- California chaparral and woodlands
- California coastal sage and chaparral
- California montane chaparral and woodlands
