= Ryoichi Takahashi =

Japanese entomologist

Ryoichi Takahashi (高橋 良一, Takahashi Ryōichi) (April 6, 1898—July 17, 1963) was a Japanese entomologist. His research focused on hemiptera, including aphids, whiteflies, and scale insects. He published more than 420 articles.

Taxa named after him include:

- Takahashilecanium Kondo, 2005
- Xenolecanium takahashii Kondo, 2005
- Rhachisphora takahashii Martin & Lau, 2011
- Melanaphis takahashii Skvarla et al., 2020
- Aclerda takahashii Kuwana, 1932
- Dicranomyia takahashii Alexander, 1920
- Rhyacobates takahashii Esaki, 1923
- Ormosia takahashii Alexander, 1919
- Aleurotuberculatus takahashii David & Subramaniam, 1976
- Aleyrodes takahashii Ossiannilsson, 1966
- Rhinopsylla takashii Boselli, 1930
- Setaleytodes takahashia Singh, 1933
- Isotomurus takahashii (Yosii, 1940)
- Asterobemisia takahashii Danzig, 1966
- Dialeurolonga takahashi David & Jesudasan, 1989
- Togepsylla takahashii Kuwayama, 1931
