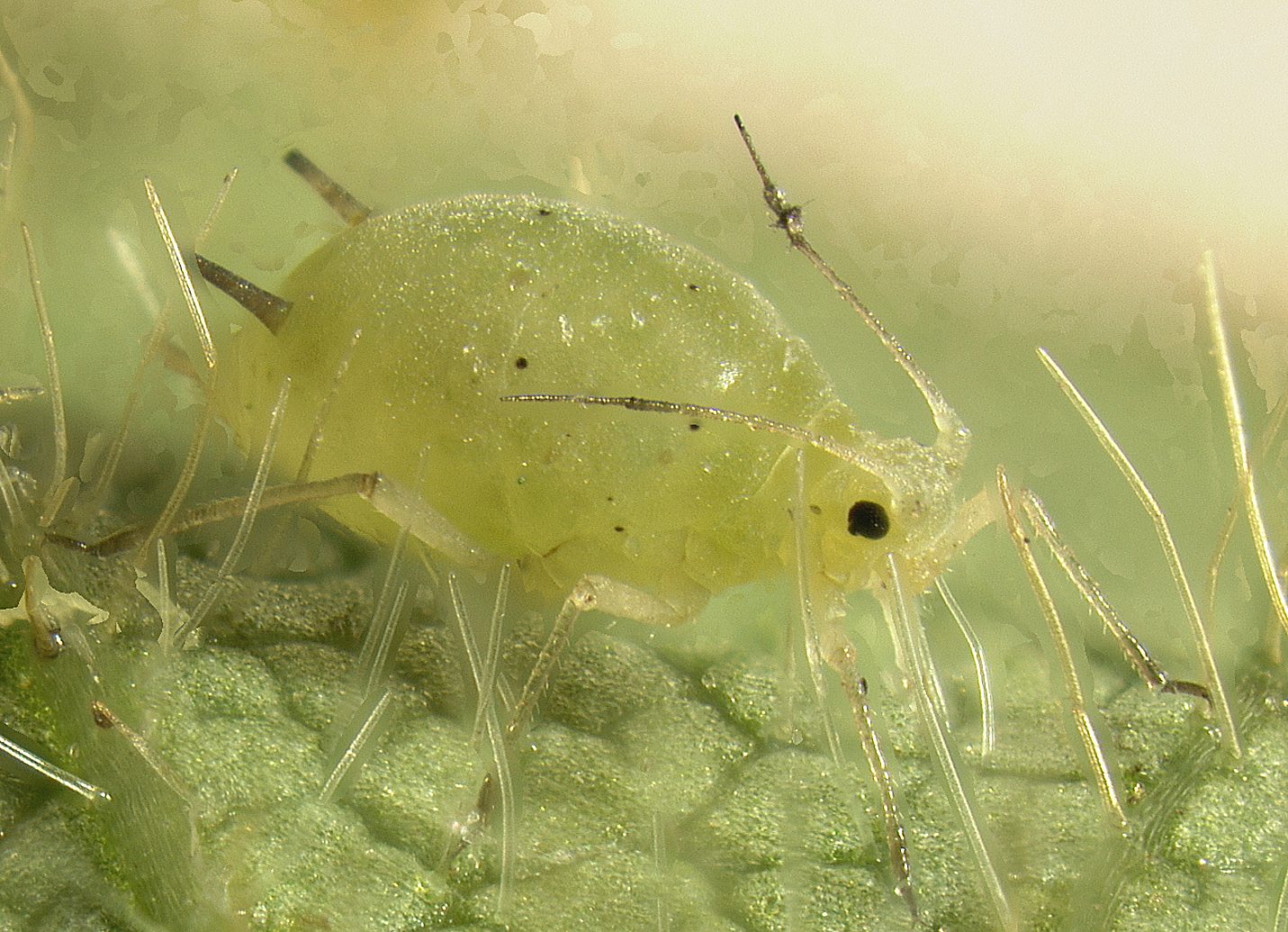
- Aphis glycines, the soybean aphid

Scientific classification
- Kingdom: Animalia
- Phylum: Arthropoda
- Clade: Pancrustacea
- Class: Insecta
- Order: Hemiptera
- Suborder: Sternorrhyncha
- Infraorder: Aphidomorpha
- Superfamily: Aphidoidea
- Family: Aphididae; Latreille, 1802

= Aphididae =

Family of true bugs

The Aphididae are a very large insect family in the aphid superfamily (Aphidoidea), of the order Hemiptera. These insects suck the sap from plant leaves. Several thousand species are placed in this family, many of which are considered plant/crop pests. They are the family of insects containing most plant virus vectors (around 200 known) with the green peach aphid (Myzus persicae) being one of the most prevalent and indiscriminate carriers.

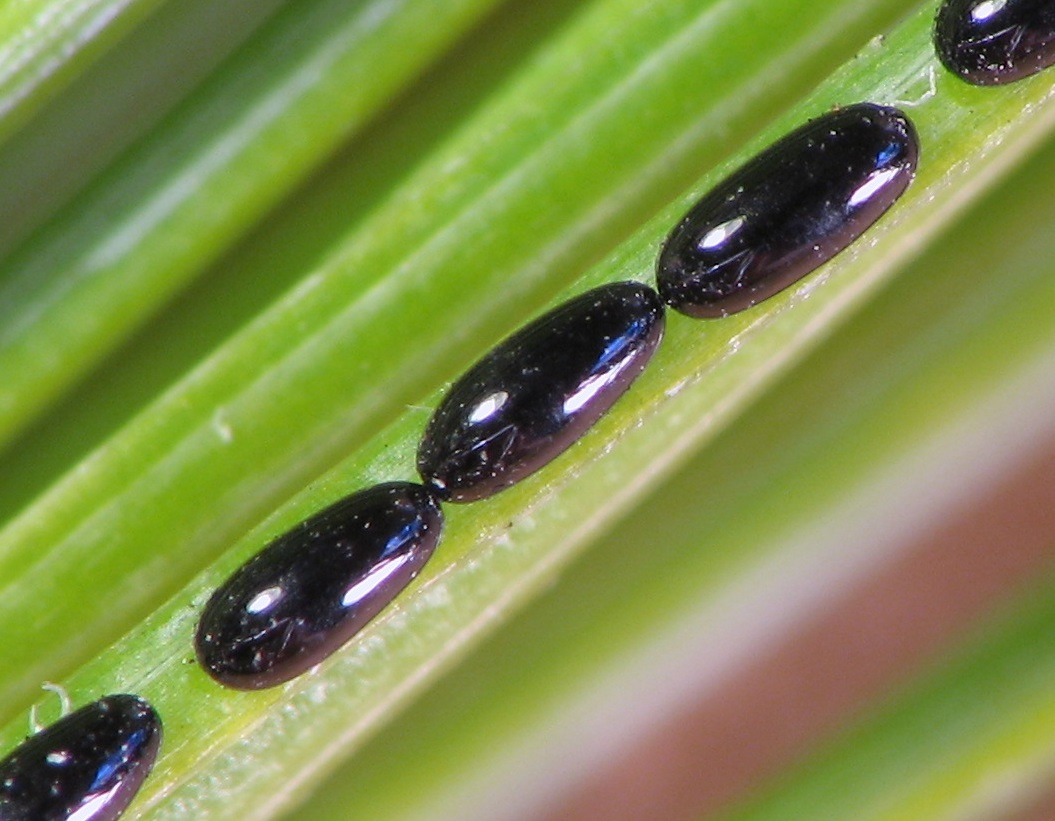
Eggs of Cinara strobi on white pine

Milkweed aphids giving live birth on narrow leaf milkweed. Sped up twenty times.

== Evolution ==
Aphids originated in the late Cretaceous about 100 million years ago (Mya), but the Aphidinae which comprises about half of the 4700 described species and genera of aphids alive today comes from their most recent radiation which occurred in the late Tertiary less than 10 Mya.

== Reproduction ==
Most aphid species can reproduce both asexually and sexually, with several parthenogenetic generations between each period of sexual reproduction. This is known as cyclical parthenogenesis and, in temperate regions, sexual reproduction occurs in autumn and results in the production of overwintering eggs, which hatch the following spring and initiate another cycle. Many pest aphids, however, do not overwinter as an egg but as nymphs or adults and others as both eggs and active stages (see Williams and Dixon 2007). For their size, the parthenogenetic individuals have very short developmental times and potentially prodigious rates of increase (de Réaumur 1737; Huxley 1858; Kindlmann and Dixon 1989; Dixon 1992). Thus, aphids show very complex and rapidly changing within-year dynamics, with each clone going through several generations during the vegetative season and being made up of many individuals, which can be widely scattered in space. The survival of the eggs and/or overwintering aphids determines the numbers of aphids present the following spring.

The within-year dynamics of aphids are largely determined by seasonal changes in host quality. Aphids do best when amino acids are actively translocated in the phloem. In spring, the leaves grow and import amino acids via the phloem; in summer leaves are mature and export mainly sugars. In autumn, the leaves senesce and export amino acids and other nutrients. Thus on trees the leaves are most suitable for aphids in spring and autumn. The differences in within-year population dynamics of aphids are due to differences in the effect these seasonal fluctuations in host plant quality have on the per capita rate of increase and intraspecific competition in each species. This annual cycle, consisting of two short periods when the host plant is very favourable and a long intervening period when it is less favourable, is well documented for tree dwelling aphids. This has greatly facilitated the modelling of their population dynamics. In general the aphid carrying capacity of annual crop plants tends to increase with the season until the plants mature after which it tends to decrease very rapidly. Thus, the aphid carrying capacity of trees tends to be high in spring and autumn and low in summer, whereas that particularly of short-season annual crops tends to be low early in a year, peaking mid year and then declining.

== Characteristics ==
Milkweed aphids on narrow-leaf milkweed eliminating honeydew. Unlike some aphids, these kick the drop away with their leg.

A milkweed aphid on narrow-leaf milkweed is attacked by a hoverfly larvae. It thrashes and releases pheromones and sticky wax from its cornicles. Nearby aphids flee. Video played at 4X speed.

Members of the Aphididae are soft-bodied, pear-shaped insects called aphids, as are other members of the superfamily Aphidoidea. Most of them have a pair of little tubes, called cornicles, projecting dorsally from the posterior of their abdomens. The cornicles have been variously interpreted as organs of excretion or for the production of honeydew, but their only confirmed function to date is that they produce fatty alarm pheromones when the insects are attacked by predators.

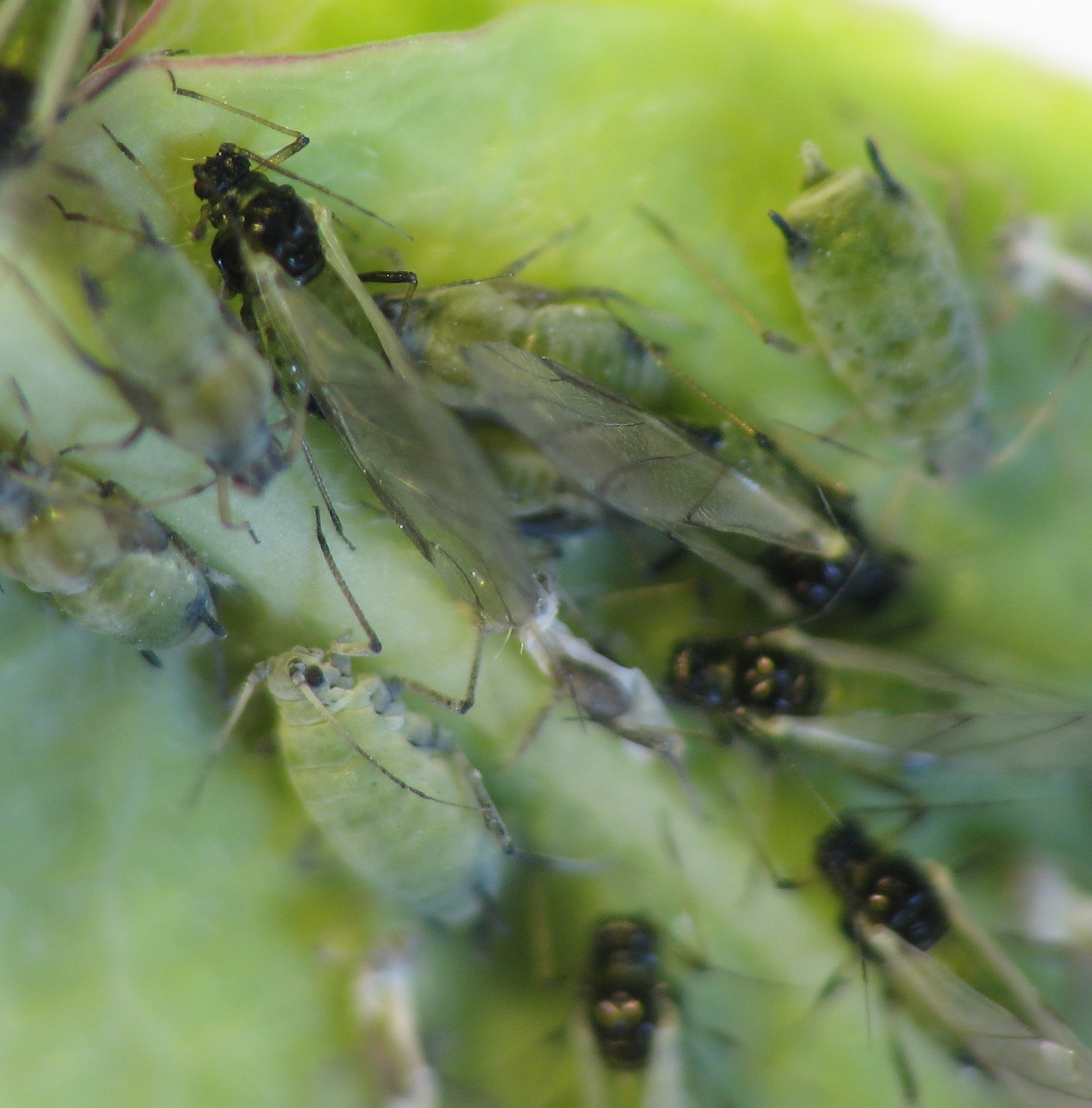
Hyadaphis winged and wingless adults

Hoverfly larva on narrow-leaf milkweed with milkweed aphids, ladybird eggs, and larva. After first minute, shown at four times speed. Larva recorded in early morning prior to sunrise.

When wings are present they occur only on particular morphs called "alates", and wingless morphs are said to be "apterous". The forewing (mesothoracic wing) of the alate in the Aphididae has four to six veins attached to a major vein-like structure that has been interpreted as the combined stems of all the other major wing veins. That structure ends in a stigma, a solid spot on the anterior margin of the forewing. The rear (metathoracic) wings have a similar scheme, but simpler in structure, with no stigma. The rear wing however, does bear a hamulus, a small hook that, when in flight, engages the claval fold of the forewing, keeping the wing beats in synchrony.

All aphids have very small eyes, sucking mouthparts in the form of a relatively long, segmented rostrum, and fairly long antennae.

These insects are so small (a few millimeters in length), that winds can transport them for fairly long distances. They are often green, but might be red or brown, as well. They move quite slowly and cannot jump or hop. Aphids excrete a sugary liquid called honeydew, because the plant sap from which they feed contains excess carbohydrates relative to its low protein content. To satisfy their protein needs, they absorb large amounts of sap and excrete the excess carbohydrates. Honeydew is used as food by ants, honeybees, and many other insects.

== Classification ==
There is considerable controversy in the classification of aphids, with conservative classifications recognizing as many as 24 subfamilies within a single family Aphididae and others elevating various subfamilies to establish as many as 9 other families within Aphidoidea in addition to Aphididae.

=== Subfamilies ===
The Aphid Species File currently (2021) lists:

- Aiceoninae [Eastop & van Emden. 1972?] - monotypic
- Anoeciinae Tullgren, 1909
- Aphidinae Latreille, 1802
- Baltichaitophorinae Heie, 1980
- Calaphidinae Oestlund, 1919
- Chaitophorinae Börner. 1949
- Drepanosiphinae Herrich-Schaeffer, 1857
- Eriosomatinae [Baker, 1920?]
- Greenideinae Baker, 1920
- Hormaphidinae [Baker 1920?]
- Israelaphidinae Ilharco, 1961 - monotypic
- Lachninae Herrich-Schaeffer, 1854
- Lizeriinae Blanchard, 1923
- Macropodaphidinae Zachvatkin & Aizenberg, 1960
- Mindarinae Tullgren, 1909 - monotypic
- Neophyllaphidinae Takahashi, 1921 - monotypic
- Phloeomyzinae Mordvilko, 1934
- Phyllaphidinae Herrich-Schaeffer, 1857
- Pterastheniinae Remaudière & Quednau, 1988
- Saltusaphidinae Baker, 1920
- Spicaphidinae Essig, 1953
- Taiwanaphidinae Quednau & Remaudière, 1994 - monotypic
- Tamaliinae Oestlund, 1923 - monotypic
- Thelaxinae Baker, 1920
- Fossil genera

=== Selected species ===
- Aphis fabae - blackfly, black bean aphid, bean aphid, or beet leaf aphid
- Aphis gossypii - cotton aphid, melon aphid, or melon and cotton aphid
- Beech blight aphid (Grylloprociphilus imbricator)
- Brevicoryne brassicae - cabbage aphid, cabbage aphid, or turnip aphid
- Cinara cupressi - cypress aphid
- Macrosiphum euphorbiae - potato aphid
- Melaphis chinensis - Chinese sumac aphid
- Mindarus harringtoni
- Nasonovia ribisnigri
- Pea aphid (Acyrthosiphon pisum)
- Pemphigus betae - sugarbeet root aphid
- Rose aphid (Macrosiphum rosae)
- Russian wheat aphid (Diuraphis noxia)
- Sipha flava - yellow sugarcane aphid
- Soybean aphid (Aphis glycines)
- Toxoptera citricida - brown citrus aphid, black citrus aphid, or oriental citrus aphid
- Witch-hazel cone gall aphid (Hormaphis hamamelidis)

== See also ==
- Wooly aphids - Subfamily: Eriosomatinae
