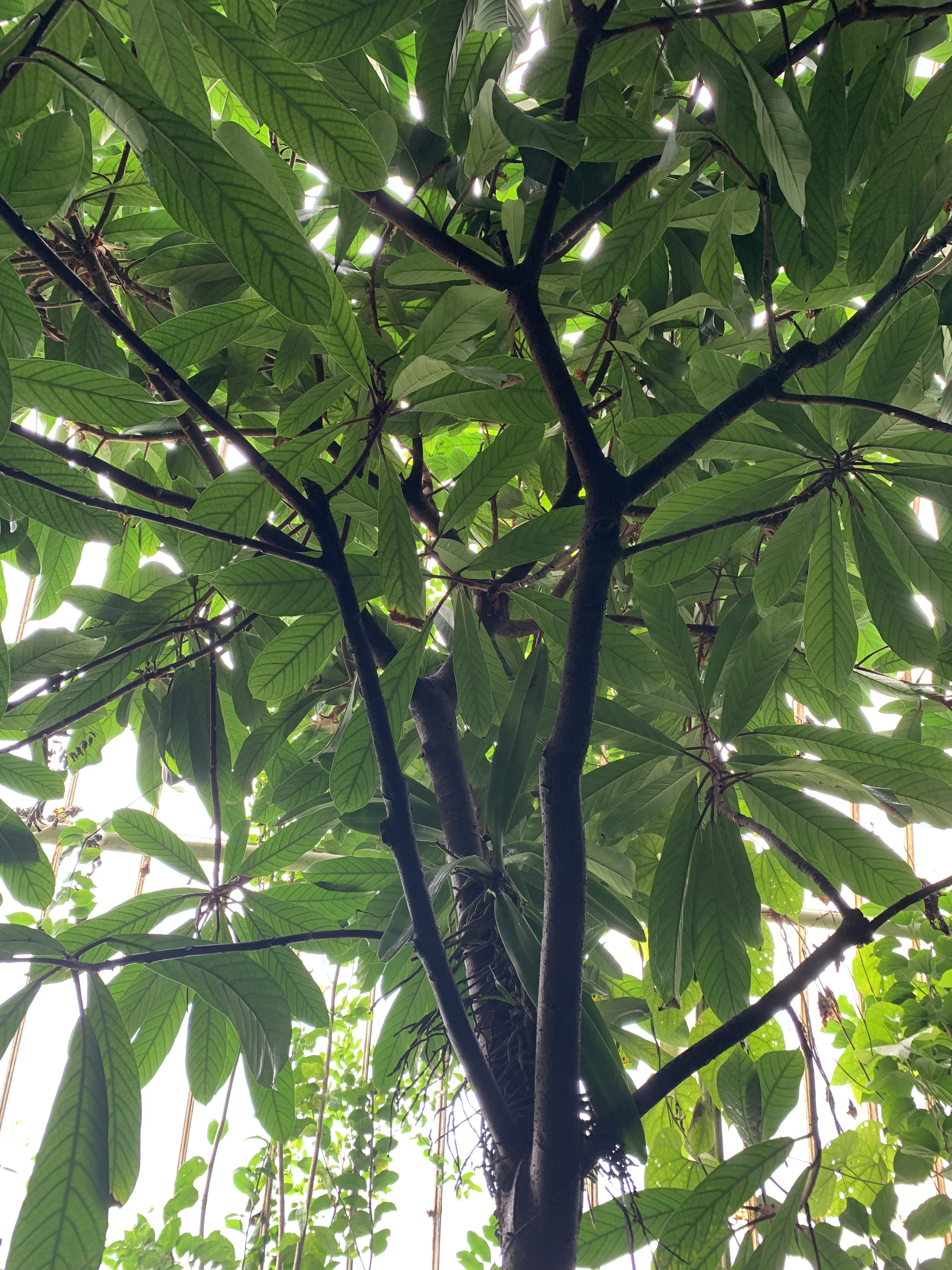

Conservation status
- Least Concern (IUCN 3.1)

Scientific classification
- Kingdom: Plantae
- Clade: Tracheophytes
- Clade: Angiosperms
- Clade: Eudicots
- Clade: Rosids
- Order: Rosales
- Family: Moraceae
- Genus: Ficus
- Species: F. saussureana

Binomial name
- Ficus saussureana DC.

Synonyms
- Ficus afeelii Kunth & C.D.Bouché; Ficus afzelii G.Don; Ficus afzelii var. caillei (A.Chev. ex Mildbr. & Burret) M.F.Barrett, not validly publ.; Ficus argentea Miq.; Ficus dawei Hutch.; Ficus eriobotryoides Kunth & C.D.Bouché; Ficus eriobotryoides var. callei A.Chev. ex Mildbr. & Burret; Ficus eriobotryoides var. monbuttuensis (Warb.) Lebrun; Ficus galactophora Ten.; Ficus monbuttuensis Warb.; Ficus murrayana Miq.; Ficus rubroreceptaculata De Wild.; Ficus zobiaensis De Wild.; Galoglychia saussureana Gasp.; Urostigma eriobotryoides (Kunth & C.D.Bouché) Miq.; Urostigma galactophorum (Ten.) Miq.; Urostigma saussureanum Miq.

= Ficus saussureana =

Species of flowering plant

Ficus saussureana, commonly known as the loquat-leaved fig, loquat-leaf fig, old Calabar fig, or nonko, is a species of flowering plant in the fig family. It is native to west and central and eastern tropical Africa, with a native range spanning Guinea to South Sudan, western Kenya, and northwestern Tanzania. Ficus saussureana is an arboriform species that grows up to 20m tall with a broad crown. Leaves are arranged in spirals, and are entire. Fruits form just below the leaves in twos or threes, and grow to a diameter of 2-4cm. Pests include Greenidea ficicola, a species of aphid, and Psacothea hilaris, a species of beetle.
