= Calvia andrewesi =

Scientific classification
- Kingdom: Animalia
- Phylum: Arthropoda
- Clade: Pancrustacea
- Class: Insecta
- Order: Coleoptera
- Suborder: Polyphaga
- Infraorder: Cucujiformia
- Family: Coccinellidae
- Genus: Calvia
- Species: C. andrewesi

Binomial name
- Calvia andrewesi (Weise, 1908)

Synonyms
- Anisocalvia andrewesi Weise, 1908

Species of beetle

Calvia andrewesi is a species of beetle of the family Coccinellidae. It is found in India (Western Ghats).

== Description ==
Adults reach a length of about 5.5–6 mm (0.22–0.24 in). They are yellowish, reddish brown or dark brown with paler elytral margins. The elytra are either unmarked or yellow with black spots.

== Life history ==
They have been recorded preying on Greenidea species.
