= Calvia shiva =

Scientific classification
- Kingdom: Animalia
- Phylum: Arthropoda
- Clade: Pancrustacea
- Class: Insecta
- Order: Coleoptera
- Suborder: Polyphaga
- Infraorder: Cucujiformia
- Family: Coccinellidae
- Genus: Calvia
- Species: C. shiva

Binomial name
- Calvia shiva Kapur, 1963

Synonyms
- Calvia durgae Kapur, 1963; Calvia trilochana Kapur, 1963; Calvia pinaki Kapur, 1963; Calvia pasupati Kapur, 1963; Calvia connexa Miyatake, 1985

Species of beetle

Calvia shiva is a species of beetle of the family Coccinellidae. It is found in India (Manipur, Sikkim, Uttar Pradesh), Nepal and Bhutan.

== Description ==
Adults reach a length of about 4.4 mm (0.17 in). They are straw yellow, the pronotum with vague pale brown markings. The elytra are yellowish brown with three pale brown stripes on each elytron.

== Life history ==
They have been recorded preying on various aphids, including Cervaphis quercus, Mollitrichosiphum alni and Tuberculatus indicus.
