= Chermidae =

The name Chermidae is an archaic name that has historically been used to refer to one of two different types of Hemiptera, with some confusion due to original application of the name Chermes to two very different insect families:

- Psyllidae
- Adelgidae
