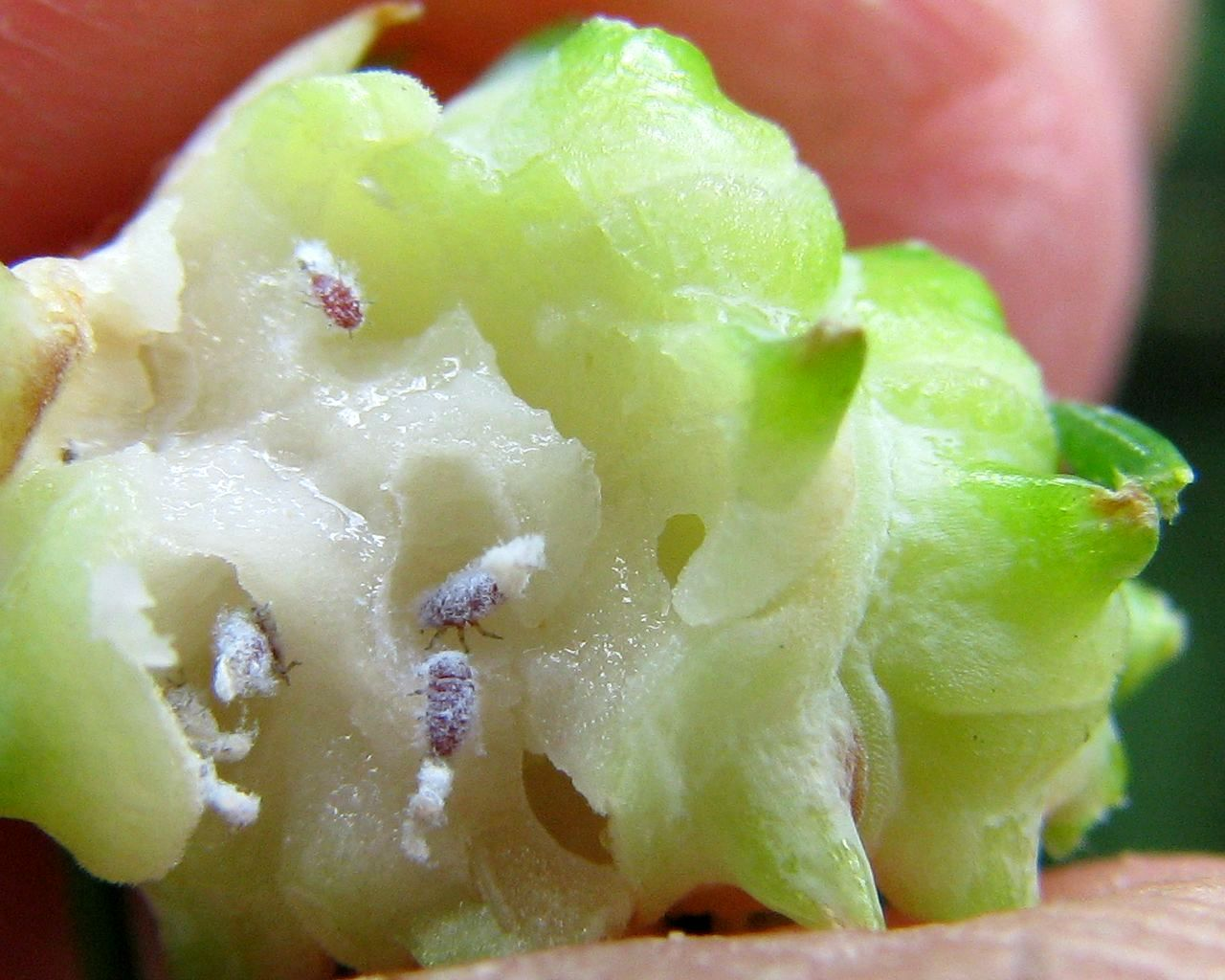
- An opened gall, where the Adelgid nymphs are visible

Scientific classification
- Kingdom: Animalia
- Phylum: Arthropoda
- Clade: Pancrustacea
- Class: Insecta
- Order: Hemiptera
- Suborder: Sternorrhyncha
- Family: Adelgidae
- Genus: Adelges
- Species: A. abietis

Binomial name
- Adelges abietis (Linnaeus, 1758)

Synonyms
- Adelges gallarum-abietis; Chermes abietis; Sacciphantes abietis

= Pineapple gall adelgid =

Species of true bug

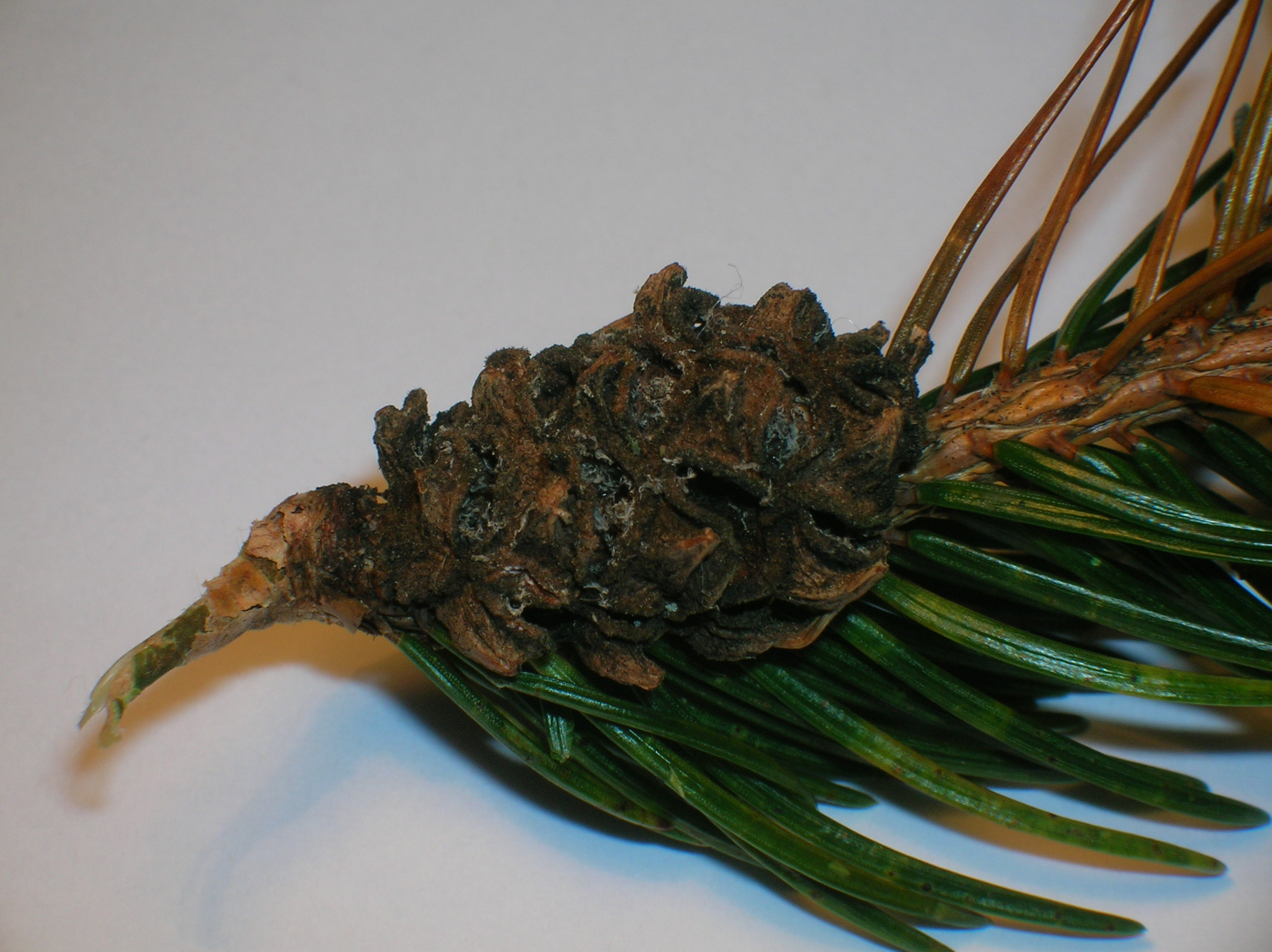
A pineapple pseudocone gall on a Norway spruce branch.

The pineapple gall adelgid (Adelges abietis) is a species of conifer-feeding insect that forms pineapple-shaped plant galls on its host species, commonly Norway and Sitka spruce. The adelgids (genus Adelges) are pear-shaped, soft-bodied green insects with long antennae, closely related to the aphid. Adelges lays up to one hundred eggs at a time, one on each needle. Adelges abietis (Linnaeus, 1758) is one of the most common species; synonyms are A. gallarum-abietis, Chermes abietis and Sacciphantes abietis.

The pineapple or pseudocone gall is a type of insect-formed gall, or abnormal outgrowth of plant tissue, that develops as a chemically induced distortion of needles, observed mostly on Norway spruce and Sitka spruce.

== Terminology and distribution ==
Prominent in appearance, the pineapple or pseudocone gall is often confused with the actual cone of the tree, due to their superficial resemblance. Pineapple galls are distinguishable by their small size, position on the base of budding twigs, and habit of the branch growing on and extending past the gall.

The pineapple gall adelgid is endemic to Europe, belonging to the 'woolly adelgid' group; it is also widely distributed in the north-eastern United States. Spruce gall aphid, eastern spruce pineapple gall adelges and eastern spruce gall aphid are alternative names. This insect belongs to the superfamily Aphidoidea, and family Adelgidae. It is the primary pest of Norway Spruce. Another similar species, the Cooley spruce gall adelgid, is indigenous to North America. This adelgid usually affects Colorado Blue, Sitka, Englemann, and Oriental spruces.

The eastern spruce gall adelgid (Adelges abietis Linnaeus) is an introduced species that feeds only on spruce. At least in 1985, the species was found in Canada from Ontario eastward and in adjacent parts of the United States.

== Physical appearance of the pineapple gall ==
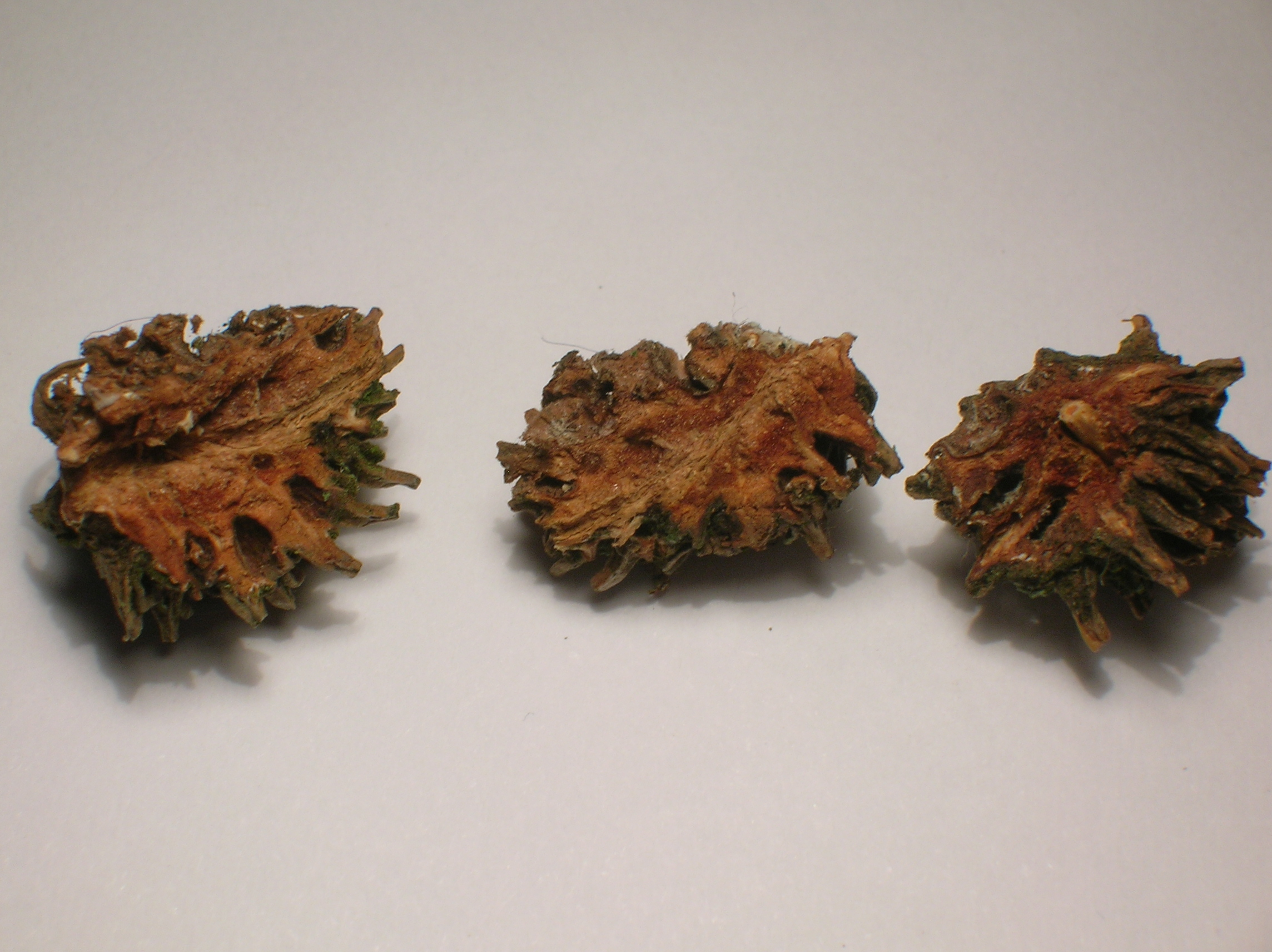
Detail of sectioned galls showing the chambers.

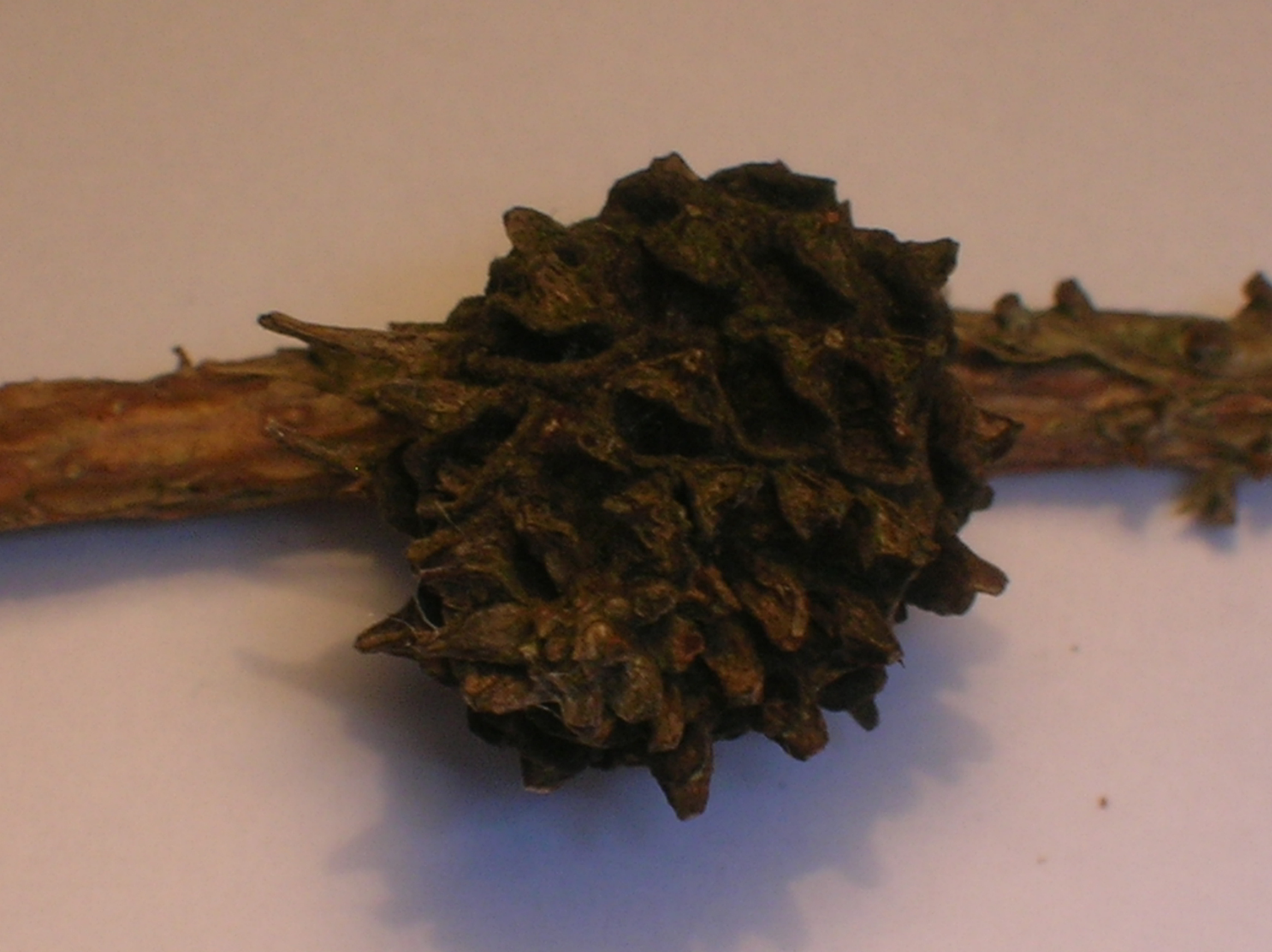
An old pineapple pseudocone gall on a Norway spruce branch.

The gall is formed from the swelling of the bases of the needles punctured by the feeding activity and activated by the saliva of the insect. The unilarval chambers are set in a woody core. The stem and needles of the host can continue growing beyond the position of the gall.

Sitka and Norway spruce are the main hosts, but A. abietis galls can be found on Colorado blue, white, and red spruces.

The yellowish green galls pass through pink and then reddish-brown colour phases. On average, they measure 1.5 to 3.0 cm in length.

Similar galls are produced by other aphids: on Sitka spruce, by the Cooley spruce gall adelgid, Adelges cooleyi, some generations of which migrate to Douglas fir (Pseudotsuga taxifolia); and on spruce by Cnaphalodes sp., which is heteroecious with larch. The Cooley spruce gall adelgids form a larger gall, 25 to 76 millimetres (1 to 3 in) long, which usually covers the entire tip of infested new growth.

== Life-cycle ==
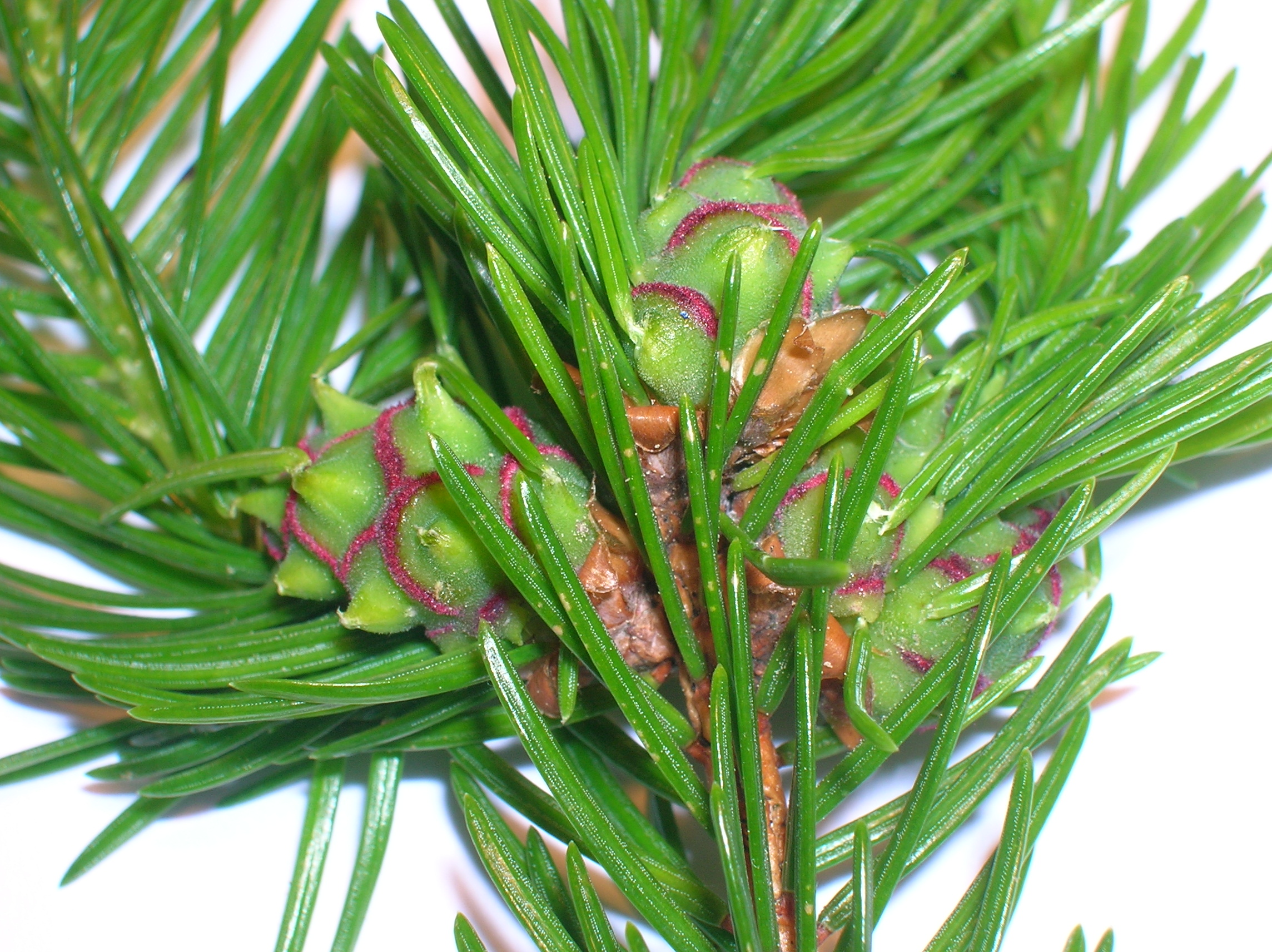
A developing pineapple gall on a Norway Spruce.

Only females of the pineapple gall adelgid are known. In spring, the newly hatched nymphs formed from over-wintered eggs feed at the bases of the growing needles; the induced swellings eventually coalesce to form the pseudocone structure, each cell of which contains about twelve nymphs. The nymphs overwinter under wax threads at the base of buds.

In late summer (July–September) the fully developed nymphs emerge from the galls and crawl out onto the needles, where they molt and develop wings. These adult adelgids may fly to other susceptible conifers, such as larch (Larix), pine (Pinus) and silver fir (Abies alba) or may continue the cycle on the same tree, as some are poor flyers. They die shortly afterwards, leaving the eggs, which resemble white, cottony twigs, protected beneath their bodies. Several generations are raised on these secondary hosts, however no galls are formed. In July of the following year winged adelgid appear and fly to the spruces to breed there again, completing the life cycle.

== Gall forming insects ==
Some herbivorous insects create their own microhabitats by forming a highly distinctive plant structure called a gall, made up of plant tissue, but controlled by the insect. Galls act as both the habitat, and food sources for the maker of the gall. The interior of a bedeguar gall is formed from the bud, and is composed of edible nutritious and structural tissues. Some galls act as "physiologic sinks", concentrating resources in the gall from the surrounding plant parts. Galls may also provide the insect with some physical protection from predators.

== Infestations of pineapple galls ==
Galls interfere with the natural formation of twigs and cause curling, stunting and the eventual death of new growth. Heavy infestations give the trees a ragged, unsightly appearance. Thus galls prevent twig growth and, if they are abundant, may affect entire trees. Individual trees vary in susceptibility to attack; some appear immune, others suffer growth reduction, and some are eventually killed. By itself, gall growth rarely causes lasting damage, but tends to leave affected trees susceptible to other health problems, including infestation of disease causing organisms and other harmful insects. Trees growing on good sites are generally less susceptible to attack than those on poor sites.

== Control ==
Removal and destruction of newly formed galls will reduce adelgid populations. Although old galls can be unsightly, their removal will not affect adelgid populations because the organisms have already emerged from these galls. On small trees, galled shoot tips can be pruned, but generally, this is a pest that can be tolerated.

=== Biological control ===
There are no known effective parasites or predators of Adelges abietis. Specimen trees in gardens may be afforded a degree of protection by hanging up fat balls to encourage tits which will also feed on the adelgid gall formers.

=== Pesticides ===
If control measures are required, spray with bifenthrin on a dry, mild day in late February to control the overwintering generation. Some insecticides can be applied early, preventing gall formation and insect colonization.

== See also ==
- Alder tongue gall
- Gall
- Knopper gall
- Oak apple
- Oak artichoke gall
- Oak marble gall
