= Calvia breiti =

Scientific classification
- Kingdom: Animalia
- Phylum: Arthropoda
- Clade: Pancrustacea
- Class: Insecta
- Order: Coleoptera
- Suborder: Polyphaga
- Infraorder: Cucujiformia
- Family: Coccinellidae
- Genus: Calvia
- Species: C. breiti

Binomial name
- Calvia breiti Mader, 1932

Species of beetle

Calvia breiti is a species of beetle of the family Coccinellidae. It is found in India (Himachal Pradesh, Jammu & Kashmir, Sikkim, Uttarakhand, Uttar Pradesh), Pakistan, Nepal, Bhutan and southern China.

== Description ==
Adults reach a length of about 6.3–6.55 mm (0.248–0.258 in). They are dull yellow to yellowish brown, with black markings on the pronotum and elytra. The ventral surface is mostly yellowish brown.

== Life history ==
They have been recorded preying on Adelges species.
