= Adelges viridanus =

Scientific classification
- Kingdom: Animalia
- Phylum: Arthropoda
- Clade: Pancrustacea
- Class: Insecta
- Order: Hemiptera
- Suborder: Sternorrhyncha
- Superfamily: Phylloxeroidea
- Family: Adelgidae
- Genus: Adelges
- Species: A. viridanus

Binomial name
- Adelges viridanus (Cholodkovsky, 1896)

Synonyms
- Chermes viridanus Cholodkovsky, 1896; Chermes laricicola Shinji, 1930; Cholodkovskya viridana (Cholodkovsky, 1896); Adelges viridana (Cholodkovsky, 1896); Adelges (Adelges) viridana Adelges (Cholodkovskya) viridanus (Cholodkovsky, 1896); Pineus viridana (Cholodkovsky, 1896); Pineus viridanus (Cholodkovsky, 1896)

Species of true bug

Adelges viridanus is a species in the Adelgidae family, and in the subgenus, Cholodkovsya. It was first described in 1896 by Nikolai Alexandrovich Cholodkovsky as Chermes viridanus.

In his description, Cholodkovsky says that it "differs from Chermes viridis in that its nymphs develop not on the needles but on the bark" of the larch and it "appears to belong to the exclusively parthenogenetic species and, what is particularly remarkable, lives exclusively on the larch".

It is found on the Korean Peninsula, and in Japan (listed as an injurious pest under the name Chermes laricicola).
