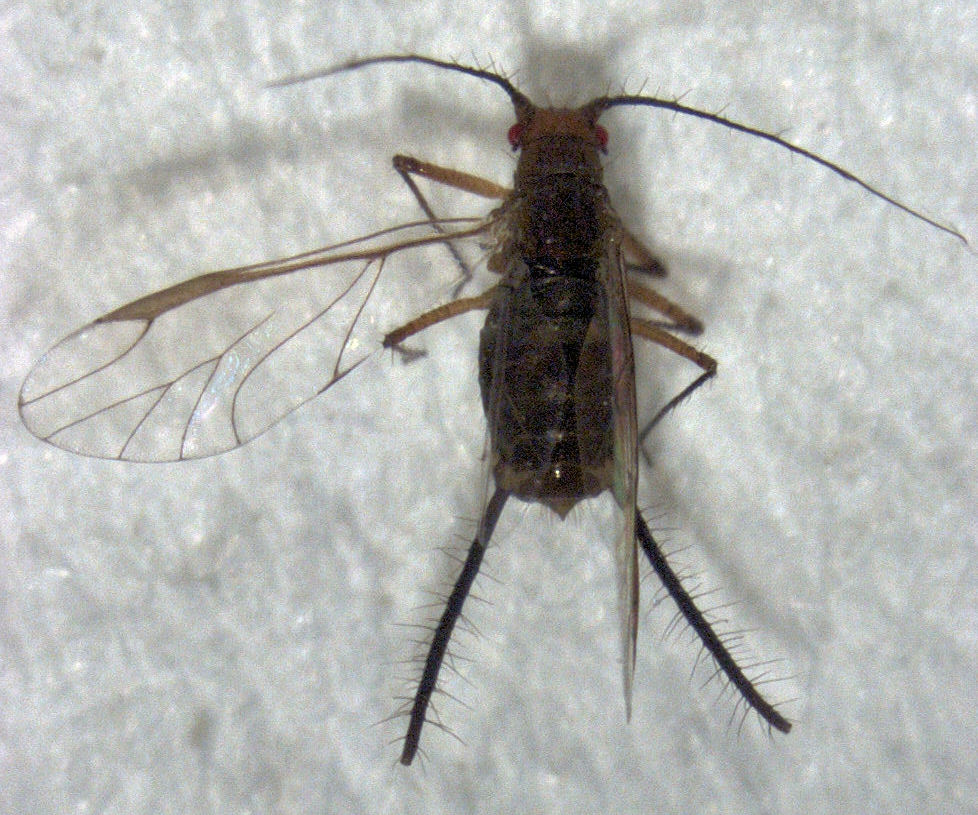
- Greenidea ficicola

Scientific classification
- Domain: Eukaryota
- Kingdom: Animalia
- Phylum: Arthropoda
- Class: Insecta
- Order: Hemiptera
- Suborder: Sternorrhyncha
- Superfamily: Aphidoidea
- Family: Aphididae
- Subfamily: Greenideinae; Baker, 1920

Tribes
- Cervaphidini; Greenideini; Schoutedeniini

= Greenideinae =

Subfamily of true bugs

Greenideinae is a subfamily of the family Aphididae.

== Genera ==
=== Tribe: Cervaphidini ===
Anomalaphis - Anomalosiphum - Brasilaphis - Cervaphis - Meringosiphon - Sumatraphis

=== Tribe: Greenideini ===
Allotrichosiphum - Eutrichosiphum - Greenidea - Greenideoida - Mesotrichosiphum - Mollitrichosiphum - Tritrichosiphum

=== Tribe: Schoutedeniini ===
Eonaphis - Paulianaphis - Schoutedenia
