= Calvia vulnerata =

Scientific classification
- Kingdom: Animalia
- Phylum: Arthropoda
- Clade: Pancrustacea
- Class: Insecta
- Order: Coleoptera
- Suborder: Polyphaga
- Infraorder: Cucujiformia
- Family: Coccinellidae
- Genus: Calvia
- Species: C. vulnerata

Binomial name
- Calvia vulnerata (Hope, 1831)

Synonyms
- Coccinella vulnerata Hope, 1831; Coccinella uniramosa Hope, 1831; Calvia flaccida Mulsant, 1853; Anisocalvia vishnu Crotch, 1874; Anisocalvia krishna Crotch, 1874; Anisocalvia buddha Crotch, 1874

Species of beetle

Calvia vulnerata is a species of beetle of the family Coccinellidae. It is found in India (Sikkim, West Bengal, Uttarakhand, Delhi), Bhutan, Nepal and China.

== Description ==
Adults reach a length of about 6.7–7 mm (0.26–0.28 in). They are highly variable, with the ground colour of the elytra ranging from pale pinkish or yellow to yellowish brown or darker reddish brown or even black, usually with six yellow or black spots.

== Life history ==
They have been recorded preying on aphids.
