= Greenidea psidii =

Scientific classification
- Domain: Eukaryota
- Kingdom: Animalia
- Phylum: Arthropoda
- Class: Insecta
- Order: Hemiptera
- Suborder: Sternorrhyncha
- Family: Aphididae
- Genus: Greenidea
- Species: G. psidii

Binomial name
- Greenidea psidii van der Goot, 1917

Synonyms
- Greenidea formosana (Maki, 1917)

Species of true bug

Greenidea psidii, also known as Greenidea (Trichosiphum) psidii, is an aphid in the order Hemiptera.
