= Calvia flaveola =

Scientific classification
- Kingdom: Animalia
- Phylum: Arthropoda
- Clade: Pancrustacea
- Class: Insecta
- Order: Coleoptera
- Suborder: Polyphaga
- Infraorder: Cucujiformia
- Family: Coccinellidae
- Genus: Calvia
- Species: C. flaveola

Binomial name
- Calvia flaveola Booth, 1997

Species of beetle

Calvia flaveola is a species of beetle of the family Coccinellidae. It is found in India (Uttarakhand, Jammu & Kashmir), Pakistan, Afghanistan and Myanmar.

== Description ==
Adults reach a length of about 5.7–6.6 mm (0.22–0.26 in). The dorsal surface is pale yellow, the elytra sometimes with three brighter yellow stripes. The ventral surface is pale yellow.

== Life history ==
They have been recorded preying on various aphid species, including Macrosiphoniella pseudoartemisiae.
