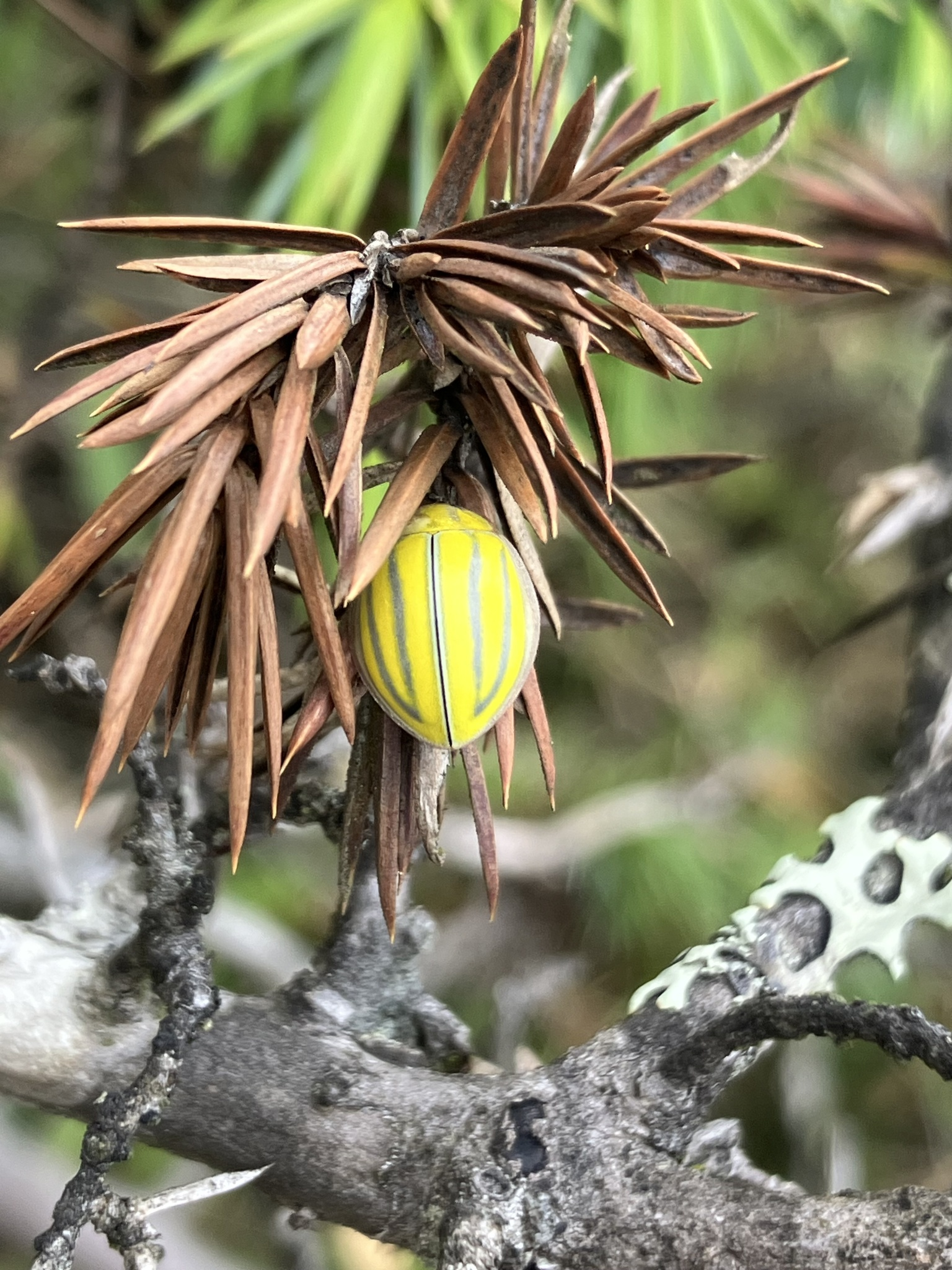

Scientific classification
- Kingdom: Animalia
- Phylum: Arthropoda
- Clade: Pancrustacea
- Class: Insecta
- Order: Coleoptera
- Suborder: Polyphaga
- Infraorder: Cucujiformia
- Family: Coccinellidae
- Genus: Calvia
- Species: C. championorum

Binomial name
- Calvia championorum Booth, 1997

= Calvia championorum =

Species of beetle

Calvia championorum is a species of beetle of the family Coccinellidae. It is found in India (Uttarakhand), China and Bhutan.

== Description ==
Adults reach a length of about 6.5–8 mm (0.26–0.31 in). The dorsal surface is dull yellow to brownish yellow, sometimes with paler longitudinal stripes on the elytra. The pronotum has a vague browner M-shaped mark. The underside is slightly darker brownish-yellow.
