= Sacchiphantes =

Scientific classification
- Domain: Eukaryota
- Kingdom: Animalia
- Phylum: Arthropoda
- Class: Insecta
- Order: Hemiptera
- Suborder: Sternorrhyncha
- Family: Adelgidae
- Genus: Sacchiphantes; Curtis, 1844

Genus of true bugs

Sacchiphantes is a genus of true bugs belonging to the family Adelgidae.

Species:

- Sacchiphantes abietis
- Sacchiphantes segregis
- Sacchiphantes viridis
