= Psacothea rubra =

Scientific classification
- Domain: Eukaryota
- Kingdom: Animalia
- Phylum: Arthropoda
- Class: Insecta
- Order: Coleoptera
- Suborder: Polyphaga
- Infraorder: Cucujiformia
- Family: Cerambycidae
- Tribe: Lamiini
- Genus: Psacothea
- Species: P. rubra

Binomial name
- Psacothea rubra Gressitt, 1938

Species of beetle

Psacothea rubra is a species of beetle in the family Cerambycidae. It was described by Gressitt in 1938. It is known from China.
