= Calvia tricolor =

Scientific classification
- Kingdom: Animalia
- Phylum: Arthropoda
- Clade: Pancrustacea
- Class: Insecta
- Order: Coleoptera
- Suborder: Polyphaga
- Infraorder: Cucujiformia
- Family: Coccinellidae
- Genus: Calvia
- Species: C. tricolor

Binomial name
- Calvia tricolor Korschefsky, 1940

Species of beetle

Calvia tricolor is a species of beetle of the family Coccinellidae. It is found in India (Manipur, Meghalaya, Sikkim, West Bengal).

== Description ==
Adults reach a length of about 5.5–6.5 mm (0.22–0.26 in). The head is yellow and the pronotum is chestnut brown with yellow lateral margins. The elytra are dark chestnut brown, each elytron with three creamy white to yellow spots.

== Life history ==
They have been recorded preying on eggs of Urostylis punctigera.
