= Cervaphis =

Scientific classification
- Kingdom: Animalia
- Phylum: Arthropoda
- Clade: Pancrustacea
- Class: Insecta
- Order: Hemiptera
- Suborder: Sternorrhyncha
- Family: Aphididae
- Subfamily: Greenideinae
- Tribe: Cervaphidini
- Genus: Cervaphis van der Goot, 1917

Genus of true bugs

Cervaphis is a genus of aphids of the family Aphididae.

== Species ==
Species accepted as of April 2025:

- Cervaphis echinata Hille Ris Lambers, 1956
- Cervaphis lujiangensis Qiao & Zhang, 2000
- Cervaphis quercus Takahashi, 1918
- Cervaphis rappardi Hille Ris Lambers, 1956
- Cervaphis schouteniae van der Goot, 1917
