= Psacothea nigrostigma =

Scientific classification
- Domain: Eukaryota
- Kingdom: Animalia
- Phylum: Arthropoda
- Class: Insecta
- Order: Coleoptera
- Suborder: Polyphaga
- Infraorder: Cucujiformia
- Family: Cerambycidae
- Tribe: Lamiini
- Genus: Psacothea
- Species: P. nigrostigma

Binomial name
- Psacothea nigrostigma Wang, Chiang & Zheng, 2002

Species of beetle

Psacothea nigrostigma is a species of beetle in the family Cerambycidae. It was described by Wang, Chiang and Zheng in 2002.
