= Dreyfusia =

Scientific classification
- Domain: Eukaryota
- Kingdom: Animalia
- Phylum: Arthropoda
- Class: Insecta
- Order: Hemiptera
- Suborder: Sternorrhyncha
- Family: Adelgidae
- Genus: Dreyfusia; Börner, 1908

Genus of true bugs

Dreyfusia is a genus of true bugs belonging to the family Adelgidae.

Species:

- Dreyfusia merkeri
- Dreyfusia nebrodensis
- Dreyfusia nordmannianae
- Dreyfusia piceae
- Dreyfusia prelli
