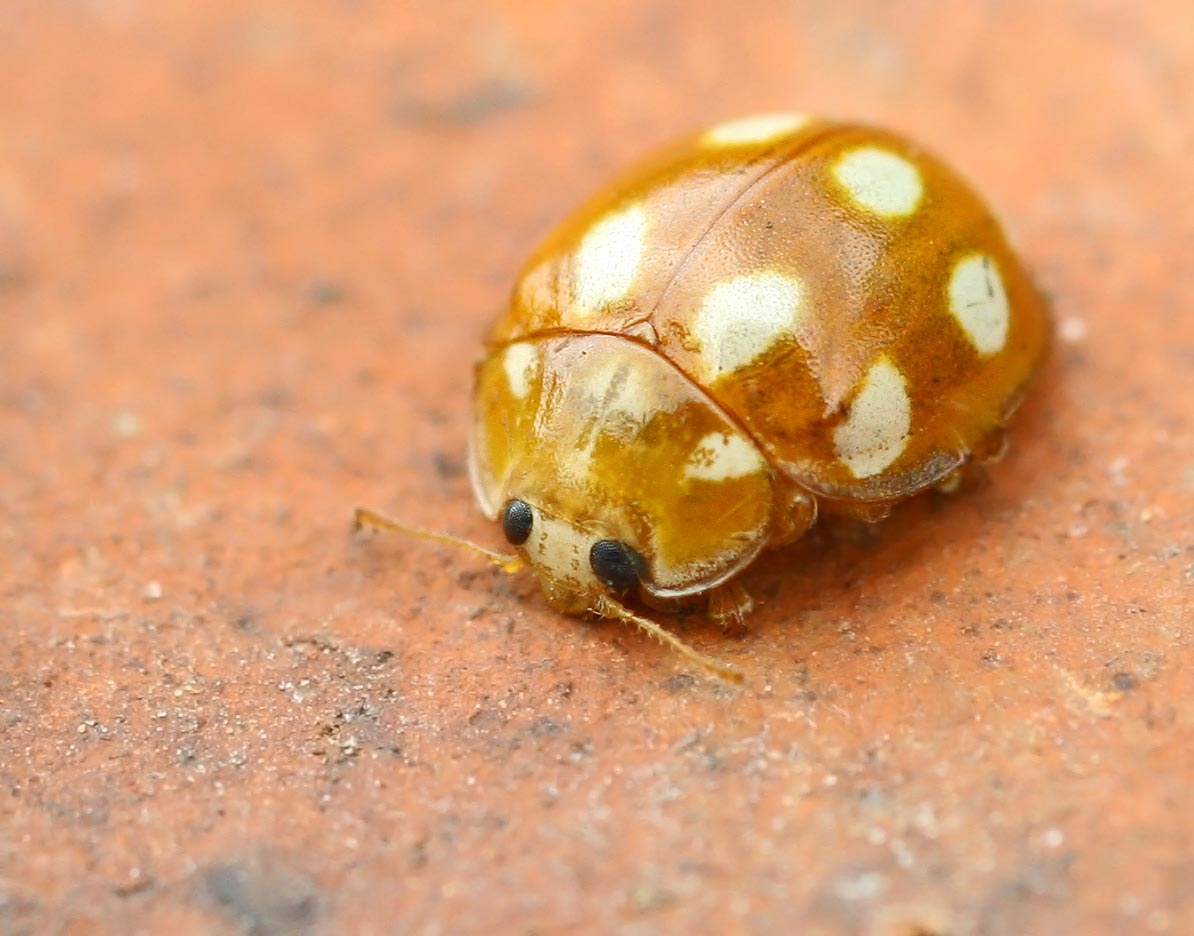
- Calvia decemguttata

Scientific classification
- Kingdom: Animalia
- Phylum: Arthropoda
- Clade: Pancrustacea
- Class: Insecta
- Order: Coleoptera
- Suborder: Polyphaga
- Infraorder: Cucujiformia
- Family: Coccinellidae
- Tribe: Coccinellini
- Genus: Calvia; Mulsant, 1850

Synonyms
- Anisocalvia Crotch, 1871; Eocaria Timberlake, 1943

= Calvia (beetle) =

Genus of beetles

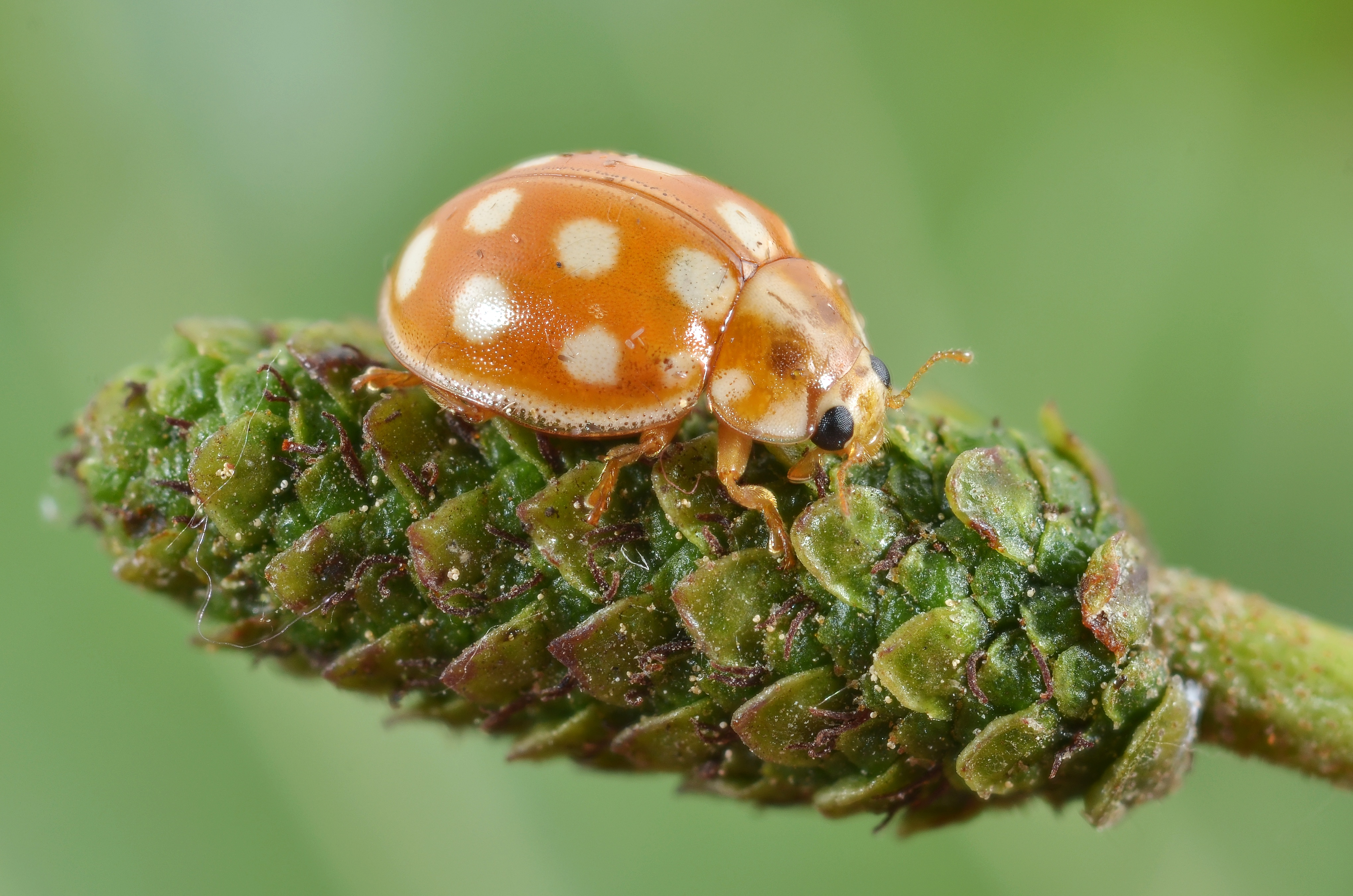
Calvia quindecimguttata

Calvia is a genus of lady beetles in the family Coccinellidae. There are about 10 described species in Calvia.

== Species ==
These species belong to the genus Calvia:

- Calvia albida Bielawski, 1972
- Calvia andrewesi (Weise, 1908)
- Calvia breiti Mader, 1932
- Calvia championorum Booth, 1997
- Calvia chinensis (Mulsant, 1850)
- Calvia decemguttata (Linnaeus, 1767)
- Calvia explanata Poorani, 2014
- Calvia flaveola Booth, 1997
- Calvia monosha Bielawski, 1979
- Calvia muiri (Timberlake, 1943)
- Calvia parvinotata (Miyatake, 1959)
- Calvia punctata (Mulsant, 1853)
- Calvia quatuordecimguttata (Linnaeus, 1758) (cream-spotted lady beetle)
- Calvia quindecimguttata (Fabricius, 1777)
- Calvia septenaria Mulsant, 1866
- Calvia shirozui (Miyatake, 1965)
- Calvia shiva Kapur, 1963
- Calvia sichuanica Kovář, 2007
- Calvia sykesii (Crotch, 1874)
- Calvia tricolor Korschefsky, 1940
- Calvia vulnerata (Hope, 1831)

== Selected former species ==
- Calvia connexa Miyatake, 1985
