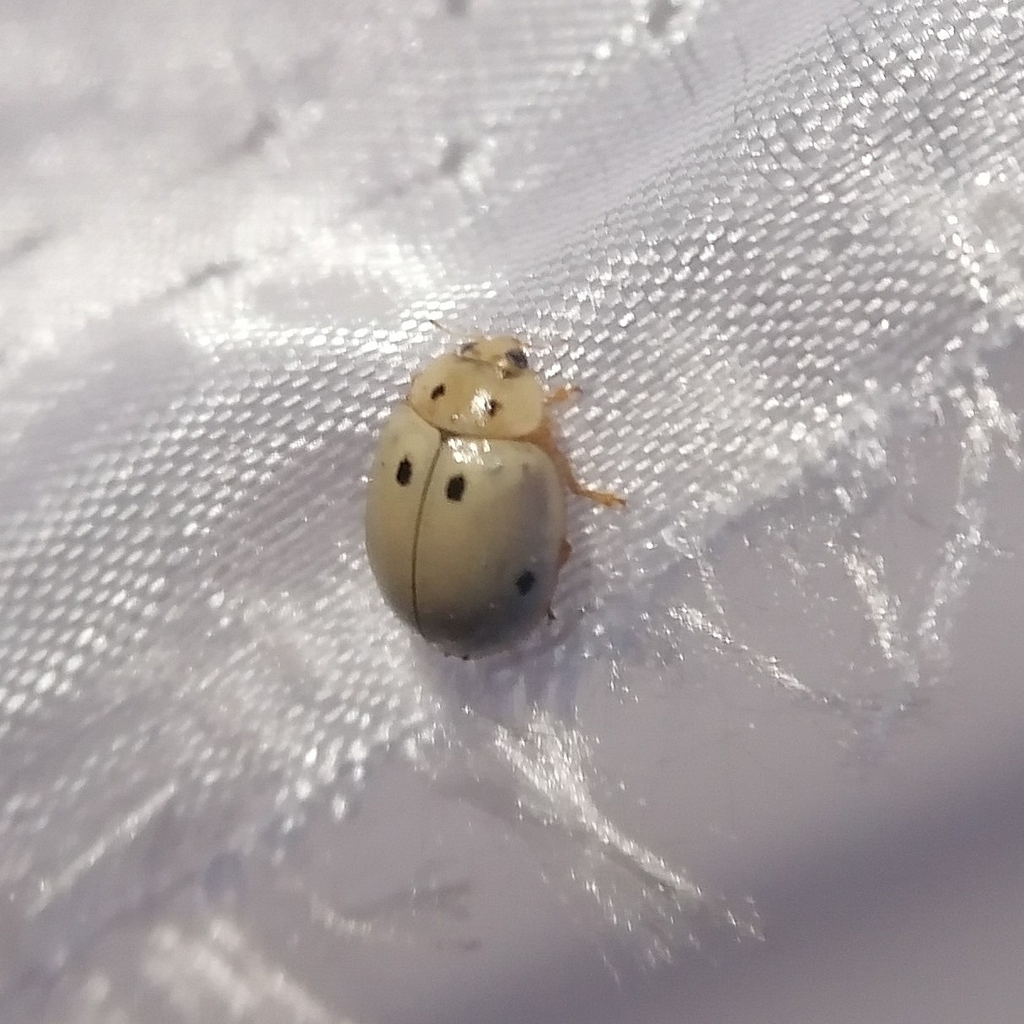

Scientific classification
- Kingdom: Animalia
- Phylum: Arthropoda
- Clade: Pancrustacea
- Class: Insecta
- Order: Coleoptera
- Suborder: Polyphaga
- Infraorder: Cucujiformia
- Family: Coccinellidae
- Genus: Calvia
- Species: C. punctata

Binomial name
- Calvia punctata (Mulsant, 1853)

Synonyms
- Harmonia punctata Mulsant, 1853; Propylea obversepunctata Mulsant, 1853; Halyzia quatuordecimguttata var. nigripennis Fleischer, 1900; Halyzia quatuordecimguttata var. concolor Penecke, 1901; Calvia duplicipuncta Semenov & Dobzhansky, 1922

= Calvia punctata =

Species of beetle

Calvia punctata is a species of beetle of the family Coccinellidae. It is found in India (Himachal Pradesh, Jammu & Kashmir, Uttar Pradesh, Uttarakhand), Pakistan, Nepal, Afghanistan and central Asia.

== Description ==
Adults reach a length of about 5–5.8 mm (0.20–0.23 in). The head is yellowish and the pronotum black with yellowish borders. The pattern on the elytra is very variable and the ground colour ranges from dull yellow to black. The most common form has yellow elytra with six black spots.

== Life history ==
They have been recorded preying on various Aphididae species.
