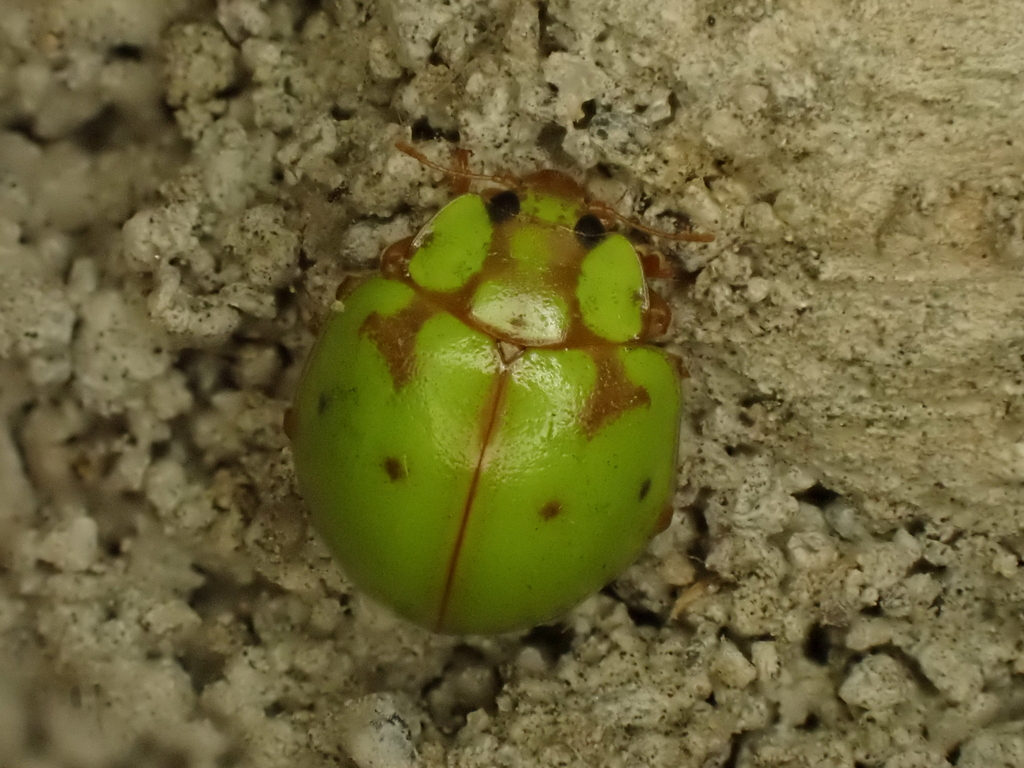

Scientific classification
- Kingdom: Animalia
- Phylum: Arthropoda
- Clade: Pancrustacea
- Class: Insecta
- Order: Coleoptera
- Suborder: Polyphaga
- Infraorder: Cucujiformia
- Family: Coccinellidae
- Genus: Calvia
- Species: C. sykesii

Binomial name
- Calvia sykesii (Crotch, 1874)

Synonyms
- Anisocalvia sykesii Crotch, 1874

= Calvia sykesii =

Species of beetle

Calvia sykesii is a species of beetle of the family Coccinellidae. It is found in India (Arunachal Pradesh, Assam, Manipur, Meghalaya, Sikkim, West Bengal), Nepal and Bhutan.

== Description ==
Adults reach a length of about 6.3–6.54 mm (0.248–0.257 in). They are lime green with pale reddish-brown markings.

== Life history ==
They have been recorded preying on various aphids, including Taoia indica.
