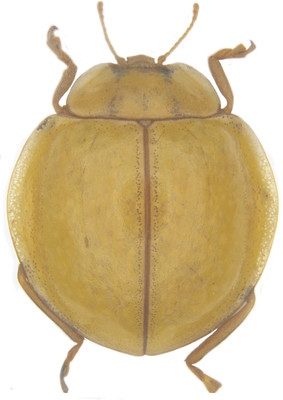

Scientific classification
- Kingdom: Animalia
- Phylum: Arthropoda
- Clade: Pancrustacea
- Class: Insecta
- Order: Coleoptera
- Suborder: Polyphaga
- Infraorder: Cucujiformia
- Family: Coccinellidae
- Genus: Calvia
- Species: C. explanata

Binomial name
- Calvia explanata Poorani, 2014

= Calvia explanata =

Species of beetle

Calvia explanata is a species of beetle of the family Coccinellidae. It is found in India (Manipur, Sikkim, Tripura, West Bengal) and Nepal.

== Description ==
Adults reach a length of about 7.5–9 mm (0.30–0.35 in). They are lemon green with a yellowish-white mottled pattern.

== Life history ==
They have been recorded preying on Taoia indica.
