= Calvia monosha =

Scientific classification
- Kingdom: Animalia
- Phylum: Arthropoda
- Clade: Pancrustacea
- Class: Insecta
- Order: Coleoptera
- Suborder: Polyphaga
- Infraorder: Cucujiformia
- Family: Coccinellidae
- Genus: Calvia
- Species: C. monosha

Binomial name
- Calvia monosha Bielawski, 1979

Species of beetle

Calvia monosha is a species of beetle of the family Coccinellidae. It is found in Bhutan.

== Description ==
Adults reach a length of about 6.7–7 mm (0.26–0.28 in). The elytra are black with yellow basal and external margins and five yellow spots.
