= Greenidea artocarpi =

Scientific classification
- Kingdom: Animalia
- Phylum: Arthropoda
- Class: Insecta
- Order: Hemiptera
- Suborder: Sternorrhyncha
- Family: Aphididae
- Genus: Greenidea
- Species: G. artocarpi

Binomial name
- Greenidea artocarpi (Westwood, 1890)

Species of true bug

Greenidea artocarpi, also known as Greenidea (Greenidea) artocarpi, is an aphid in the superfamily Aphidoidea in the order Hemiptera. It is a true bug and sucks sap from plants.
