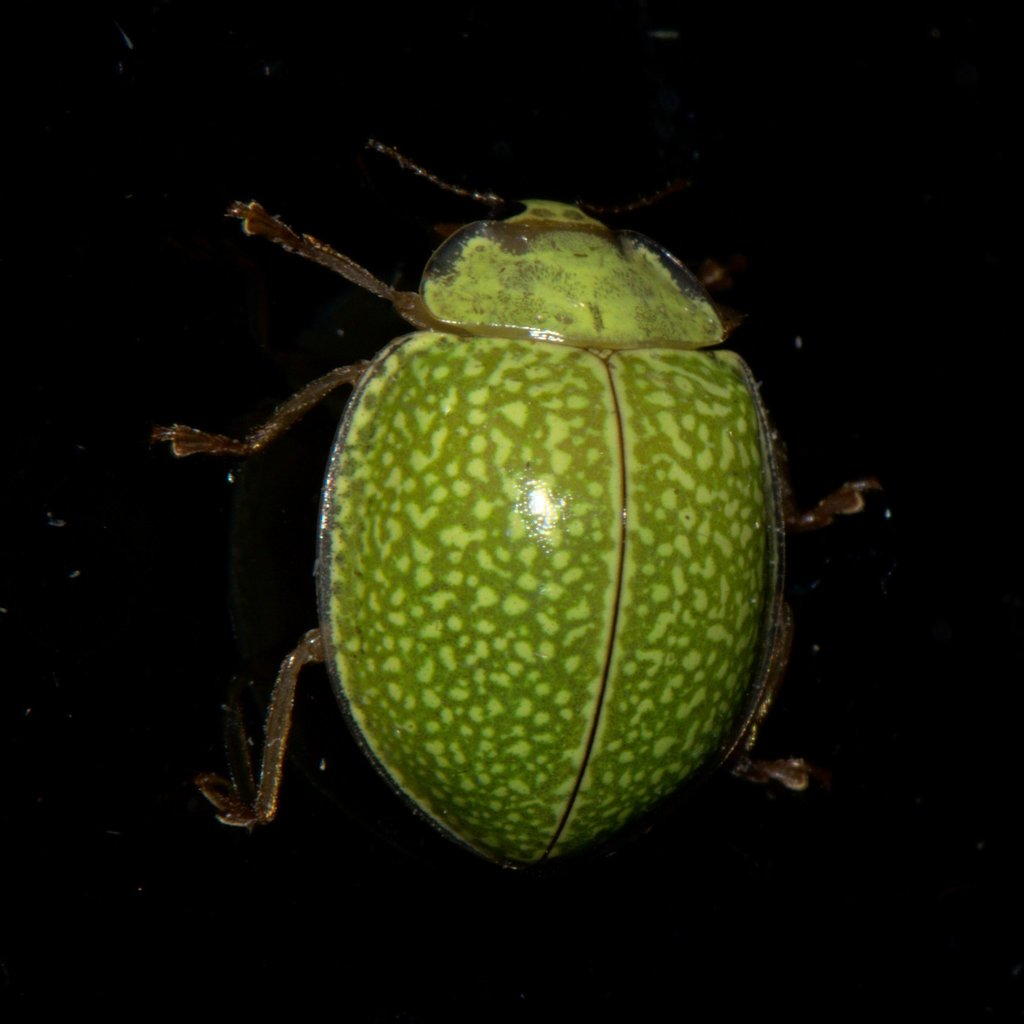

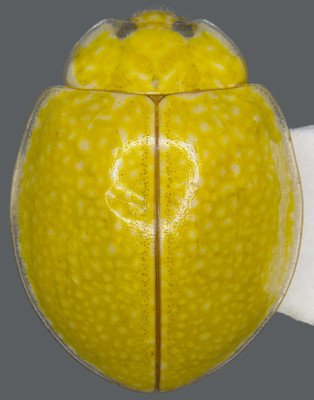

Scientific classification
- Kingdom: Animalia
- Phylum: Arthropoda
- Clade: Pancrustacea
- Class: Insecta
- Order: Coleoptera
- Suborder: Polyphaga
- Infraorder: Cucujiformia
- Family: Coccinellidae
- Genus: Calvia
- Species: C. albida

Binomial name
- Calvia albida Bielawski, 1972

Synonyms
- Halyzia maculata Jing, 1987

= Calvia albida =

Species of beetle

Calvia albida is a species of beetle of the family Coccinellidae. It is found in India (Arunachal Pradesh, Manipur, Sikkim, Uttarakhand, West Bengal), Nepal, Bhutan and China.

== Description ==
Adults reach a length of about 7–7.5 mm (0.28–0.30 in). They are lime green to yellowish green, the pronotum with a brown, M-shaped marking. The elytra are mottled with creamy white spots.

== Life history ==
They have been recorded preying on Mollitrichosiphum alni.
