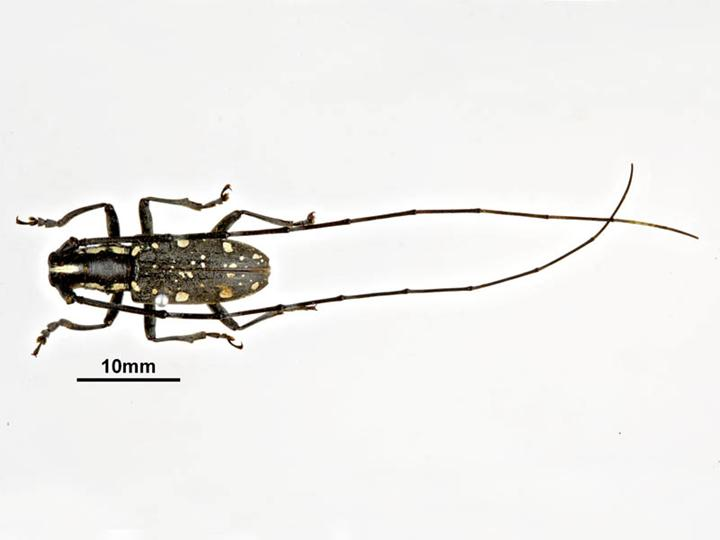
- Psacothea hilaris

Scientific classification
- Domain: Eukaryota
- Kingdom: Animalia
- Phylum: Arthropoda
- Class: Insecta
- Order: Coleoptera
- Suborder: Polyphaga
- Infraorder: Cucujiformia
- Family: Cerambycidae
- Tribe: Lamiini
- Genus: Psacothea

= Psacothea =

Genus of beetles

Psacothea is a genus of longhorn beetles of the subfamily Lamiinae, containing the following species:

- Psacothea hilaris (Pascoe, 1857) - yellow spotted longicorn beetle
- Psacothea nigrostigma Wang, Chiang & Zheng, 2002
- Psacothea rubra Gressitt, 1938
