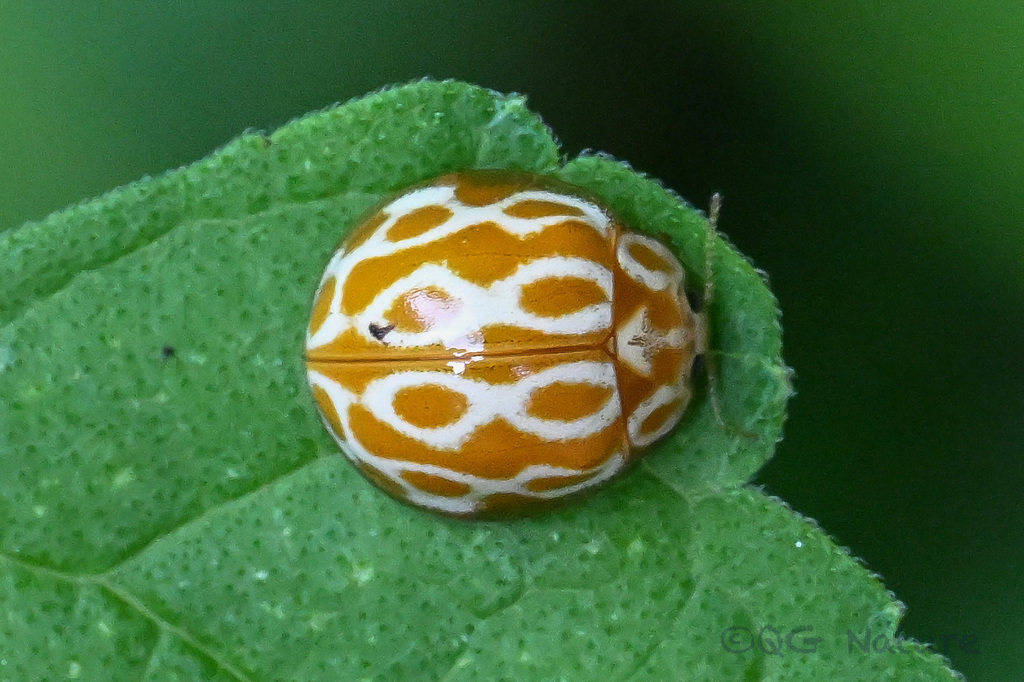

Scientific classification
- Kingdom: Animalia
- Phylum: Arthropoda
- Clade: Pancrustacea
- Class: Insecta
- Order: Coleoptera
- Suborder: Polyphaga
- Infraorder: Cucujiformia
- Family: Coccinellidae
- Genus: Calvia
- Species: C. sichuanica

Binomial name
- Calvia sichuanica Kovář, 2007

Synonyms
- Calvia sicardi Mader, 1930 (preocc.)

= Calvia sichuanica =

Species of beetle

Calvia sichuanica is a species of beetle of the family Coccinellidae. It is found in India (Manipur, Nagaland), Myanmar and China.

== Description ==
Adults reach a length of about 5.7–6.5 mm (0.22–0.26 in). They are ochreous yellow to reddish brown. The pronotum is creamy whitish to yellow with two pairs of ochreous or reddish-brown maculae. The pattern on the elytra consists of ochreous or reddish brown spots with creamy yellow borders forming two longitudinal rows of spots.
