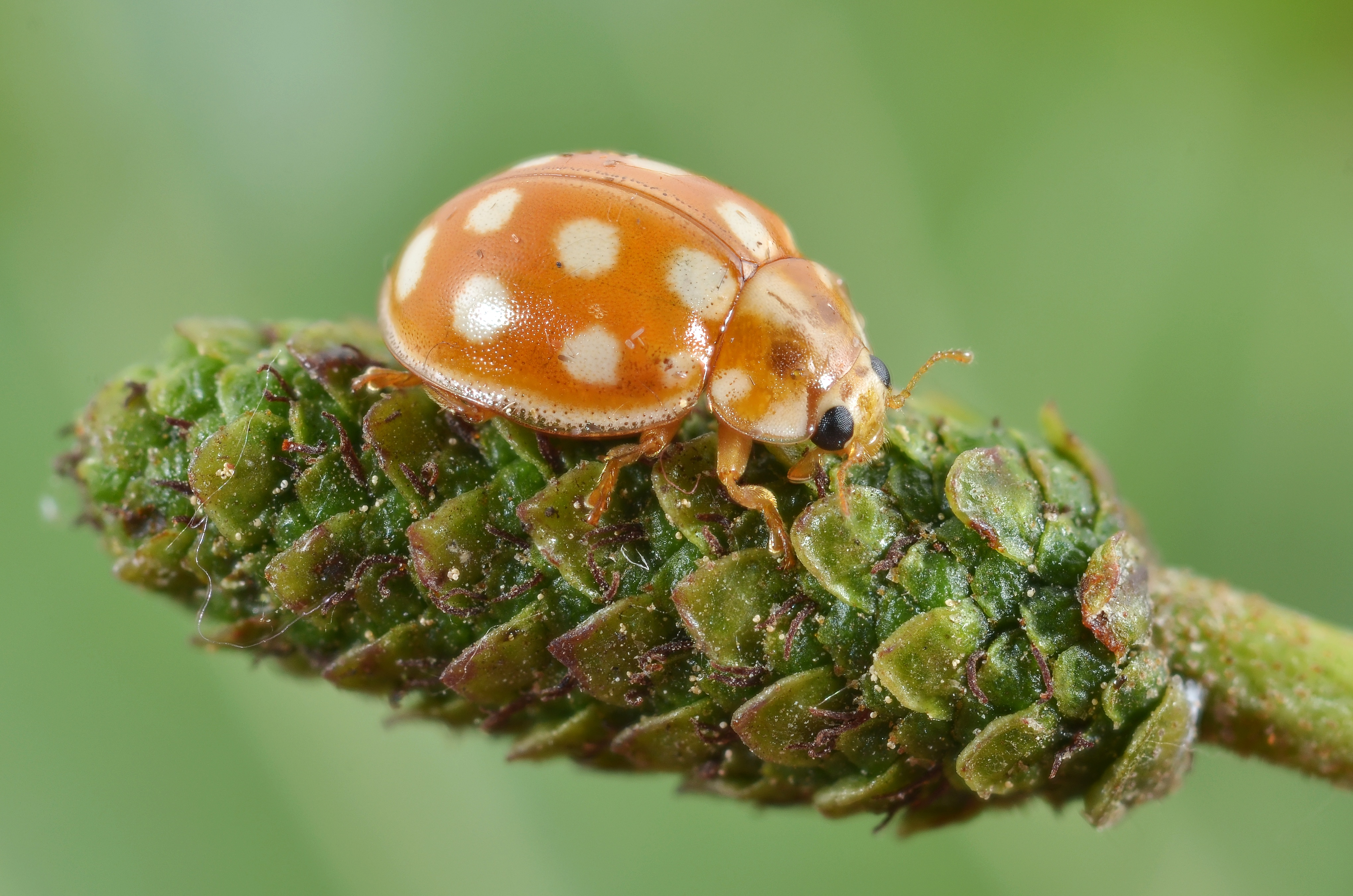

Scientific classification
- Kingdom: Animalia
- Phylum: Arthropoda
- Clade: Pancrustacea
- Class: Insecta
- Order: Coleoptera
- Suborder: Polyphaga
- Infraorder: Cucujiformia
- Family: Coccinellidae
- Genus: Calvia
- Species: C. quindecimguttata

Binomial name
- Calvia quindecimguttata (Fabricius, 1777)

Synonyms
- Coccinella quindecimguttata Fabricius, 1777; Coccinella albomarginata Goeze, 1777; Coccinella bisseptemguttata Schaller, 1783; Coccinella marginata Geoffroy in Fourcroy, 1785; Coccinella duodecimgemmata Herbst, 1793; Coccinella bisseptempunctata Percheron, 1835; Vibidia murasei Ohta, 1929

= Calvia quindecimguttata =

Species of beetle

Calvia quindecimguttata is a species of beetle of the family Coccinellidae. It is found in India, Japan, China, Mongolia and Europe.

== Description ==
The colour of the dorsal surface ranges from straw yellow to ochreous or orange yellow. The pronotum has an ochreous M-shaped marking and the elytra have 14 white spots on each elytron.
