= Aphrastasia =

Scientific classification
- Domain: Eukaryota
- Kingdom: Animalia
- Phylum: Arthropoda
- Class: Insecta
- Order: Hemiptera
- Suborder: Sternorrhyncha
- Family: Adelgidae
- Genus: Aphrastasia; Börner, 1909
- Species: A. funitecta

Binomial name
- Aphrastasia funitecta Dreyfus, 1888

Synonyms
- Chermes funitecta Dreyfus, 1888

Genus of true bugs

Aphrastasia is a genus of true bugs belonging to the family Adelgidae. The genus is monotypic, with the only species being Aphrastasia funitecta.

The genus was first described by Börner in 1909.
