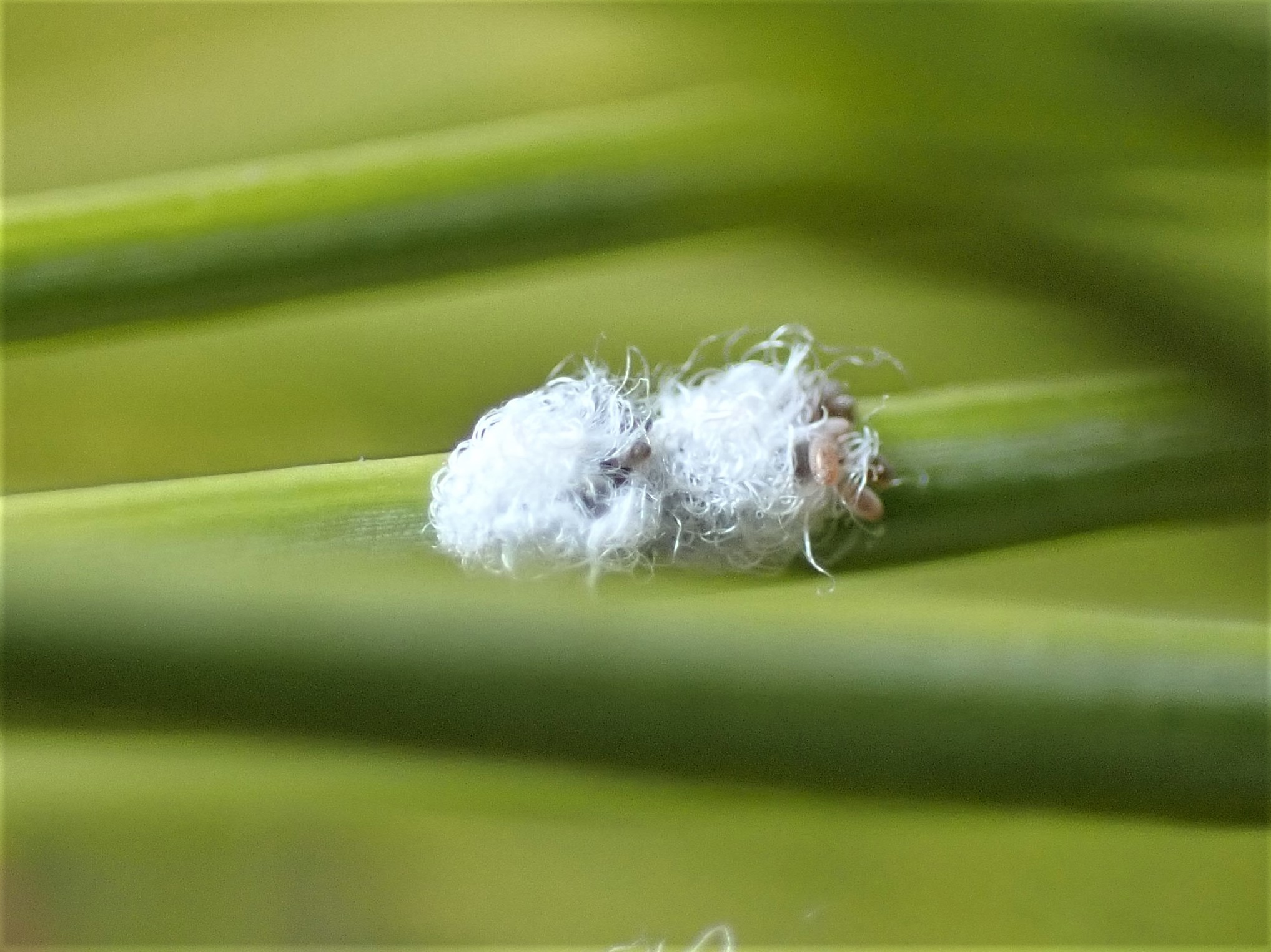
- Two individuals in British Columbia

Scientific classification
- Kingdom: Animalia
- Phylum: Arthropoda
- Clade: Pancrustacea
- Class: Insecta
- Order: Hemiptera
- Suborder: Sternorrhyncha
- Family: Adelgidae
- Genus: Adelges
- Species: A. cooleyi

Binomial name
- Adelges cooleyi (Gillette, 1907)

= Gall adelgid =

Species of true bug

The gall adelgid (Adelges cooleyi) is an adelgid species that produces galls in spruce trees. They infect the new buds of native spruce trees in the foothills of the Rocky Mountains in the spring. They also attack blue spruce to a lesser degree. The insects complete two generations within the year. They require two different trees for its life cycle, the second being the Rocky Mountain Douglas-fir. They may also attack Sitka, Engelmann, or white spruce. The many different species of adelgids produce different galls on different spruce species.

The Cooley spruce gall adelgid (Adelges cooleyi Gillette) is mainly a western species that usually alternates between white spruce and Douglas fir. It is rare in eastern Canada. In Ontario, the galls are found mostly on Colorado spruce.

== Identification ==
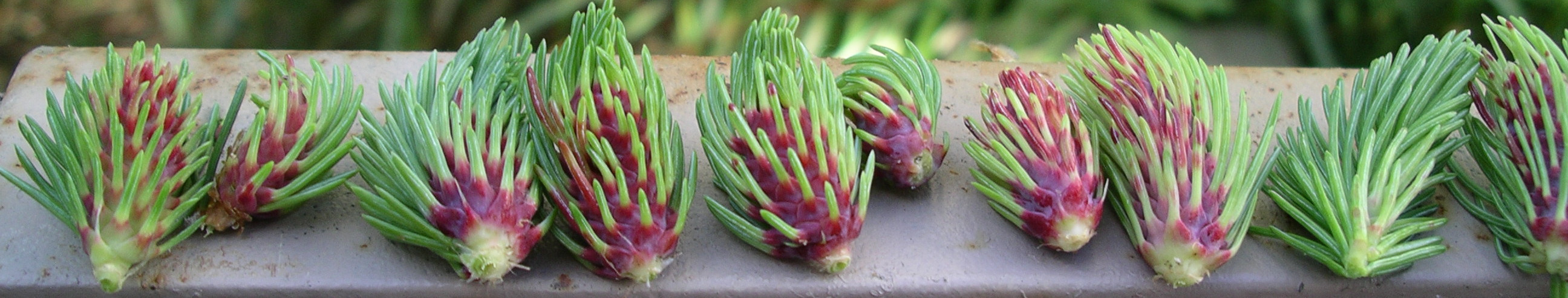
Diversity of colour of galls: They can be green, red, and purple.

The infection is most noticeable on spruce in the spring, May to June, when the galls appear. This infection may be mistakenly diagnosed to be caused by worms, grubs, or even as a sex organ of the spruce. Spruce pollen, however, is released from a smaller structure that lacks needles. The galls are characterized by this pineapple-like form, with a length of 0.5 cm to 8 cm depending on the growth capacity of the tree. Most galls take on a pink, red, or even deep purple colour while the needles usually remain green. The segments of the new bud that have this gall form will die after the aphids leave in the summer. Once on Douglas fir, the adelgids consume the needles, but do not form galls.

== Infection ==
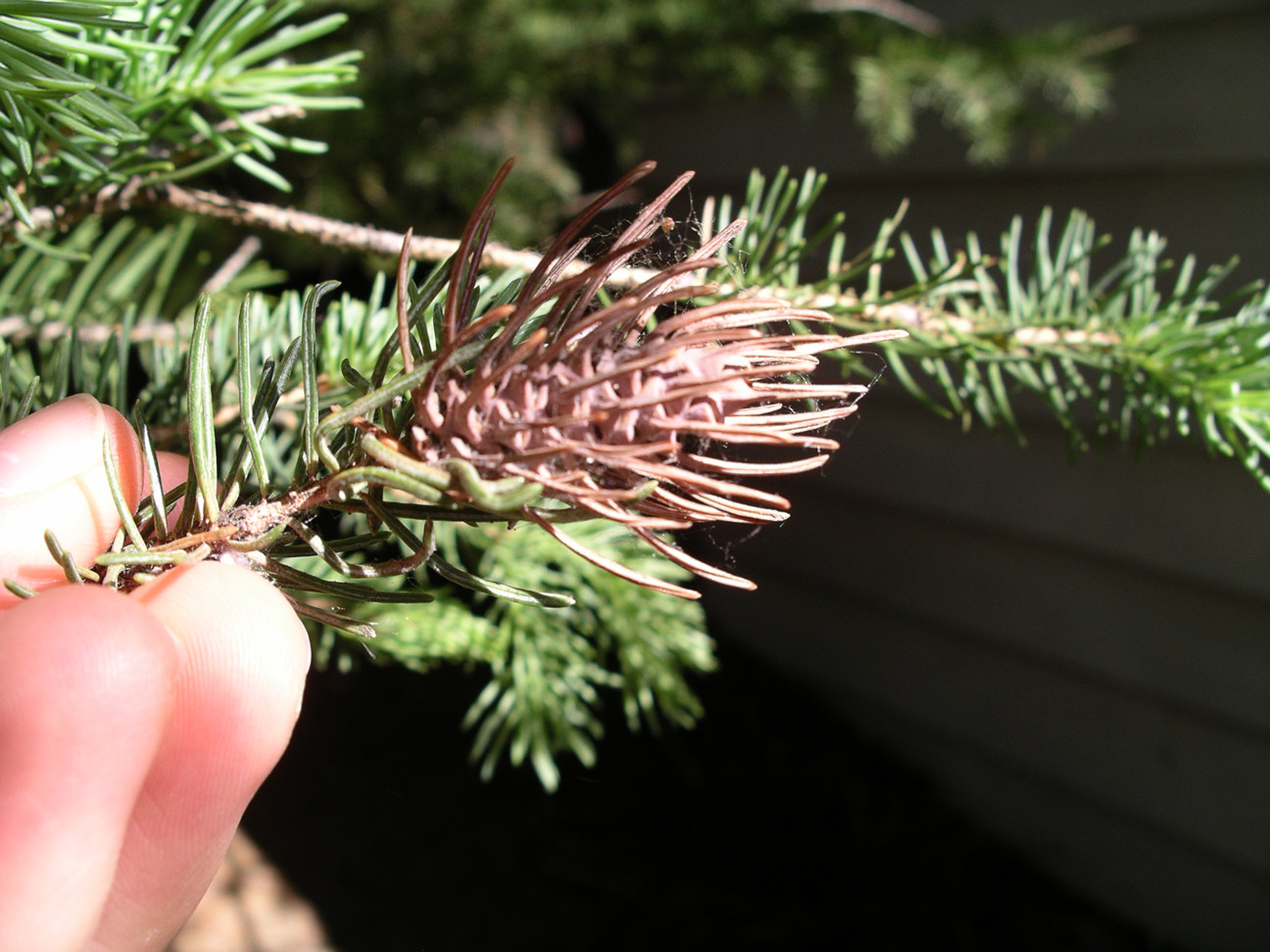
The end of a gall where infection was complete: The tissue has since become necrotic on this hardened remnant.

In the fall, the immature female adelgid, small, globular, and wingless (1.2–1.7 mm), finds a spruce on which to overwinter. In the spring when the winter thaw occurs, the female matures and lays some eggs in what resembles sacks (totalling several hundred eggs) on the branches near the developing buds. These, in fact, are not sacks, but individual tufts of white waxy threads that protect the eggs. The females prefer areas on the spruce where they have greater protection from the elements, especially wind. These female individuals have an obvious patch of white wax wool as a covering. Their mouthparts consist of thread-like stylets which are used to penetrate into vascular bundles for feeding.

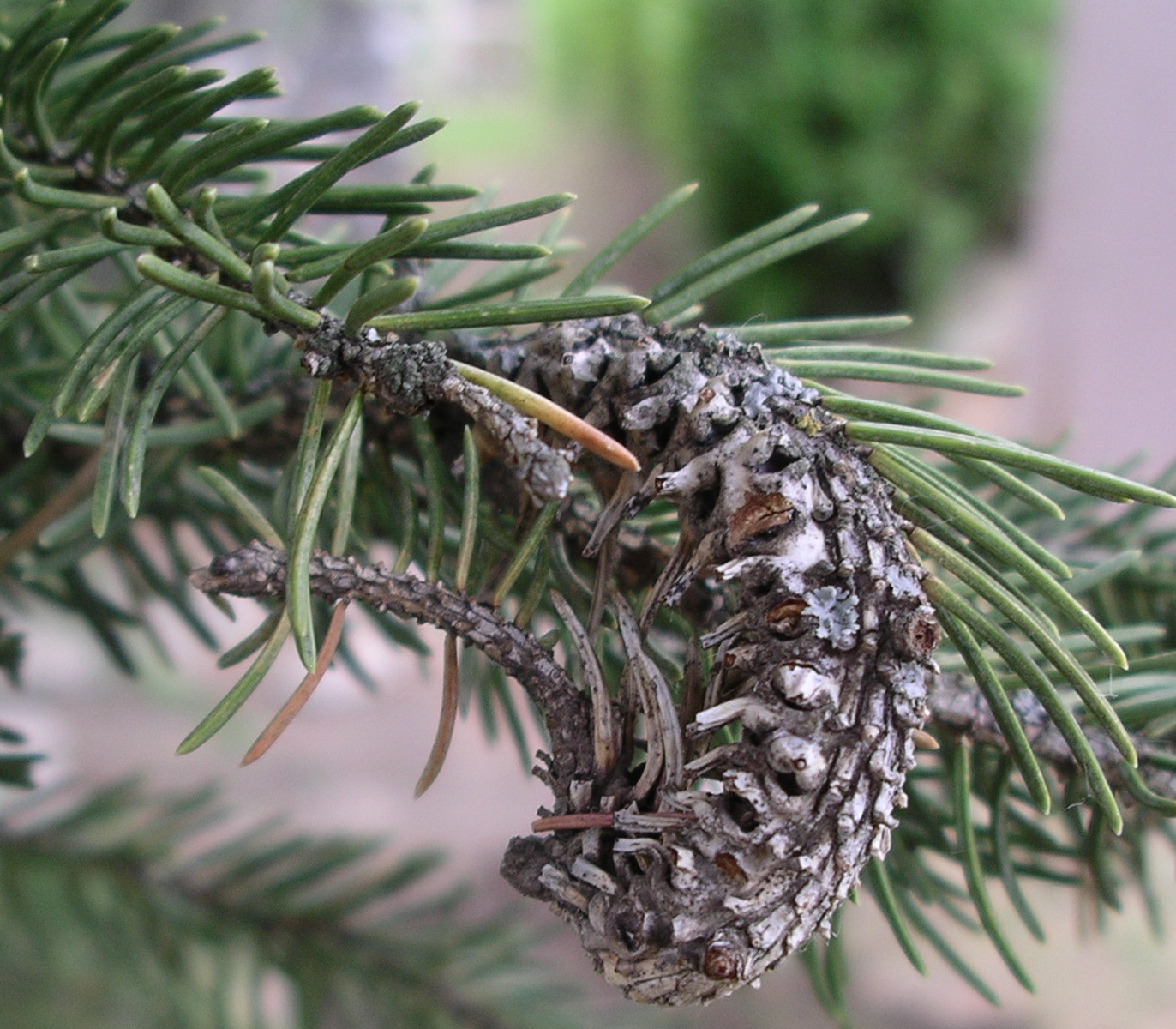
The end of a gall that had partial infection. Growth continues, but it is convoluted.

Once hatched, the young nymphs begin feeding around the base of the needles in a new bud. The nymphs' saliva introduced into the plant trigger the changes in development of the plant, distinguished by the thickening and expansion of the basal portion of needles towards the characteristic gall form. When infections are incomplete, the side of the bud facing the ground will be infected first. Only partially afflicted buds can support new growth after the affected tissue has died.

The chamber at the base of each needle is not connected with any other chamber in the gall. This differentiates this infection from that caused by the woolly adelgid genus Pineus, where the chambers are interconnected.

The nymphs are light brown when first hatched, becoming black when settled in gall chamber; they are flattened oval in shape and secrete a fringe of white wax. If a gall is opened in June, this white wax will be easily visible.

== Lifecycle ==
The lifecycle of the gall adelgid requires six life stages to complete, only two of which cause damage (larval stages), and has two migration phases between the spruce and the Douglas fir. On Douglas fir, adults are about 0.1 cm long, oval, and light to dark brown in colour. At maturity, they are completely covered with white, waxy wool and appear, from spring to fall, as stationary wool tufts on the underside of needles.^{1}

While the chambers of the galls are closed, the nymphs actively feed and increase in size. By midsummer (August to September), the galls begin to dry out, the chambers open and winged forms of the adelgids emerge. These winged adult females have dark red-brown colour, with a heavily sclerotized thorax.^{3},^{4} These leave the original tree and most migrate to Douglas-fir trees. The abandoned galls continue to dry out and harden as the plant tissue dies. These dead galls are remnants that are never used again. The gall portion of partial infections dies, while the uninfected segment can continue growth, resulting in curved and convoluted shapes.

On Douglas fir, eggs are laid on the needles and several generations of adelgids are produced. Yellow spots and bent needles result from feeding damage.^{2} The needles of lightly to moderately infested trees exhibit chlorotic mottling where individual adults have fed. Attacked needles may also be twisted. Severely infested foliage may be completely chlorotic and drop prematurely.^{1} Late in the summer, some of the woolly adelgids develop wings and fly back to spruce to deposit eggs, which produce the overwintering population. Others are wingless and remain on Douglas fir trees, where they produce other overwintering forms.^{2}

== Predation and control ==
Natural predators, such as ladybirds/ladybugs, hoverfly and lacewing larvae, spiders, and mites do reduce adelgid and aphid populations to some degree.^{4}

Spraying against these adelgids with chemicals is possible, and can be done in either the fall or the early spring. Foliar treatments of carbaryl (Sevin) and permethrin have been most effective in Colorado State University trials. Horticultural oils, which have also been very effective, can cause temporary discoloration of spruce needles.^{2}

== See also ==
- Hemlock woolly adelgid: another disease caused by a woolly adelgid species
- Balsam woolly adelgid: another species of woolly adelgid
