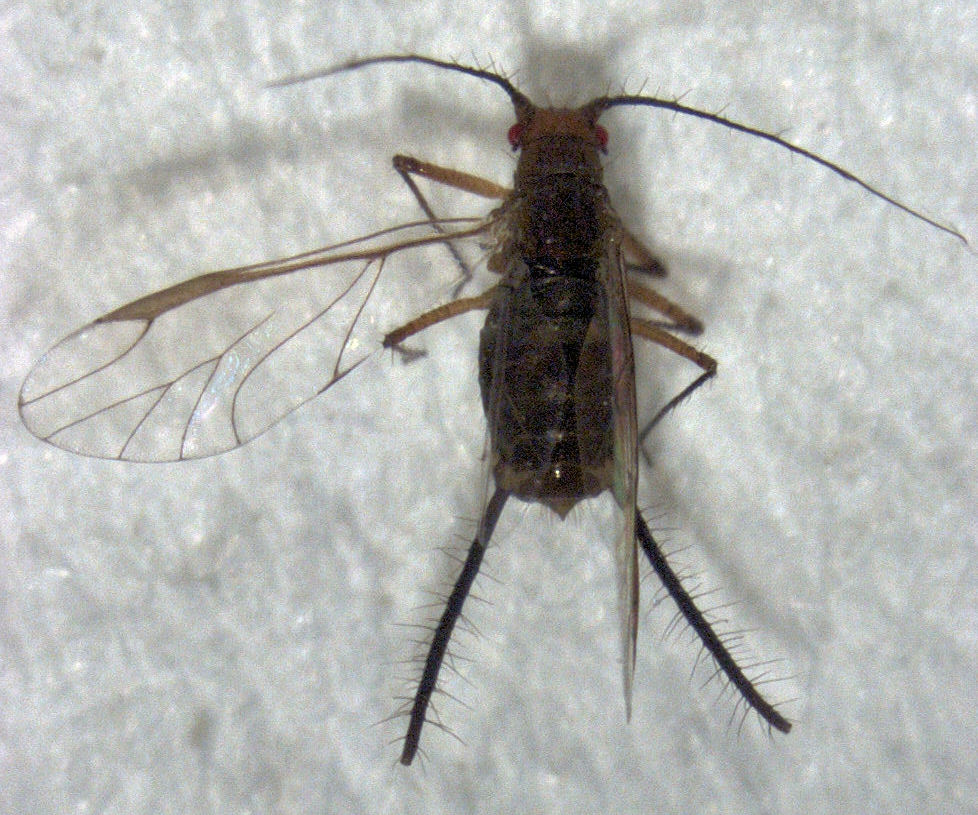
- Greenidea ficicola

Scientific classification
- Domain: Eukaryota
- Kingdom: Animalia
- Phylum: Arthropoda
- Class: Insecta
- Order: Hemiptera
- Suborder: Sternorrhyncha
- Family: Aphididae
- Subfamily: Greenideinae
- Tribe: Greenideini
- Genus: Greenidea; Schouteden, 1905

= Greenidea =

Genus of insects

Greenidea is a genus of aphids belonging to the family Aphididae; they are plant-parasitic insects in the order Hemiptera.

The genus has cosmopolitan distribution.

Species:

- Greenidea aborensis A.K.Ghosh, 1974
- Greenidea anonae (Pergande, 1906)
- Greenidea artocarpi (Westwood, 1890)
- Greenidea ayyari D.N.Raychaudhuri, M.R.Ghosh, M.Banerjee & A.K.
- Greenidea brachyunguis
- Greenidea brideliae Takahashi, 1928
- Greenidea bucktonis A.K.Ghosh, R.C.Basu & D.N.Raychaudhuri, 1970
- Greenidea camelliae
- Greenidea carpini R.Takahashi, 1963
- Greenidea carpinicola P.K.Banerjee & Samiran Chakrabarti, 1991
- Greenidea castanopsidis Noordam, 1994
- Greenidea cayratiae Qiao & Dong Zhang, 2007
- Greenidea chiengmaiensis Robinson, 1972
- Greenidea decaspermi Takahashi, 1933
- Greenidea eugeniae R.Takahashi, 1941
- Greenidea fici R.Takahashi, 1937
- Greenidea ficicola R.Takahashi, 1921
- Greenidea flacourtiae Goot, 1917
- Greenidea fulva Noordam, 1994
- Greenidea gigantea A.K.Ghosh & D.N.Raychaudhuri, 1972
- Greenidea haldari
- Greenidea hangnigra Zhang & Guangxue, 1979
- Greenidea heterotricha
- Greenidea himansui D.N.Raychaudhuri, M.R.Ghosh, M.Banerjee & A.K.
- Greenidea hirsuta R.Takahashi, 1950
- Greenidea hispanica Wegierek & Peñalver, 2002
- Greenidea isensis Sorin & Agarwala, 2002
- Greenidea kheemothicola Lee, Yerim & Seungwhan Lee, 2016
- Greenidea kumaoni
- Greenidea kunmingensis Zhang & Guangxue, 1979
- Greenidea kuwanai (Pergande, 1906)
- Greenidea longicornis M.R.Ghosh, A.K.Ghosh & D.N.Raychaudhuri, 1971
- Greenidea longirostris A.N.Basu, 1970
- Greenidea longisetosa D.N.Raychaudhuri, M.R.Ghosh, M.Banerjee & A.K.
- Greenidea macrostyla
- Greenidea maculata Noordam, 1994
- Greenidea magna Noordam, 1994
- Greenidea mangiferae R.Takahashi, 1925
- Greenidea manii A.K.Ghosh, R.C.Basu & D.N.Raychaudhuri, 1970
- Greenidea morloti
- Greenidea mushana R.Takahashi, 1925
- Greenidea myricae R.Takahashi, 1925
- Greenidea nigra (Maki, 1917)
- Greenidea nigricans Noordam, 1994
- Greenidea nipponica
- Greenidea okajimai
- Greenidea pallescens
- Greenidea pallidipes Noordam, 1994
- Greenidea parthenocissi
- Greenidea photiniphaga D.N.Raychaudhuri, M.R.Ghosh, M.Banerjee & A.K.
- Greenidea prinicola Sugimoto, 2008
- Greenidea prunicola A.K.Ghosh, H.Banerjee & D.N.Raychaudhuri, 1971
- Greenidea psidii Goot, 1917
- Greenidea quercicola R.C.Basu, A.K.Ghosh & D.N.Raychaudhuri, 1973
- Greenidea quercifoliae R.Takahashi, 1921
- Greenidea querciphaga D.N.Raychaudhuri, M.R.Ghosh, M.Banerjee & A.K.
- Greenidea rappardi D.N.Raychaudhuri, 1956
- Greenidea shimae Takahashi, 1929
- Greenidea siamensis
- Greenidea sikkimensis D.N.Raychaudhuri, M.R.Ghosh, M.Banerjee & A.K.
- Greenidea sinensis D.N.Raychaudhuri, 1956
- Greenidea spinotibium D.N.Raychaudhuri & Chatterjee, 1977
- Greenidea sutepensis
- Greenidea symplocosis A.K.Ghosh, R.C.Basu & D.N.Raychaudhuri, 1969
- Greenidea viticola Takahashi, 1929
