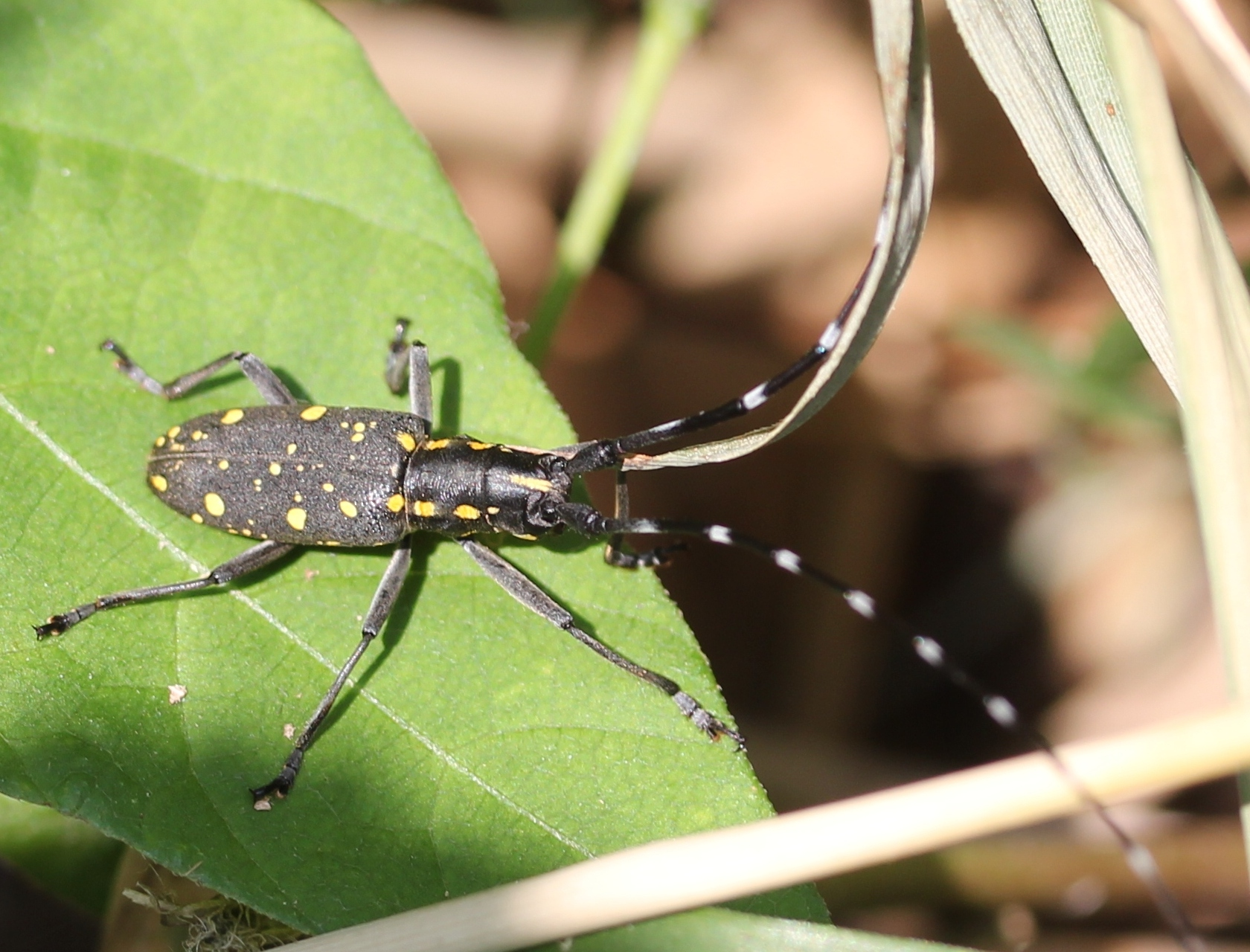

Scientific classification
- Domain: Eukaryota
- Kingdom: Animalia
- Phylum: Arthropoda
- Class: Insecta
- Order: Coleoptera
- Suborder: Polyphaga
- Infraorder: Cucujiformia
- Family: Cerambycidae
- Tribe: Lamiini
- Genus: Psacothea
- Species: P. hilaris

Binomial name
- Psacothea hilaris (Pascoe, 1857)

Synonyms
- Diochares flavoguttatus Fairmaire, 1887; Tibetobia hilaris (Pascoe) Pic, 1931; Monohammus hilaris Pascoe, 1857

= Psacothea hilaris =

Species of beetle

Psacothea hilaris, the yellow spotted longicorn beetle, is a species of beetle in the family Cerambycidae. It was described by Francis Polkinghorne Pascoe in 1857. It is known from North Korea, China and Japan. It has been introduced to Italy.

== Subspecies ==
- Psacothea hilaris botelensis Ohbayashi & Ohbayashi, 1965
- Psacothea hilaris hilaris (Pascoe, 1857)
- Psacothea hilaris insularis Hayashi, 1957
- Psacothea hilaris intermedia Breuning & Ohbayashi, 1966
- Psacothea hilaris iriomotensis Hayashi, 1969
- Psacothea hilaris ishigakiana Ohbayashi & Ohbayashi, 1956
- Psacothea hilaris macronotata Hayashi, 1956
- Psacothea hilaris maculata Breuning, 1954
- Psacothea hilaris miyakejimana Matsushita, 1937
- Psacothea hilaris miyakoana Ohbayashi & Ohbayashi, 1956
- Psacothea hilaris tenebrosa Matsushita, 1933
- Psacothea hilaris yonaguniana Ohbayashi & Ohbayashi, 1956
