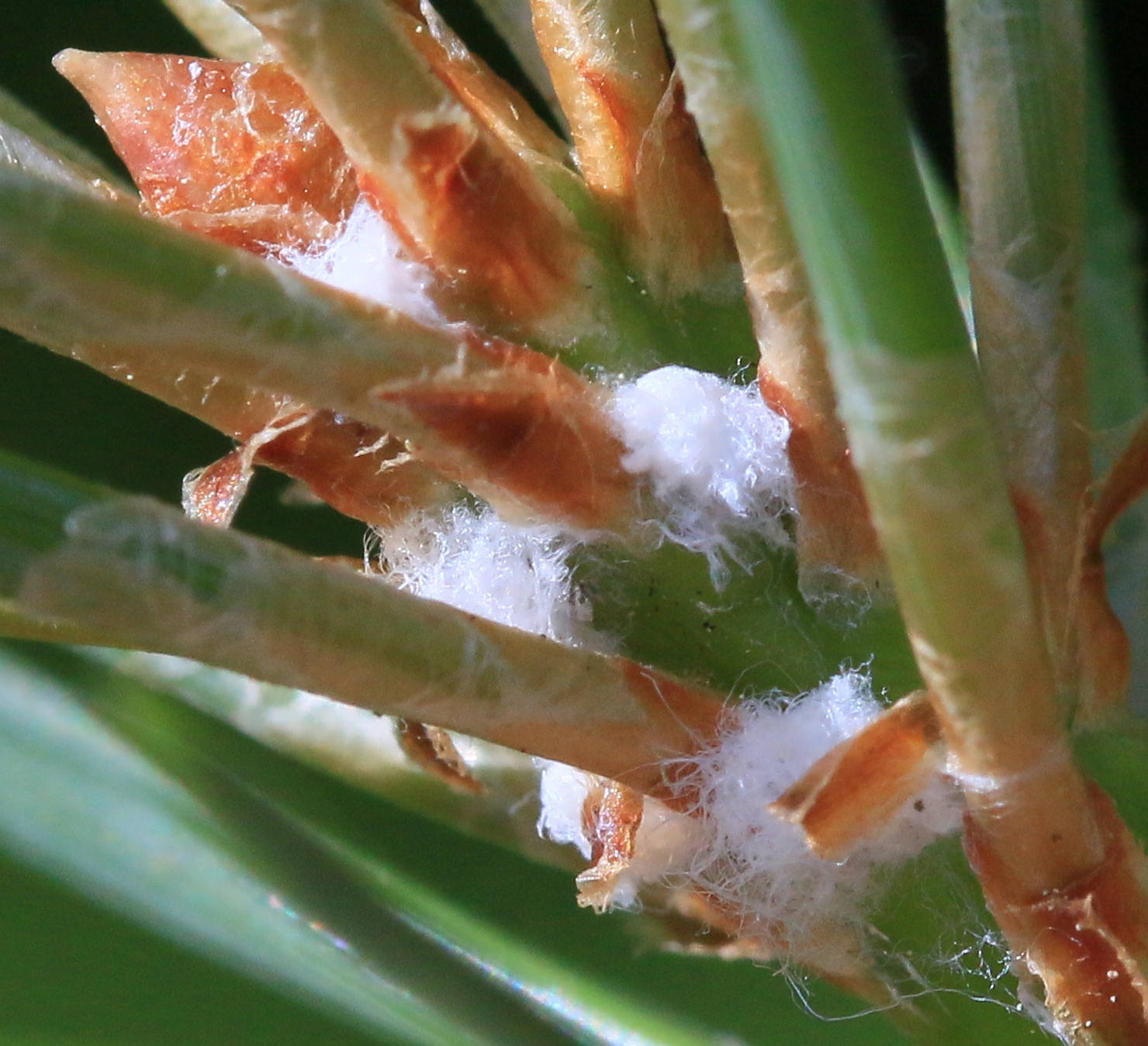
- Pineus pini

Scientific classification
- Domain: Eukaryota
- Kingdom: Animalia
- Phylum: Arthropoda
- Class: Insecta
- Order: Hemiptera
- Suborder: Sternorrhyncha
- Family: Adelgidae
- Genus: Pineus; Shimer, 1869

= Pineus (aphid) =

Genus of true bugs

Pineus is a genus of aphids in the family Adelgidae. There are more than 20 described species in Pineus.

== Species ==
These 29 species belong to the genus Pineus:

- Pineus abietinus Underwood & Balch, 1964
- Pineus armandicola Zhang, Zhong & Zhang, 1992
- Pineus boerneri Annand, 1928
- Pineus boycei Annand, 1928
- Pineus cembrae (Cholodkovsky, 1888)
- Pineus cladogenous Fang & Sun, 1985
- Pineus coloradensis (Gillette, 1907)
- Pineus cortecicolus Fang & Sun, 1985
- Pineus engelmannii Annand, 1928
- Pineus floccus (Patch, 1909)
- Pineus ghanii Yaseen & Ghani, 1971
- Pineus harukawai Inouye, 1945
- Pineus havrylenkoi Blanchard, 1944
- Pineus hosoyai Inouye, 1945
- Pineus konowashiyai Inouye, 1945
- Pineus laevis (Maskell, 1885)
- Pineus matsumurai Inouye, 1945
- Pineus orientalis (Dreyfus, 1888)
- Pineus patchae Börner, 1926
- Pineus pineoides (Cholodkovsky, 1903)
- Pineus pini (Goeze, 1778)
- Pineus pinifoliae (Fitch, 1858)
- Pineus piniyunnanensis Zhang, Zhong & Zhang, 1992
- Pineus sichunanus Zhang, 1980
- Pineus similis (Gillette, 1907) (ragged spruce gall adelgid)
- Pineus simmondsi Yaseen & Ghani, 1971
- Pineus strobi (Hartig, 1839) (pine bark adelgid)
- Pineus sylvestris Annand, 1928
- Pineus wallichianae Yaseen & Ghani, 1971
