= Cervaphis quercus =

Scientific classification
- Kingdom: Animalia
- Phylum: Arthropoda
- Class: Insecta
- Order: Hemiptera
- Suborder: Sternorrhyncha
- Family: Aphididae
- Genus: Cervaphis
- Species: C. quercus

Binomial name
- Cervaphis quercus Takahashi, 1918

Species of true bug

Cervaphis quercus is an aphid species described by Takahashi in 1918.
