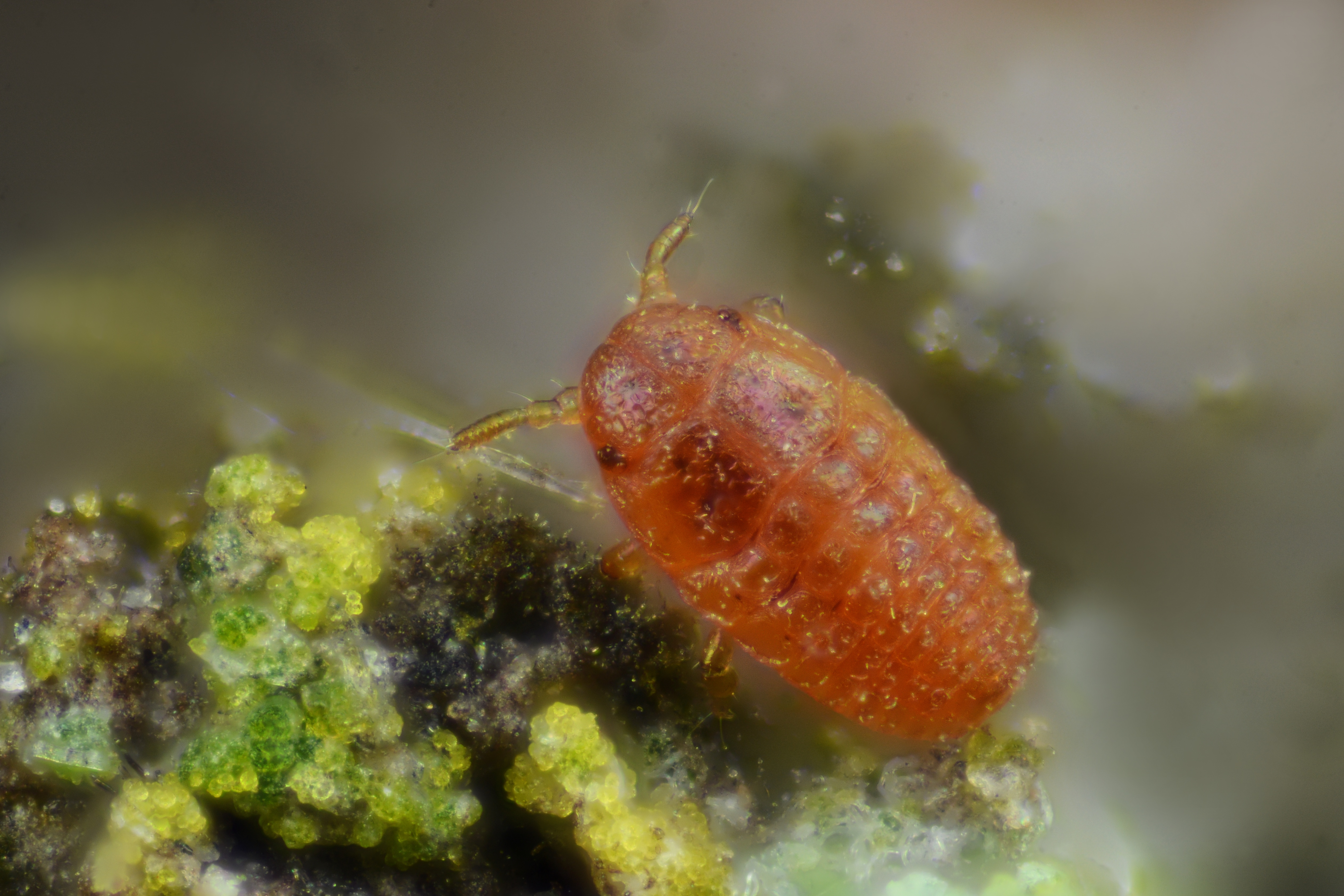

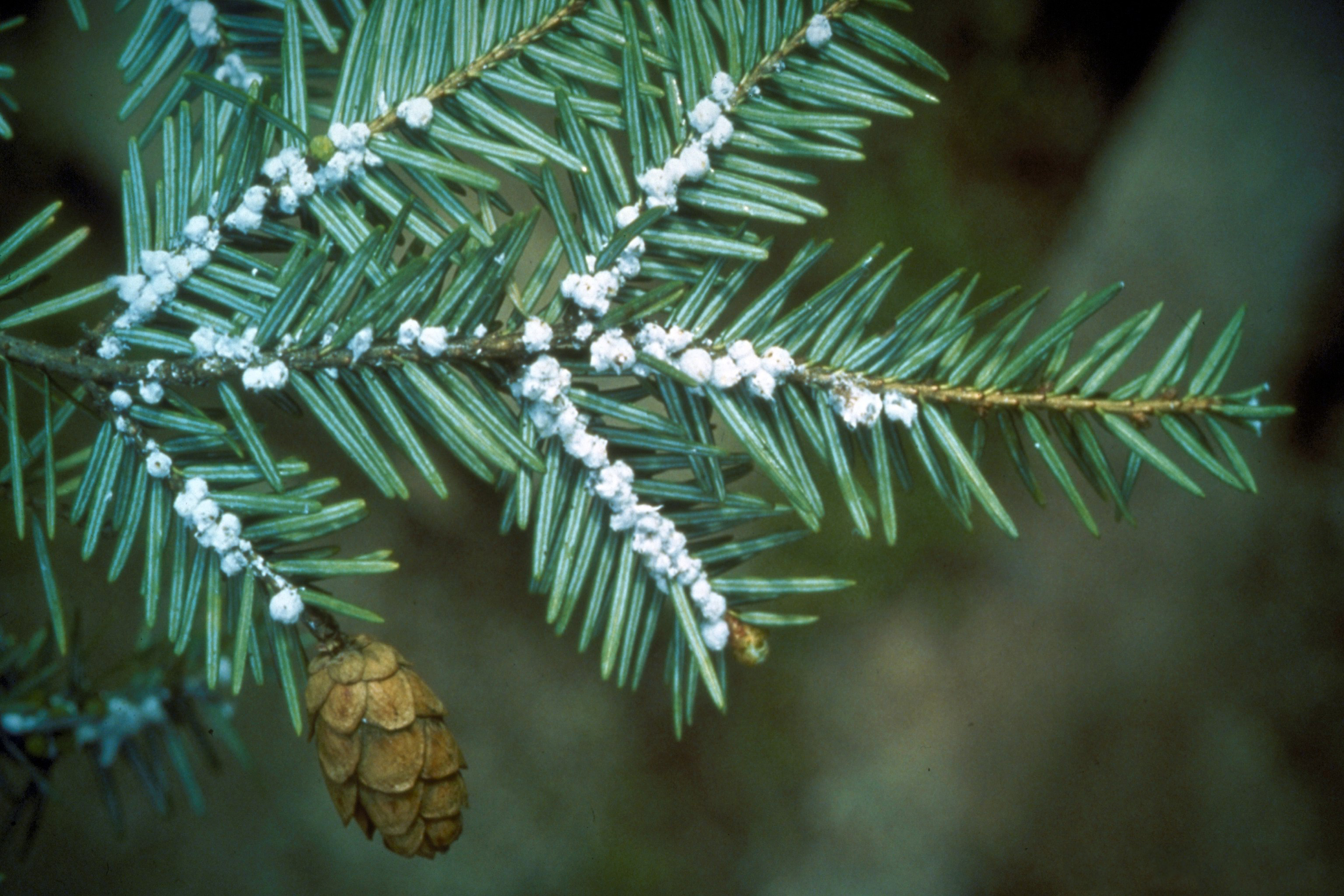
- A. piceae larva (top) and A. tsugae adults (bottom)

Scientific classification
- Kingdom: Animalia
- Phylum: Arthropoda
- Class: Insecta
- Order: Hemiptera
- Suborder: Sternorrhyncha
- Family: Adelgidae
- Genus: Adelges; Vallot, 1836

= Adelges =

Genus of true bugs

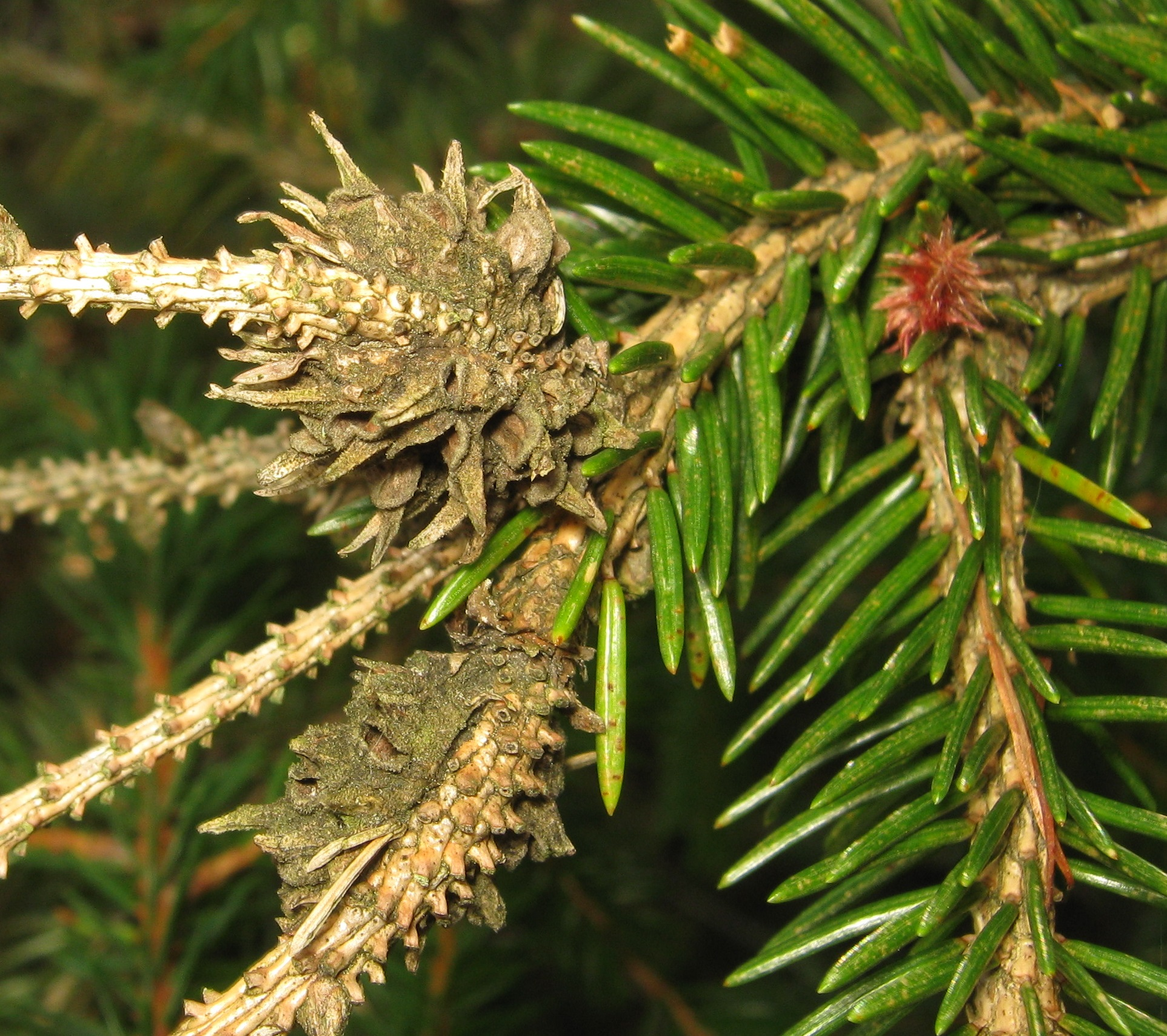
Galls of Adelges abietis

Adelges is a genus of insects which feed on conifers. They have complex life cycles, some species feeding exclusively on spruce, others feeding on spruce and an alternate conifer. However, galls characteristic of each species are formed only on spruce. Six generations are usually needed to complete the 2-year cycle, and in the case of species having an alternate host, winged adults about 2 mm long are formed only in the generations that move from one host to the other.

The spruce gall adelgid (Adelges lariciatus Patch) occurs in alternate years on spruce and larch from Alberta to the Maritimes and in adjacent parts of the United States. The pale spruce gall adelgid (Adelges strobilobius Kaltenbach) has a similar range but prefers black spruce or red spruce to white spruce.

Species include:

- Adelges abietis (Pineapple gall adelgid)
- Adelges cooleyi (Gall adelgid)
- Adelges piceae (Balsam woolly adelgid)
- Adelges tsugae (Hemlock woolly adelgid)
- Adelges viridanus
