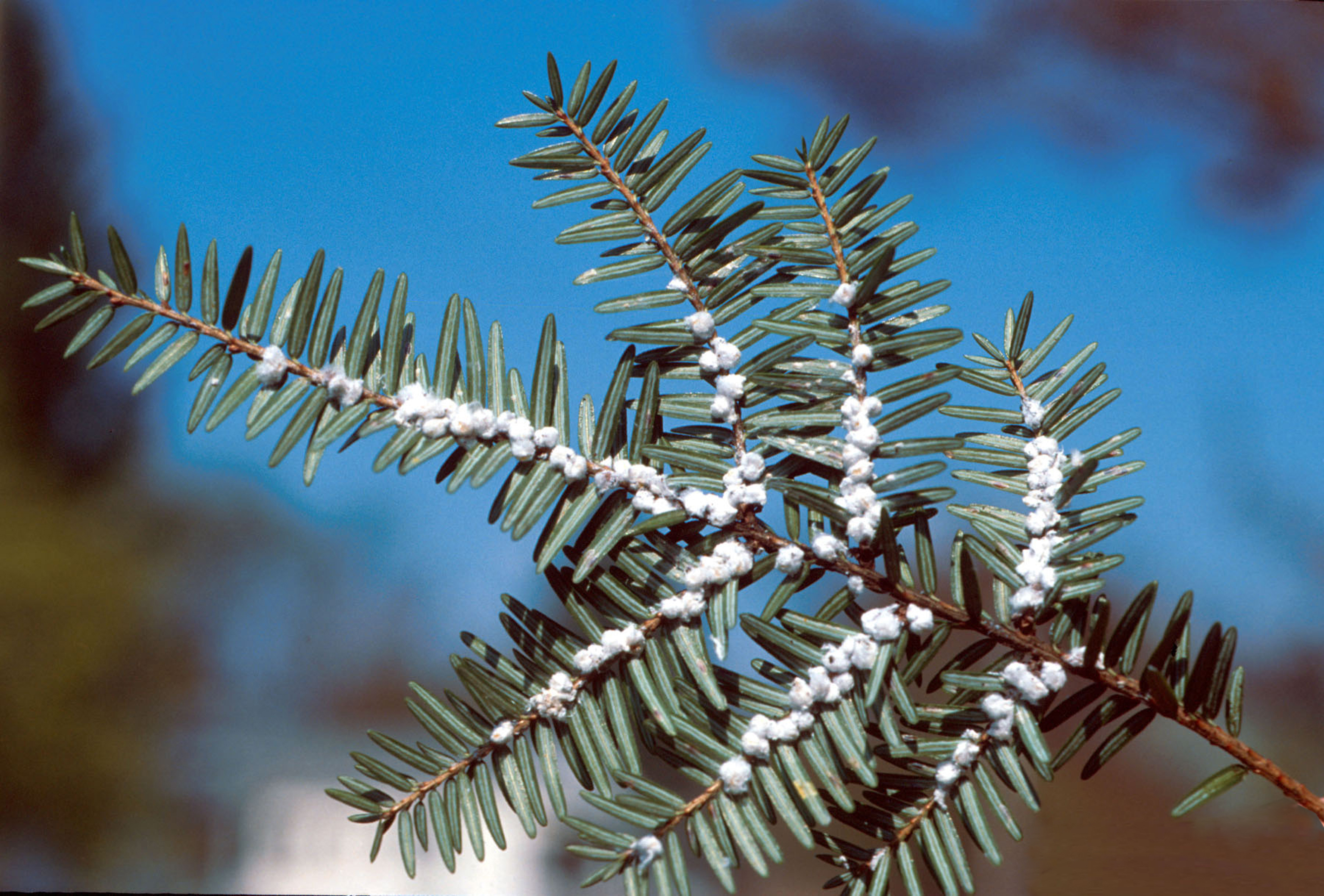
- Hemlock woolly adelgid

Scientific classification
- Domain: Eukaryota
- Kingdom: Animalia
- Phylum: Arthropoda
- Class: Insecta
- Order: Hemiptera
- Suborder: Sternorrhyncha
- Infraorder: Aphidomorpha
- Superfamily: Phylloxeroidea
- Family: Adelgidae; Schouteden, 1909

Genera
- See text

= Adelgidae =

Adelgidae Temporal range: Eocene–Present

Family of true bugs

The Adelgidae are a small family of the Hemiptera closely related to the aphids, and often included in the Aphidoidea with the Phylloxeridae or placed within the superfamily Phylloxeroidea as a sister of the Aphidoidea within the infraorder Aphidomorpha. The family is composed of species associated with pine, spruce, or other conifers, known respectively as "pine aphids" or "spruce aphids". This family includes the former family Chermesidae, or "Chermidae", the name of which was declared invalid by the ICZN in 1955. There is still considerable debate as to the number of genera within the family, and the classification is still unstable and inconsistent among competing authors.

There are about fifty species of adelgids known. All of them are native to the northern hemisphere, although some have been introduced to the southern hemisphere as invasive species. Unlike aphids, the adelgids have no tail-like cauda and no cornicles.

Adelgids only lay eggs, and never give birth to live nymphs as aphids do. Adelgids are covered with dense woolly wax. A complete adelgid life cycle lasts two years. Adelgid nymphs are known as sistentes, and the overwintering sistentes are called neosistens.

Rain can kill adelgids by dislodging eggs and sistentes from trees.

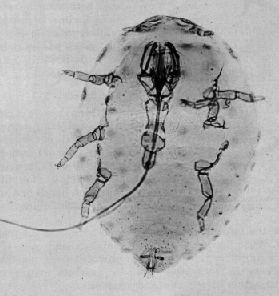
Balsam woolly adelgid

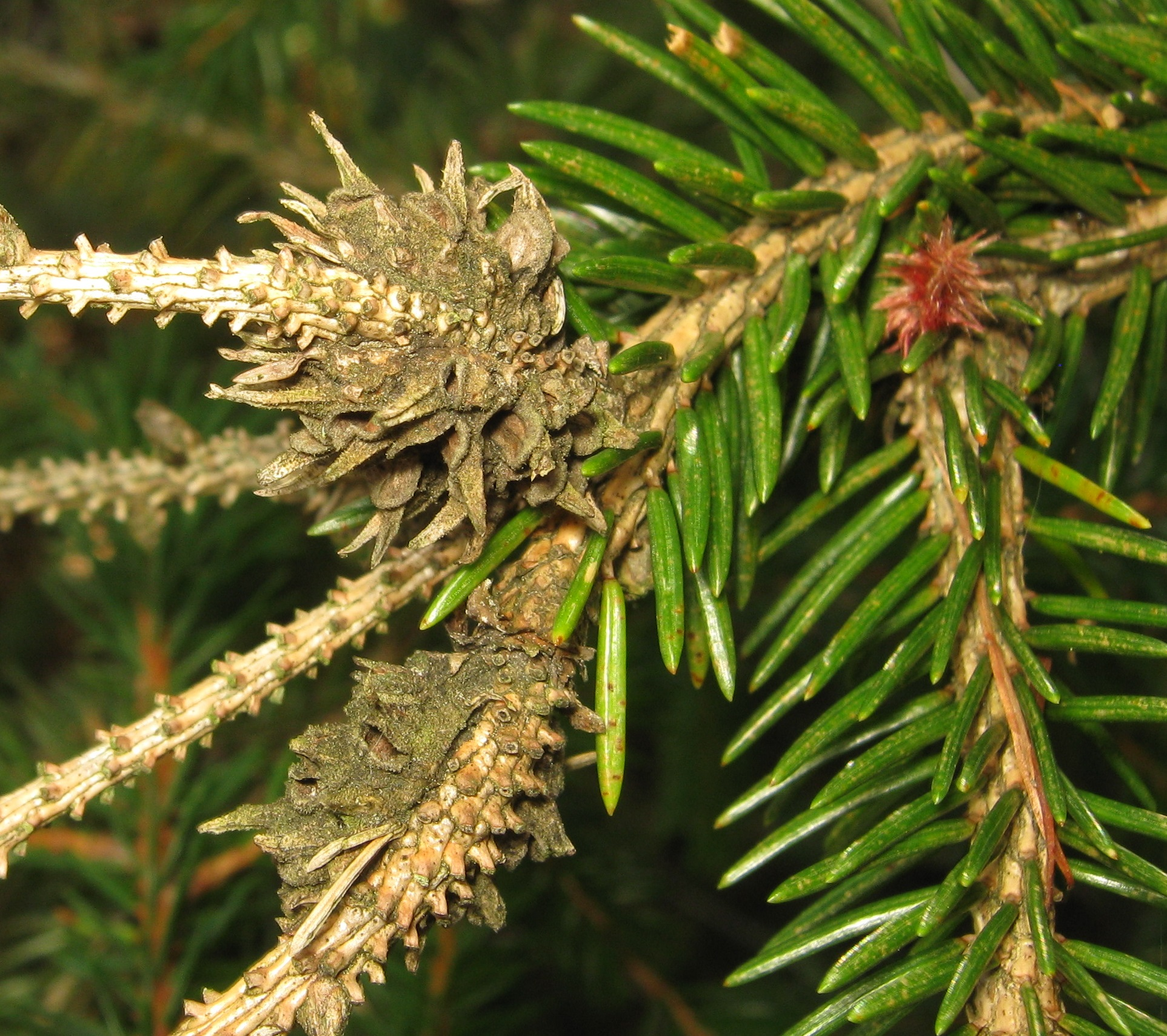
Galls of Adelges abietis (Pineapple gall adelgid) on fir (Abies)

== Genera ==
- Adelges Vallot, 1836
- Aphrastasia Börner, 1909
- Cholodkovskya Börner, 1909
- Dreyfusia Börner, 1908
- Eopineus Steffan, 1968
- Gilletteella Börner, 1930
- Pineus Shimer, 1869
- Sacchiphantes Curtis, 1844

== See also ==
- Balsam woolly adelgid
- Gall adelgid
- Hemlock woolly adelgid
- Pineapple gall adelgid
