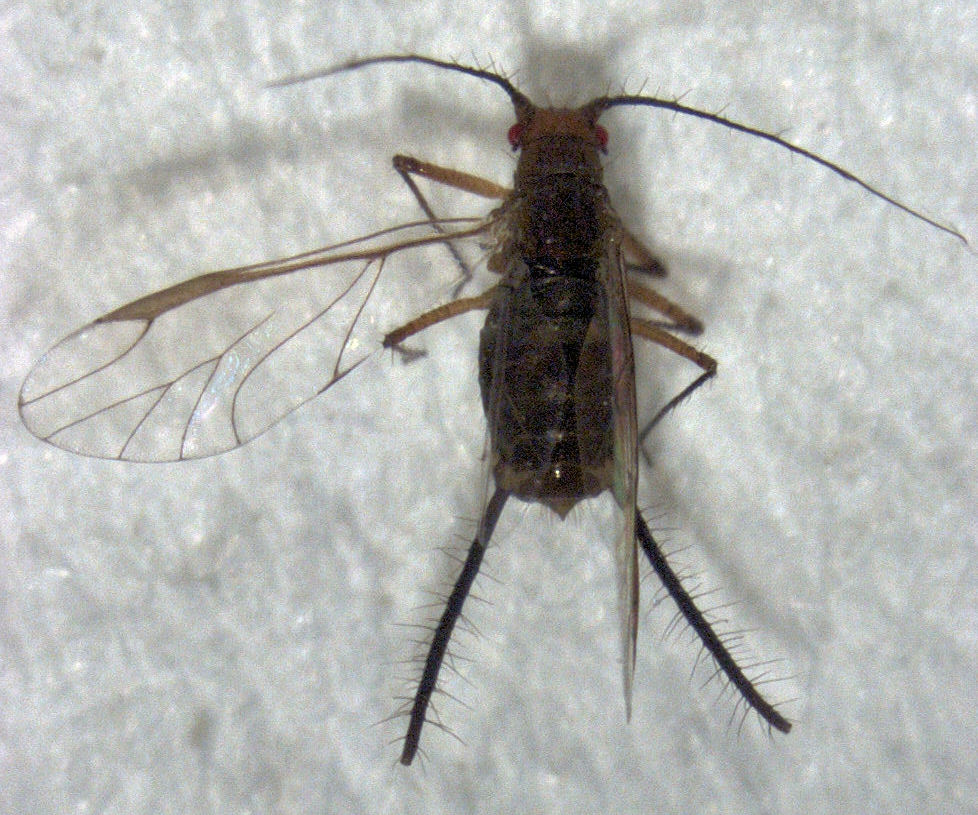

Scientific classification
- Domain: Eukaryota
- Kingdom: Animalia
- Phylum: Arthropoda
- Class: Insecta
- Order: Hemiptera
- Suborder: Sternorrhyncha
- Family: Aphididae
- Genus: Greenidea
- Species: G. ficicola

Binomial name
- Greenidea ficicola Takahashi, 1921

= Greenidea ficicola =

Species of true bug

Greenidea ficicola is a species of aphid. It was described by Takahashi in 1921. Its color is yellowish-brown to green to dark brown, and it usually has a body length of 1.7-2.2 mm. It has long, hairy siphunculi (at least one-third of body length) dark brown curved outwards distally.
