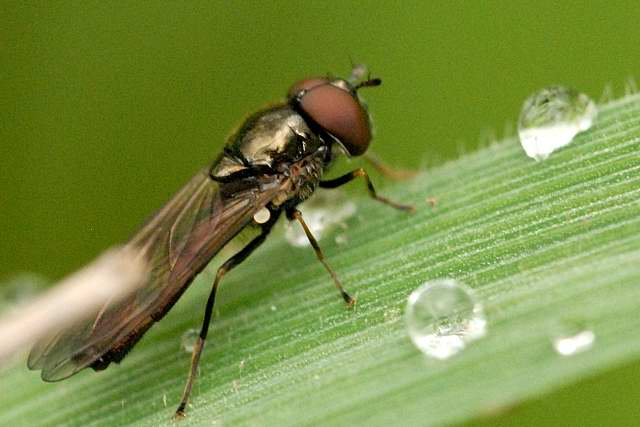
- Heringia brevidens

Scientific classification
- Kingdom: Animalia
- Phylum: Arthropoda
- Clade: Pancrustacea
- Class: Insecta
- Order: Diptera
- Section: Aschiza
- Superfamily: Syrphoidea
- Family: Syrphidae
- Subfamily: Pipizinae
- Genus: Heringia; Rondani, 1856

Type species
- Pipiza heringi Zetterstedt, 1843

Synonyms
- Cnemodon Egger, 1865 (Preocc.); Neocnemodon Goffe, 1944

= Heringia =

Genus of flies

Heringia or the Smoothleg fly is a genus of hoverflies, from the family Syrphidae, in the order Diptera. The species are distributed in North America and Europe Larvae are predatory upon Schizoneura aphids on Ulmus and Pemphigus aphids on Populus, Dreyjusia piceae on Abies and Eriosoma lanigerum on Malus.

== Description ==
For terminology see Speight key to genera and glossary
Another genus of LBFs (little black flies) Females can not be identified to species

The eyes and face of this genus are densely pilose. The straight face and evenly rounded oral margin are also noticeable, with the frontal prominence very short. The face is black, with the front slightly swollen, and the antennae are short in males and long in females. The thorax is heavily pilose, with a ventral scutellar fringe present, and the anterior anepisternum is bare, (pilose in Trichopsomyia). The fourth sternite of the male is as long as its tergite. Vein R_{4+5} is straight or nearly so, not strongly dipped or with a spur into cell r_{4+5}. The fore and mid femora have no distinct spines or spurs, the hind trochanter has no ventral spur, and the mesocoxa is without a spur.

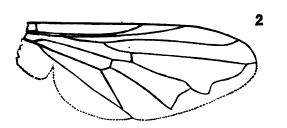
wing

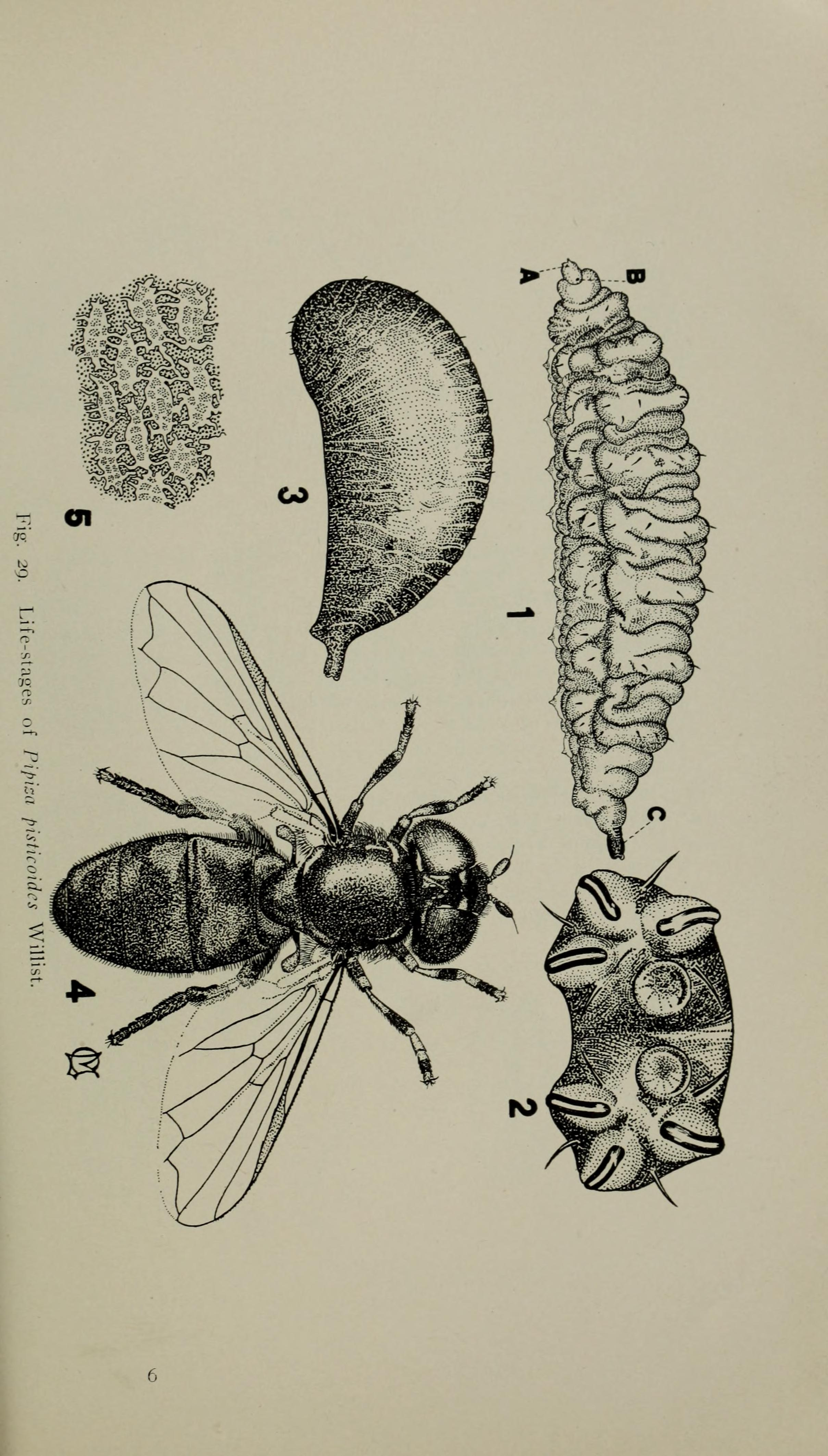
H pisticacodes adult, larvae and puparium

== Species ==
- H. adpropinquans (Becker, 1908)
- H. albipleura (Curran, 1921)
- H. auripleura (Curran, 1921)
- H. brevidens (Egger, 1865)
- H. calcarata Loew, 1866
- H. californica (Davidson, 1917)
- H. canadensis Curran, 1921
- H. carinata (Curran, 1921)
- H. cevelata (Curran, 1921)
- H. comutata Curran, 1921
- H. corvallis (Curran, 1921)
- H. coxalis (Curran, 1921)
- H. elongata (Curran, 1921)
- H. fulvimanus (Zetterstedt, 1843)
- H. heringi (Zetterstedt, 1843)
- H. hispanica (Strobl, 1909)
- H. intensica Curran, 1921
- H. intermedia (Curran, 1921)
- H. larusi Vujic, 1999
- H. latitarsis (Egger, 1865)
- H. longiseta (Curran, 1921)
- H. lovetti (Curran, 1921)
- H. myerma (Curran, 1921)
- H. nigricornis (Curran, 1922)
- H. nudifrons (Curran, 1921)
- H. ontarioensis (Curran, 1921)
- H. pisticoides (Williston, 1887)
- H. placida (Curran, 1921)
- H. pubescens (Delucchi & Pschorn-Walcher, 1955)
- H. rita (Curran, 1921)
- H. salax (Loew, 1866)
- H. senilis Sack, 1938
- H. sinuosa (Curran, 1921)
- H. squamulae (Curran, 1921)
- H. trochanterata (Malloch, 1918)
- H. unicolor (Curran, 1921)
- H. venteris (Curran, 1921)
- H. verrucula (Collin, 1931)
- H. vitripennis (Meigen, 1822)
