= Heringia elongata =

Scientific classification
- Kingdom: Animalia
- Phylum: Arthropoda
- Class: Insecta
- Order: Diptera
- Family: Syrphidae
- Subfamily: Pipizinae
- Genus: Heringia
- Species: H. elongata

Binomial name
- Heringia elongata Curran 1921

Synonyms
- Cnemodon elongata Curran, 1921

Species of fly

Heringia elongata (Curran 1921), the elongate spikeleg, is an uncommon species of syrphid fly observed in mainly eastern North America but scattered across the US Canadian border to the Pacific Coast. Hoverflies can remain nearly motionless in flight. The adults are also known as flower flies for they are commonly found on flowers, from which they get both energy-giving nectar and protein-rich pollen. Larvae are predators of Eriosoma lanigerum.
