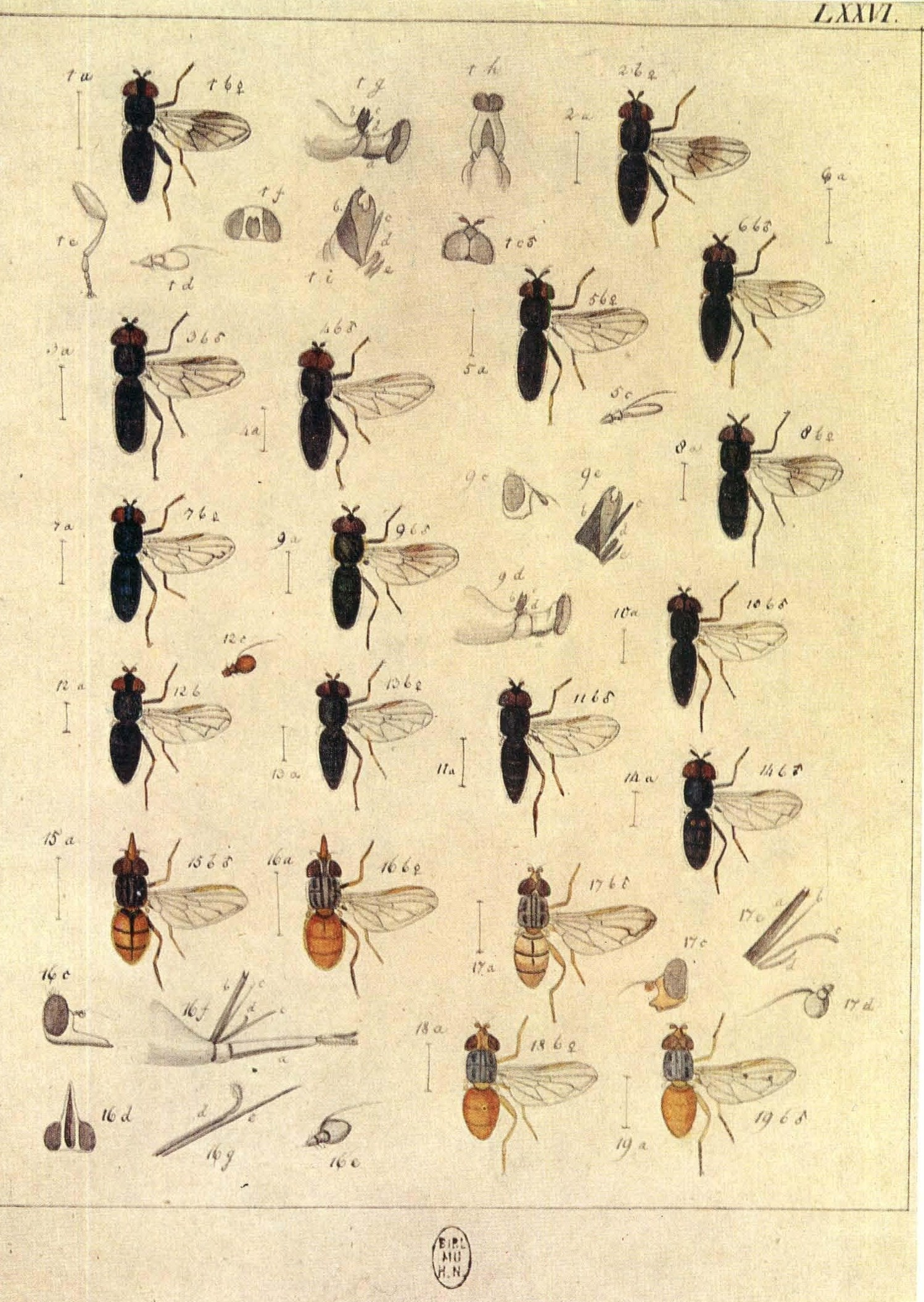
- Heringia vitripennis in Meigen Europäischen Zweiflügeligen (figure 11)

Scientific classification
- Kingdom: Animalia
- Phylum: Arthropoda
- Class: Insecta
- Order: Diptera
- Superfamily: Syrphoidea
- Family: Syrphidae
- Subfamily: Pipizinae
- Genus: Heringia
- Species: H. vitripennis

Binomial name
- Heringia vitripennis (Meigen, 1822)

= Heringia vitripennis =

Species of fly

Heringia vitripennis is a Palearctic species of hoverfly.

== Description ==
External images For terms see Morphology of Diptera
Lateral dust spots on frons conspicuous. 3rd antennomere (basoflagellomere) elongate, 2–3 times as long as broad. Male coxa 2 and trochanter 3 without spurs. Abdomen tergites black. Abdomen elongated. Metatarsae 1 with a shiny, pale pit; metatarsae 2 without keel. Thorax dorsum with long white hairs. Face mostly black-haired. The male genitalia are figured by Delucchi and Pschorn-Walcher (1955). Delucchi et al. (1957) figure the larva. See references for determination

== Biology ==
A woodland species (conifer forest and plantation, deciduous forest (Quercus, Carpinus, Ulmus), suburban parks and gardens. Arboreal but visits flowers of white umbellifers, Euphorbia, Potentilla, Prunus serotina, Rosa, Rubus fruticosus and Salix. The larvae are predacious on adelgid aphids. The flight period is May to September.

== Distribution ==
Palearctic Southern Sweden to central France. Ireland eastwards through North Europe and Central Europe into Russia and on to the Russian Far East and Siberia to the Pacific coast.
