= P. carbonaria =

P. carbonaria may refer to:

- Percina carbonaria, the Texas logperch, a small bony fish species
- Pipiza carbonaria, a hoverfly species in the genus Pipiza
- Psilocybe carbonaria, a mushroom species

== See also ==
- Carbonaria (disambiguation)
