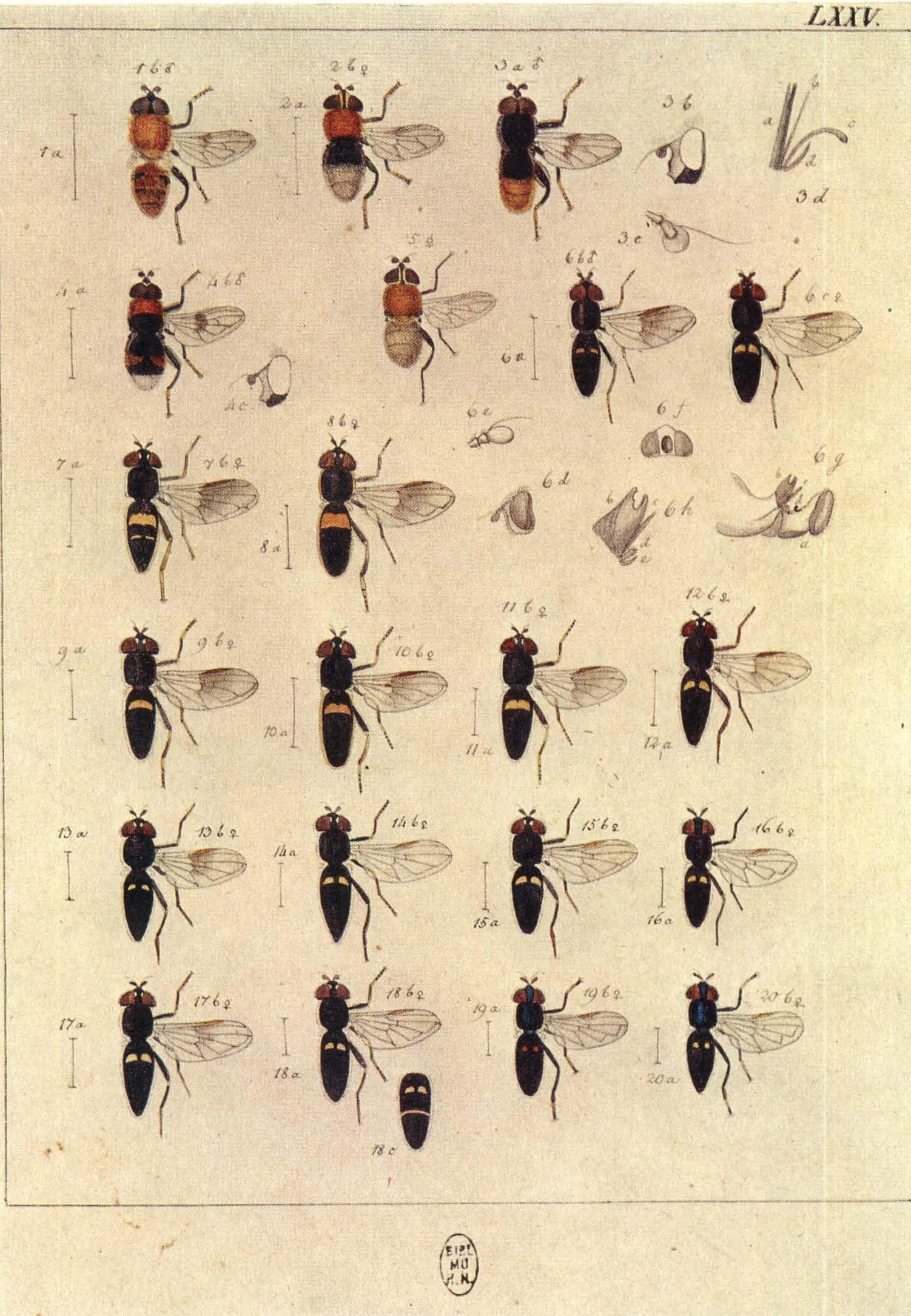
- Pipiza noctiluca in Europäischen Zweiflügeligen (figure 6)

Scientific classification
- Kingdom: Animalia
- Phylum: Arthropoda
- Class: Insecta
- Order: Diptera
- Superfamily: Syrphoidea
- Family: Syrphidae
- Subfamily: Pipizinae
- Genus: Pipiza
- Species: P. noctiluca

Binomial name
- Pipiza noctiluca (Linnaeus, 1758)

Synonyms
- Musca noctiluca Linnaeus, 1758; Musca tristor Harris, 1780; Pipiza tristor (Harris, 1780); Pipiza vana Zetterstedt, 1843

= Pipiza noctiluca =

Species of fly

Pipiza noctiluca is a species of Hoverfly, from the family Syrphidae, in the order Diptera.

== Description ==
External images For terms see Morphology of Diptera
Wing length 6.5 -8mm. Tarsae1: segments 1-2 yellowish; face broadened towards mouth edge with eye margins divergent. Wing: dark cloud at median.3rd segment as long as wide. Abdomen yellow spots with small or abdomen entirely grey black. See references for determination.

== Distribution ==
Palearctic Atlantic zone of Europe and Scandinavia. All Europe if older records are accepted

== Biology ==
Habitat: Salix stands and Quercus woodland, Atlantic scrub, conifer forest, conifer plantations. Suburban gardens and along hedges in farmland. Flowers visited include umbellifers, Crataegus, Filipendula, Ranunculus, Rosa, Stellaria, Taraxacum. Flies May to September. Pipiza larvae are predators of gall forming aphids.
