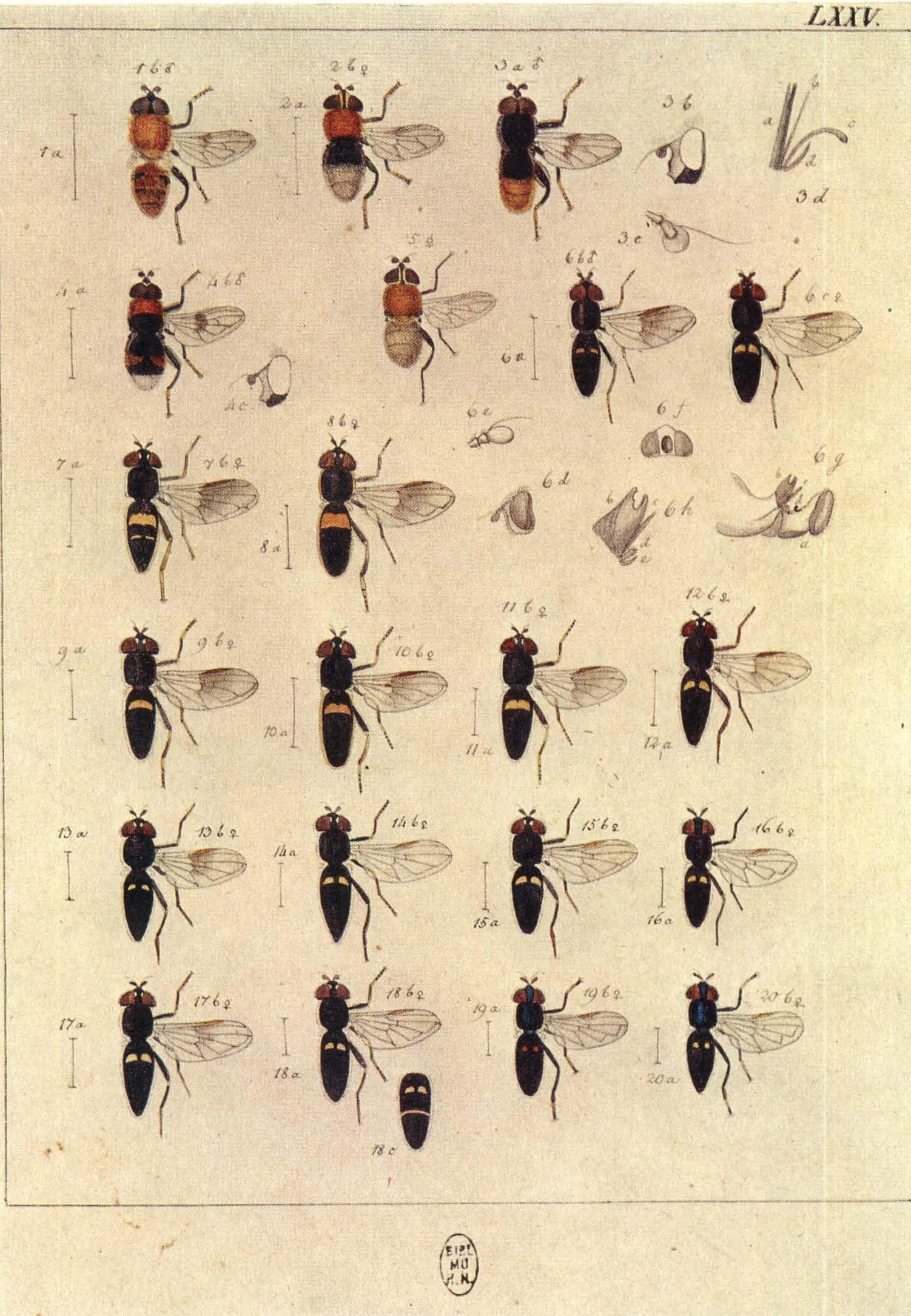
- Pipiza bimaculata in Europäischen Zweiflügeligen (figure 14)

Scientific classification
- Kingdom: Animalia
- Phylum: Arthropoda
- Clade: Pancrustacea
- Class: Insecta
- Order: Diptera
- Superfamily: Syrphoidea
- Family: Syrphidae
- Subfamily: Pipizinae
- Genus: Pipiza
- Species: P. bimaculata

Binomial name
- Pipiza bimaculata Meigen, 1822

Synonyms
- Pipiza chalybeata Meigen, 1822; Pipiza geniculata Meigen, 1822; Pipiza guttata Meigen, 1822

= Pipiza bimaculata =

Species of fly

Pipiza bimaculata is a species of hoverfly, family Syrphidae, in the order Diptera.

== Description ==
External images For terms see Morphology of Diptera
Wing length 4·5–6 ·5 mm. Abdomen large yellow spots. Tarsae 1 all segments black. Face not broadened towards mouth edge with eye margins parallel. Wing diffusely infuscated or hyaline. 3rd segment of antenna longer than wide. See references for determination.

== Distribution ==
Palearctic Atlantic Europe. Most of Europe if older determinations are correct.

== Biology ==
Habitat: Quercus woodland. Flowers visited include Ranunculus. Flies May to June .
