= Pipiza fenestrata =

Scientific classification
- Kingdom: Animalia
- Phylum: Arthropoda
- Class: Insecta
- Order: Diptera
- Superfamily: Syrphoidea
- Family: Syrphidae
- Subfamily: Pipizinae
- Genus: Pipiza
- Species: P. fenestrata

Binomial name
- Pipiza fenestrata Meigen, 1822

Species of fly

Pipiza fenestrata is a species of hoverfly, from the family Syrphidae, in the order Diptera. They are found in Central Europe and live in deciduous forests. This species of Pipiza tends to live deeper in the forest than others in this genus. Males of this species possess holoptic vision, while females have dichoptic vision.
