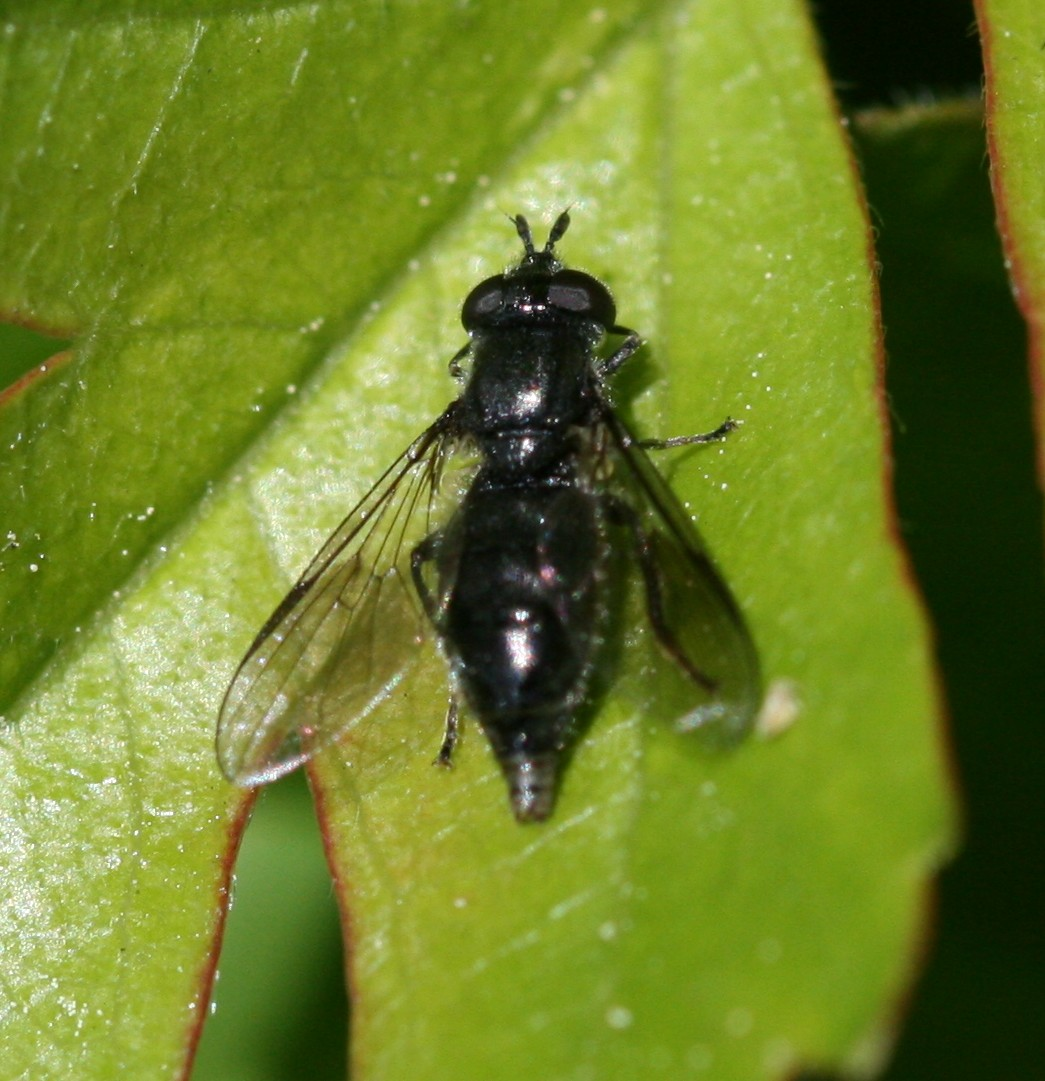
- Pipiza austriaca female

Scientific classification
- Kingdom: Animalia
- Phylum: Arthropoda
- Class: Insecta
- Order: Diptera
- Superfamily: Syrphoidea
- Family: Syrphidae
- Subfamily: Pipizinae
- Genus: Pipiza
- Species: P. austriaca

Binomial name
- Pipiza austriaca Meigen, 1822

= Pipiza austriaca =

Species of fly

Pipiza austriaca is a species of hoverfly, from the family Syrphidae, in the order Diptera.

== Description ==
External images For terms see Morphology of Diptera
Wing length 6–8 mm. Hind femora strongly thickened, with a large ventral ridge. Wing with darkened cloud. Thorax and abdomen pale-haired. The larva is described and figured by Goeldlin (1974) See references for determination.

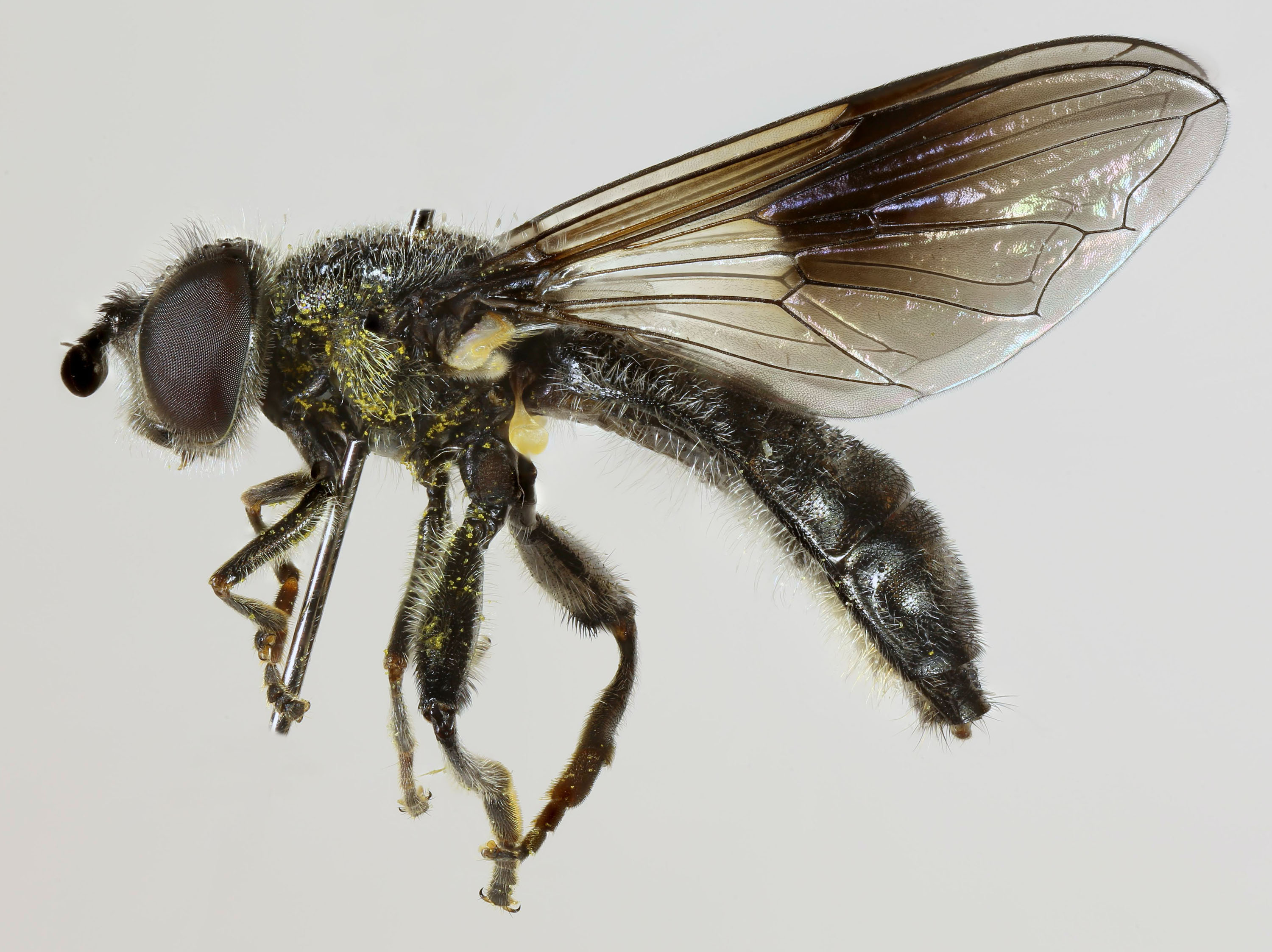

== Distribution ==
Palearctic Atlantic Europe. All Europe if older determinations are correct.

== Biology ==
Habitat:Quercus woodland clearings thickets of Rubus fruticosus along hedges, field-margins with a tall herb layer Atlantic scrub (Corylus) along hedges, field-margins with tall herb vegetation. Flowers visited include umbellifers, Euphorbia, Ranunculus. Flies mid-June to end August. Pipiza larvae are predators of gall forming aphids.
