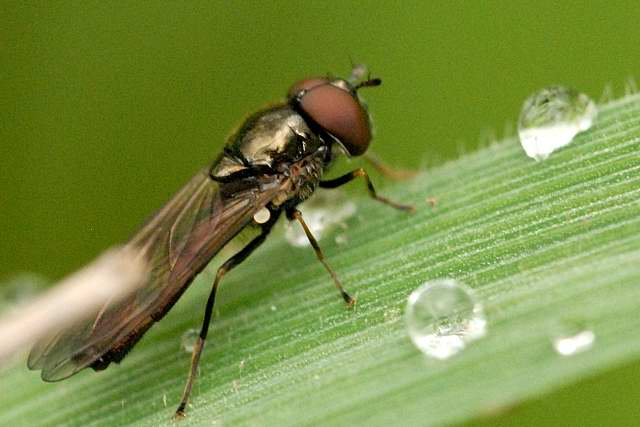
- Heringia brevidens

Scientific classification
- Kingdom: Animalia
- Phylum: Arthropoda
- Class: Insecta
- Order: Diptera
- Superfamily: Syrphoidea
- Family: Syrphidae
- Subfamily: Pipizinae
- Genus: Heringia
- Species: H. brevidens

Binomial name
- Heringia brevidens (Egger, 1865)

= Heringia brevidens =

Species of fly

Heringia brevidens is a species of hoverfly, from the family Syrphidae, in the order Diptera.
