= Heringia verrucula =

Scientific classification
- Kingdom: Animalia
- Phylum: Arthropoda
- Class: Insecta
- Order: Diptera
- Superfamily: Syrphoidea
- Family: Syrphidae
- Subfamily: Pipizinae
- Genus: Heringia
- Species: H. verrucula

Binomial name
- Heringia verrucula (Collin, 1931)

Species of fly

Heringia verrucula is a European species of hoverfly.
