= Heringia rita =

Scientific classification
- Kingdom: Animalia
- Phylum: Arthropoda
- Class: Insecta
- Order: Diptera
- Family: Syrphidae
- Subfamily: Pipizinae
- Genus: Heringia
- Species: H. rita

Binomial name
- Heringia rita Curran 1921

Species of fly

Heringia rita (Curran 1921), the black-faced spikeleg, is a common species of syrphid fly observed in many locations across North America. Hoverflies can remain nearly motionless in flight. The adults are also known as flower flies for they are commonly found on flowers, from which they get both energy-giving nectar and protein-rich pollen. Larvae have been reared from Adelges piceae and Eriosoma lanigerium.
