= Pipiza femoralis =

Scientific classification
- Kingdom: Animalia
- Phylum: Arthropoda
- Class: Insecta
- Order: Diptera
- Superfamily: Syrphoidea
- Family: Syrphidae
- Subfamily: Pipizinae
- Genus: Pipiza
- Species: P. femoralis

Binomial name
- Pipiza femoralis Loew, 1866

Synonyms
- Pipiza albipilosa Williston, 1887; Syrphus binotatus Harris, 1925

Species of fly

Pipiza femoralis is a species of syrphid fly in the family Syrphidae.
