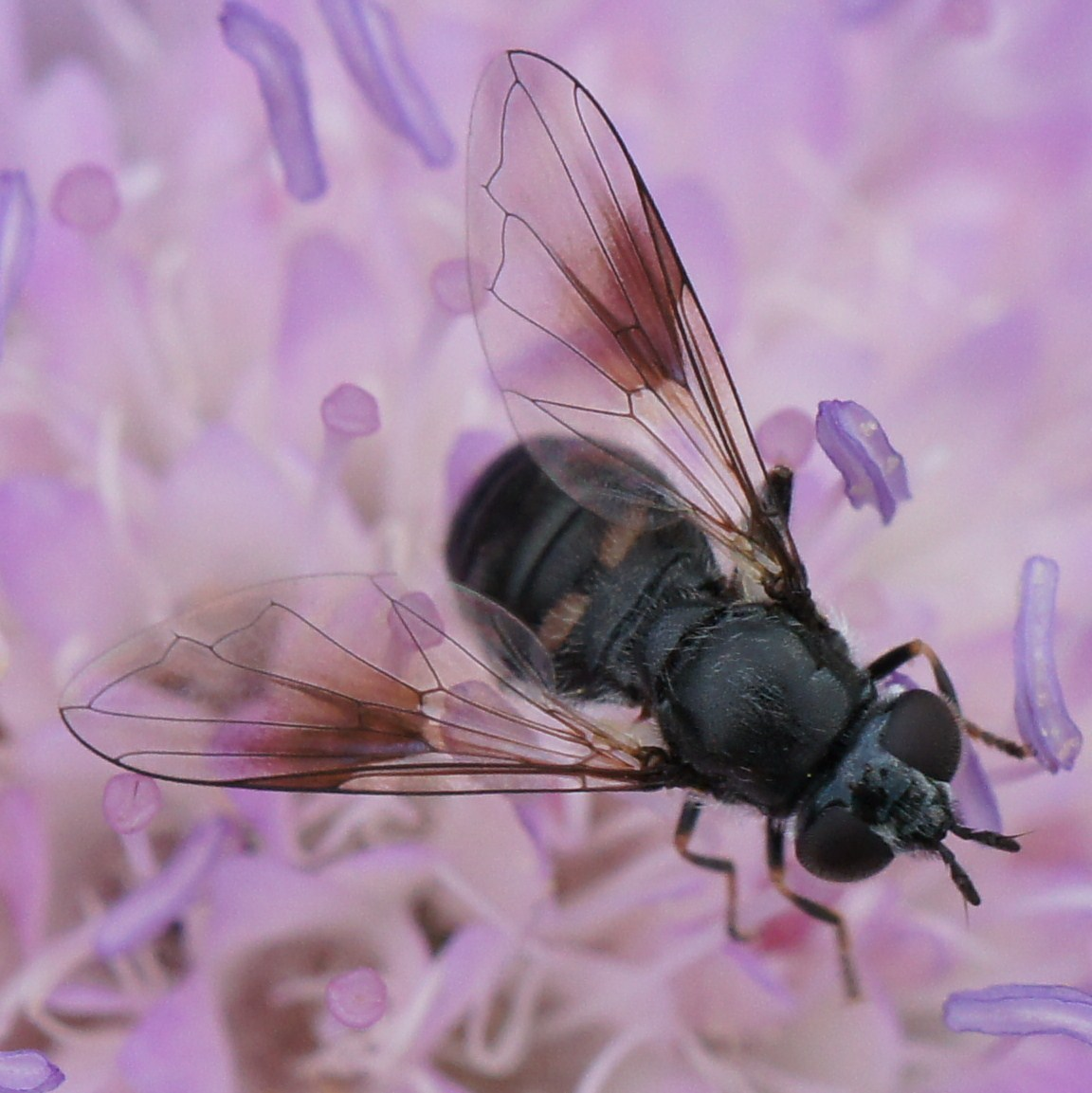

Scientific classification
- Kingdom: Animalia
- Phylum: Arthropoda
- Class: Insecta
- Order: Diptera
- Superfamily: Syrphoidea
- Family: Syrphidae
- Subfamily: Pipizinae
- Genus: Pipiza
- Species: P. lugubris

Binomial name
- Pipiza lugubris (Fabricius, 1775)

Synonyms
- Musca dirae Harris, 1780; Pipiza dirae (Harris, 1780); Pipiza funebris Meigen, 1822; Syrphus lugubris Fabricius, 1775

= Pipiza lugubris =

Species of fly

Pipiza lugubris is a species of hoverfly, from the family Syrphidae, in the order Diptera.
