= Heringia latitarsis =

Scientific classification
- Kingdom: Animalia
- Phylum: Arthropoda
- Class: Insecta
- Order: Diptera
- Superfamily: Syrphoidea
- Family: Syrphidae
- Subfamily: Pipizinae
- Genus: Heringia
- Species: H. latitarsis

Binomial name
- Heringia latitarsis (Egger, 1865)

Species of fly

Heringia latitarsis is a European species of hoverfly.
