= Heringia heringi =

Scientific classification
- Kingdom: Animalia
- Phylum: Arthropoda
- Clade: Pancrustacea
- Class: Insecta
- Order: Diptera
- Superfamily: Syrphoidea
- Family: Syrphidae
- Subfamily: Pipizinae
- Genus: Heringia
- Species: H. heringi

Binomial name
- Heringia heringi (Zetterstedt, 1843)

Species of fly

Heringia heringi is a European species of hoverfly.

== Description ==
External images For terms see Morphology of Diptera

The wing length is 4-25-6-25 mm. Lateral dust spots on frons conspicuous.3rd antennomere (basoflagellomere) elongate, 2-3 times as long as broad. Male coxa 2 and trochanter 3 without spurs. Abdomen tergites black. Abdomen elongated. Claussen et al (1994) figure the male terminalia. Larva: described and figured by Dusek and Laska (1959). See references for determination.

== Biology ==
A woodland species (Fagus, Quercus), including alluvial hardwood forest, and broad-leaved evergreen forest (Quercus ilex and Quercus suber), orchards and sometimes suburban gardens. Flowers visited include Alliaria, Allium ursinum, Anthriscus, Caltha, Hypericum, Prunus spinosa. The flight period is April to July. The larvae feed on the gall-forming aphid Schizoneura lanuginosa Gillette, 1908 on Ulmus.Has also been reared from an aphid galls on Populus and Salix.

== Distribution ==
Palearctic South Norway to South Spain and the Mediterranean basin. Ireland East through Europe and European Russia to Turkey, Greece. Mongolia.
