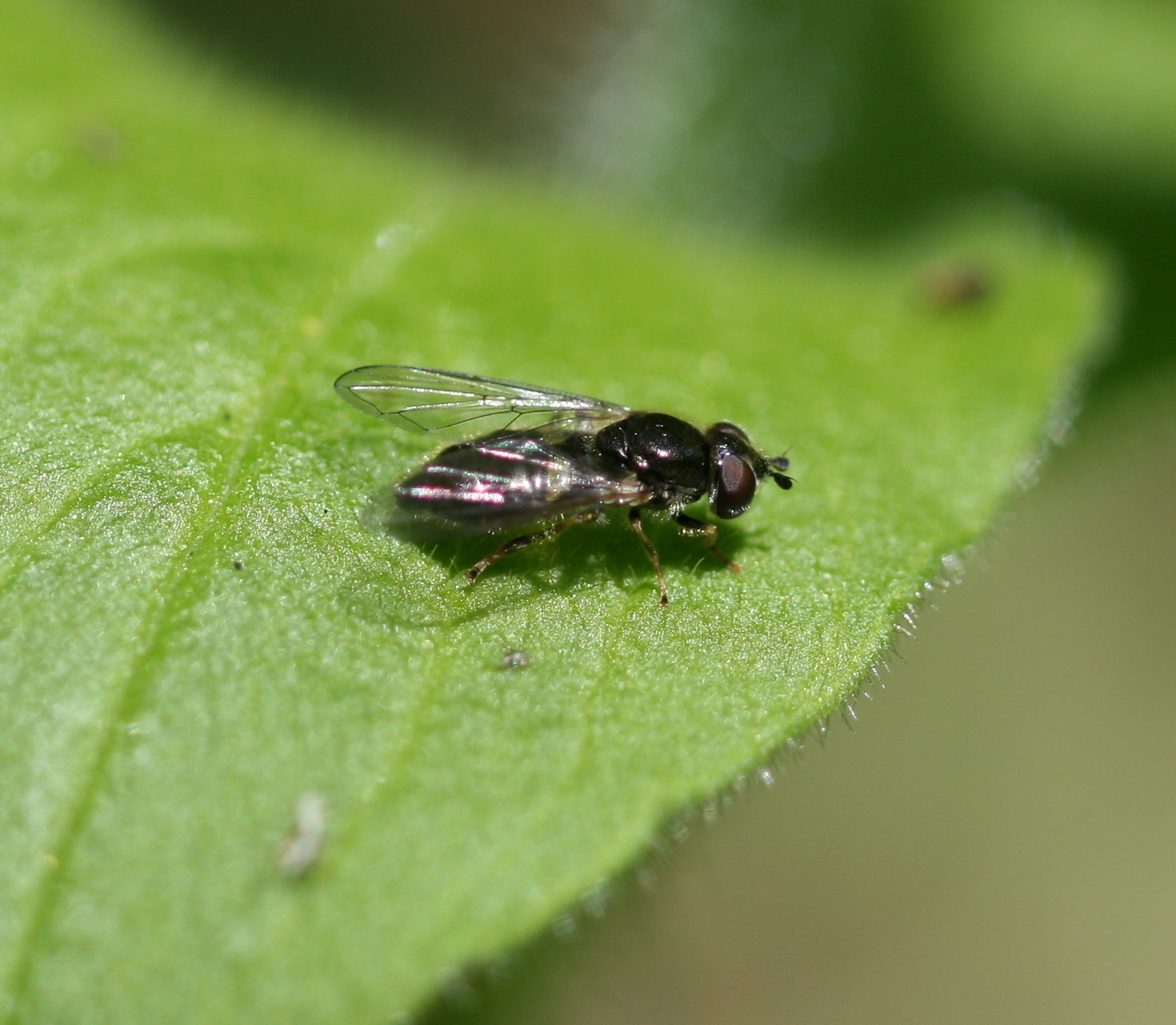
- Pipiza luteitarsis female.jpg

Scientific classification
- Kingdom: Animalia
- Phylum: Arthropoda
- Class: Insecta
- Order: Diptera
- Superfamily: Syrphoidea
- Family: Syrphidae
- Subfamily: Pipizinae
- Genus: Pipiza
- Species: P. luteitarsis

Binomial name
- Pipiza luteitarsis Zetterstedt, 1843

= Pipiza luteitarsis =

Species of fly

Pipiza luteitarsis is a species of Hoverfly, from the family Syrphidae, in the order Diptera.

== Description ==
External images For terms see Morphology of Diptera

Wing length 6·5–8 mm. Front tarsa yellow. See references for determination.

== Distribution ==
Palearctic Fennoscandia South to Belgium and France. Ireland eastwards through Central Europe into European Russia.

== Biology ==
Habitat: Fagus (Beech) and Quercus (Oak) woodland also in mature suburban gardens. Flowers visited include Euphorbia, Prunus, Ranunculus, Tussilago. Flies mid April to end May. Pipiza larvae are predators of gall-forming aphids.
