= Pipiza festiva =

Scientific classification
- Kingdom: Animalia
- Phylum: Arthropoda
- Class: Insecta
- Order: Diptera
- Superfamily: Syrphoidea
- Family: Syrphidae
- Subfamily: Pipizinae
- Genus: Pipiza
- Species: P. festiva

Binomial name
- Pipiza festiva Meigen, 1822

Species of fly

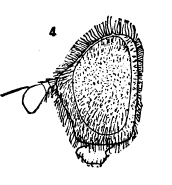
A drawing of a female Pipiza festiva

Pipiza festiva is a species of hoverfly, from the family Syrphidae, in the order Diptera.
