= Heringia salax =

Scientific classification
- Kingdom: Animalia
- Phylum: Arthropoda
- Class: Insecta
- Order: Diptera
- Superfamily: Syrphoidea
- Family: Syrphidae
- Subfamily: Pipizinae
- Genus: Heringia
- Species: H. salax

Binomial name
- Heringia salax (Loew, 1866)

Synonyms
- Pipiza pistica Williston, 1887; Pipiza radicum Walsh and Riley, 1869; Pipiza salax Loew, 1866

Species of fly

Heringia salax (Loew, 1866 ), the Eastern Smoothleg Fly, is a fairly common species of syrphid fly observed in many locations across North America. Hoverflies can remain nearly motionless in flight. The adults are also known as flower flies for they are commonly found on flowers from which they get both energy-giving nectar and protein rich pollen. The larvae are predators on aphids.
