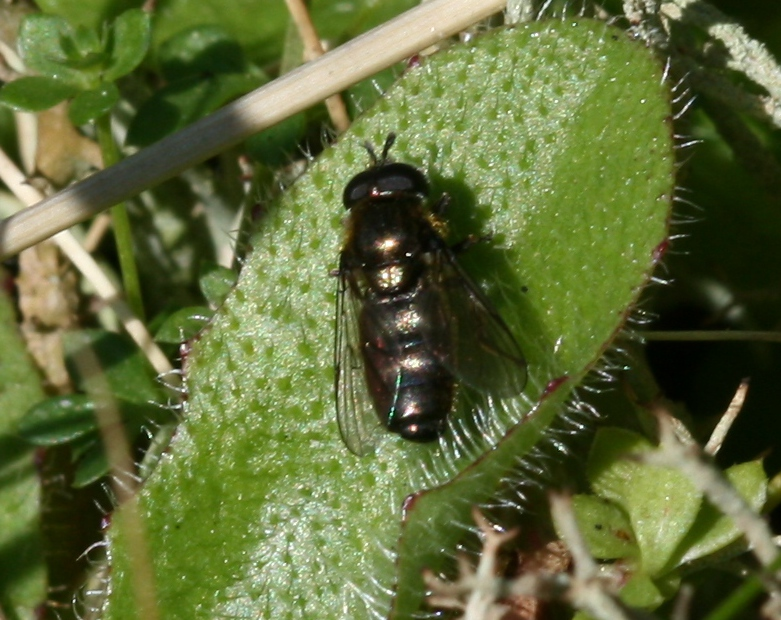
- Pipizella sp. male

Scientific classification
- Kingdom: Animalia
- Phylum: Arthropoda
- Class: Insecta
- Order: Diptera
- Section: Aschiza
- Superfamily: Syrphoidea
- Family: Syrphidae
- Subfamily: Pipizinae
- Genus: Pipizella; Rondani, 1856

Type species
- Mulio virens Fabricius, 1805

= Pipizella =

Genus of flies

Pipizella is a genus of Hoverflies, from the family Syrphidae, in the order Diptera.

== Species ==
- P. altaica Violovitsh, 1981
- P. annulata Macquart, 1829
- P. antennata Violovitsh, 1981
- P. barkalovi Violovitsh, 1981
- P. bayburtica Claussen & Hayat, 1997
- P. beckeri Bradescu, 1986
- P. bispina Simic, 1987
- P. brevis Lucas, 1977
- P. calabra (Goeldlin, 1974)
- P. cantabrica Claussen, 1991
- P. caucasica Skufjin, 1976
- P. certa Violovitsh, 1981
- P. cornuta Kuznetzov, 1987
- P. curvitibia Stackelberg, 1960
- P. divicoi (Goeldlin, 1974)
- P. elegantissima Lucas, 1976
- P. fumida (Goeldlin, 1974)
- P. kuznetzovi Steenis & Lucas, 2011
- P. lyneborgi Torp Pedersen, 1971
- P. maculipennis (Meigen, 1822)
- P. mesasiatica Stackelberg, 1952
- P. mongolorum Stackelberg, 1952
- P. nataliae Kuznetzov, 1987
- P. nigriana (Séguy, 1961)
- P. obscura Steenis & Lucas, 2011
- P. ochreobasalis Steenis & Lucas, 2011
- P. orientalis Steenis & Lucas, 2011
- P. pennina (Goeldlin, 1974)
- P. sibirica Violovitsh, 1981
- P. siciliana Nielsen & Torp, 1973
- P. speighti Verlinden, 1999
- P. thapsiana Kassebeer, 1995
- P. vandergooti Steenis & Lucas, 2011
- P. varipes Meigen, 1822
- P. viduata (Linnaeus, 1758)
- P. virens (Fabricius, 1805)
- P. zeneggenensis (Goeldlin, 1974)
- P. zloti Vujic, 1997
