= Heringia coxalis =

Scientific classification
- Kingdom: Animalia
- Phylum: Arthropoda
- Class: Insecta
- Order: Diptera
- Family: Syrphidae
- Subfamily: Pipizinae
- Genus: Heringia
- Species: H. coxalis

Binomial name
- Heringia coxalis (Curran 1921)

Synonyms
- Cnemodon coxalis Curran, 1921

Species of insect

Heringia coxalis (Curran 1921), the white-faced spikeleg, is a common species of syrphid fly observed across North America, concentrated in the East. Hoverflies can remain nearly motionless in flight. The adults are also known as flower flies for they are commonly found on flowers, from which they get both energy-giving nectar and protein-rich pollen. Larvae are predators of the Balsam woolly adelgid (Adelges piceae).
