= Trichopsomyia apisaon =

Scientific classification
- Kingdom: Animalia
- Phylum: Arthropoda
- Class: Insecta
- Order: Diptera
- Family: Syrphidae
- Subfamily: Pipizinae
- Genus: Trichopsomyia
- Species: T. apisaon

Binomial name
- Trichopsomyia apisaon Walker, 1849

Synonyms
- Paragus transatlanticus Walker, 1849; Pipiza nigribarba Loew, 1866; Pipiza pulchella Williston, 1887; Triglyphus modestus Loew, 1863

Species of fly

Trichopsomyia apisaon, the black-haired psyllid-killer, is a common species of syrphid fly observed all across North America. Hoverflies can remain nearly motionless in flight. The adults are also known as flower flies for they are commonly found on flowers from which they get both energy-giving nectar and protein-rich pollen. Larvae when known are psyllid, aphid and Phylloxera predators.
