= Trichopsomyia recedens =

Scientific classification
- Domain: Eukaryota
- Kingdom: Animalia
- Phylum: Arthropoda
- Class: Insecta
- Order: Diptera
- Family: Syrphidae
- Subfamily: Pipizinae
- Genus: Trichopsomyia
- Species: T. recedens

Binomial name
- Trichopsomyia recedens (Walker, 1852)

Synonyms
- Chrysogaster recedens Walker, 1852; Pipiza fraudulenta Loew, 1866

Species of fly

Trichopsomyia recedens, commonly known as the shadowy psyllid-killer, is a species of syrphid fly observed in widespread locations in North America. Hoverflies can remain nearly motionless in flight. The adults are also known as flower flies for they are commonly found on flowers, from which they get both energy-giving nectar and protein-rich pollen. Larvae when known are psyllid, aphid and Phylloxera predators.
