= Pipiza carbonaria =

Scientific classification
- Kingdom: Animalia
- Phylum: Arthropoda
- Class: Insecta
- Order: Diptera
- Superfamily: Syrphoidea
- Family: Syrphidae
- Subfamily: Pipizinae
- Genus: Pipiza
- Species: P. carbonaria

Binomial name
- Pipiza carbonaria Meigen, 1822

Species of fly

Pipiza carbonaria is a species of hoverfly, from the family Syrphidae, in the order Diptera.
