= Pipiza macrofemoralis =

Scientific classification
- Kingdom: Animalia
- Phylum: Arthropoda
- Class: Insecta
- Order: Diptera
- Family: Syrphidae
- Subfamily: Pipizinae
- Genus: Pipiza
- Species: P. macrofemoralis

Binomial name
- Pipiza macrofemoralis Curran 1921

Species of insect

Pipiza macrofemoralis (Curran, 1921), the large-legged pithead, is a fairly common species of syrphid fly observed in many locations across Northern North America.. Hoverflies can remain nearly motionless in flight. The adults are also known as flower flies for they are commonly found on flowers from which they get both energy-giving nectar and protein-rich pollen. Larvae, when known, are aphid predators.
