= Pipiza puella =

Scientific classification
- Kingdom: Animalia
- Phylum: Arthropoda
- Class: Insecta
- Order: Diptera
- Family: Syrphidae
- Subfamily: Pipizinae
- Genus: Pipiza
- Species: P. puella

Binomial name
- Pipiza puella Williston, 1887

Synonyms
- Pipiza nigrotibiata Curran, 1924; Pipiza severnensis Curran, 1921

Species of fly

Pipiza puella, the sumac gall pithead, is a species of syrphid fly observed in eastern and Central United States, Canada and Norway. Hoverflies can remain nearly motionless in flight. The adults are also known as flower flies for they are commonly found on flowers from which they get both energy-giving nectar and protein rich pollen. Larvae when known are aphid predators.
