= Pipiza nigripilosa =

Scientific classification
- Kingdom: Animalia
- Phylum: Arthropoda
- Class: Insecta
- Order: Diptera
- Family: Syrphidae
- Subfamily: Pipizinae
- Genus: Pipiza
- Species: P. nigripilosa

Binomial name
- Pipiza nigripilosa Williston, 1887

Synonyms
- Pipiza tricolor Curran, 1921

Species of fly

Pipiza nigripilosa, the pale-haired pithead, is a common hoverfly species in the eastern United States, which can remain nearly motionless in flight. The adults are known as flower flies, commonly found on flowers, from which they eat energy-giving nectar and protein-rich pollen. Its larvae are aphid predators.
