= Trichopsomyia banksi =

Scientific classification
- Kingdom: Animalia
- Phylum: Arthropoda
- Clade: Pancrustacea
- Class: Insecta
- Order: Diptera
- Family: Syrphidae
- Subfamily: Pipizinae
- Genus: Trichopsomyia
- Species: T. banksi

Binomial name
- Trichopsomyia banksi (Curran, 1921)

Synonyms
- Pipizella banksi Curran, 1921; Pipiza banksi (Curran, 1921)

Species of fly

Trichopsomyia banksi , the white-faced psyllid killer, is an uncommon species of syrphid fly observed across North America. Hoverflies can remain nearly motionless in flight. The adults are also known as flower flies for they are commonly found on flowers from which they get both energy-giving nectar and protein-rich pollen. Larvae are unknown but other members of this genus are psyllid, aphid and Phylloxera predators.

== Distribution ==
Illinois, Virginia (type specimen), Nebraska and Florida.
