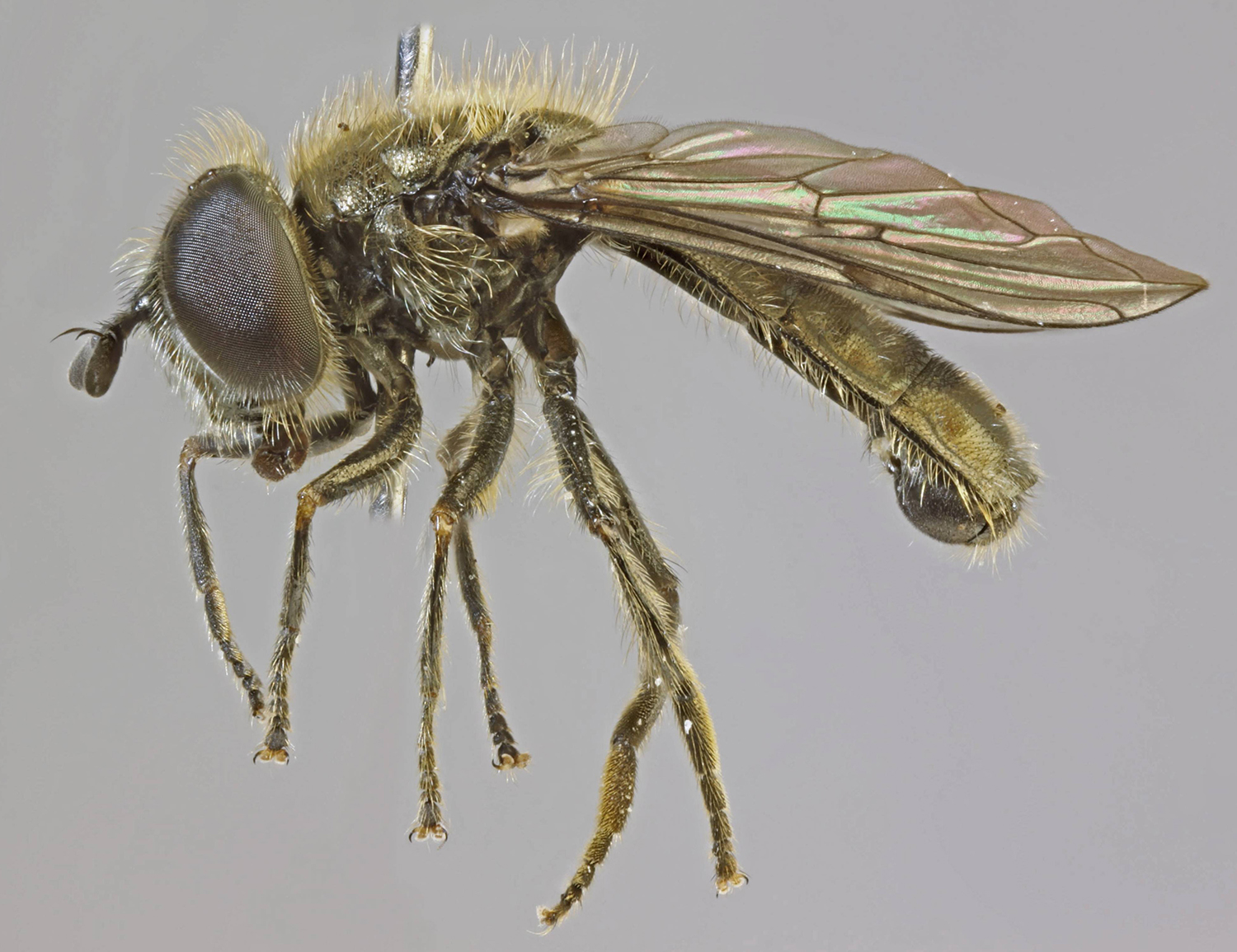

Scientific classification
- Kingdom: Animalia
- Phylum: Arthropoda
- Class: Insecta
- Order: Diptera
- Family: Syrphidae
- Genus: Pipizella
- Species: P. viduata

Binomial name
- Pipizella viduata (Linnaeus, 1758)

Synonyms
- Heringia geniculata Curtis, 1837; Musca viduata Linnaeus, 1758; Pipiza varipes Meigen, 1822; Pipizella geniculata (Curtis, 1837); Pipizella varipes (Meigen, 1822)

= Pipizella viduata =

Species of fly

Pipizella viduata is a species of Hoverfly, from the family Syrphidae, in the order Diptera.

== Description ==
External images For terms see Morphology of Diptera
Wing length 3 ·7 5-5 ·25 mm Genitalia figured by Van Veen (refs), small species, basitarsi dusky or dark brown. See references for determination.

== Distribution ==
Palearctic Fennoscandia South to Iberia and the Mediterranean basin. Ireland East Europe into European Russia and the Caucasus then to Siberia.

== Biology ==
Woodland, scrub, dune grassland, heathland and unimproved pasture, grassy clearings in woodland Flowers visited include umbellifers, Euphorbia, Galium, Potentilla erecta. Flies April to October
