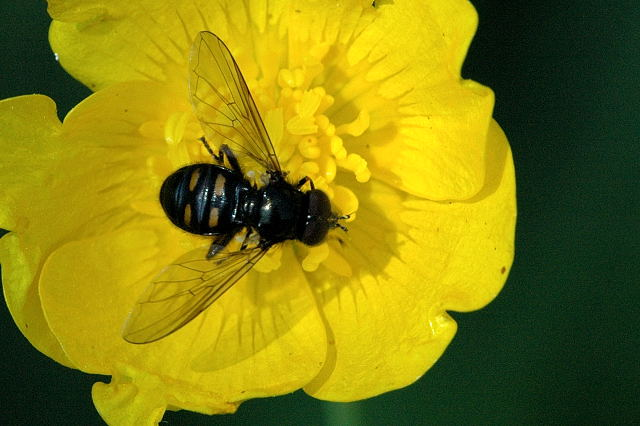
- Pipiza quadrimaculata

Scientific classification
- Kingdom: Animalia
- Phylum: Arthropoda
- Clade: Pancrustacea
- Class: Insecta
- Order: Diptera
- Section: Aschiza
- Superfamily: Syrphoidea
- Family: Syrphidae
- Subfamily: Pipizinae
- Genus: Pipiza; Fallén, 1810

Type species
- Musca noctiluca Linnaeus, 1758

Synonyms
- Nycteria Swinderen, 1822; Cryptopipiza Mutin, 1998

= Pipiza =

Genus of flies

Pipiza is a genus of hoverflies, from the family Syrphidae, in the order Diptera. Most are dark hoverflies.

== Biology ==
Larvae are feeders on gall forming aphids.

== Species ==
- Pipiza abdominalis (Shiraki & Edashige, 1953)
- Pipiza accola Violovitsh, 1985
- Pipiza angulatus (Say, 1835)
- Pipiza atrata Curran, 1922
- Pipiza aurantipes (Bigot, 1857)
- Pipiza aurea Violovitsh, 1985
- Pipiza austriaca Meigen, 1822
- Pipiza bellula (Williston, 1891)
- Pipiza bimaculata Meigen, 1822
- Pipiza carbonaria Meigen, 1822
- Pipiza catharinensis (Enderlein, 1938)
- Pipiza claripennis (Shannon, 1933)
- Pipiza convexifrons (Violovich, 1985)
- Pipiza crassipes Bigot, 1884
- Pipiza cribbeni ( Coovert, 1996)
- Pipiza cuprea (Violovich, 1985)
- Pipiza curtilinea (Cheng, Huang & Duan, 1998)
- Pipiza davidsoni Curran, 1921
- Pipiza distincta Curran, 1921
- Pipiza fasciata Meigen, 1822
- Pipiza femoralis Loew, 1866
- Pipiza fenestrata Meigen, 1822
- Pipiza festiva Meigen, 1822
- Pipiza flavimaculata ( Matsumura, 1918)
- Pipiza flavipes (Philippi, 1865)
- Pipiza hongheensis (Huo, Ren & Zheng, 2007)
- Pipiza inornata (Matsumura, 1916)
- Pipiza lugubris (Fabricius, 1775)
- Pipiza luteibarba (Vujic, Radenkovic & Polic, 2008)
- Pipiza luteitarsis Zetterstedt, 1843
- Pipiza macrofemoralis Curran, 1921
- Pipiza magnomaculata (Violovich, 1985)
- Pipiza maritima ( Mutin, 2002)
- Pipiza moerens (Doleschall, 1858)
- Pipiza morionellus Zetterstedt, 1843
- Pipiza mutini (Violovich, 1985)
- Pipiza nielseni Violovich, 1985
- Pipiza nigripilosa Williston, 1887
- Pipiza nitidifrons (Mutin, 2002)
- Pipiza notabila (Violovich, 1985)
- Pipiza noctiluca (Linnaeus, 1758)
- Pipiza notata Meigen, 1822
- Pipiza nox (Violovich, 1978)
- Pipiza obscura Macquart, 1834
- Pipiza obscuripennis (Meigen, 1835)
- Pipiza poday ( Mutin, 2002)
- Pipiza puella Williston, 1887
- Pipiza quadrimaculata (Panzer, 1804)
- Pipiza signata Meigen, 1822
- Pipiza singula (Violovich, 1985)
- Pipiza subinflatifrons (Coovert, 1996)
- Pipiza triste (Philippi, 1865)
- Pipiza tristis ( Violovich, 1987)
- Pipiza tuvinica (Violovich, 1987)
- Pipiza uleana (Enderlein, 1938)
- Pipiza unimaculata (Cheng, Huang & Duan, 1998)
- Pipiza westsibirica( Violovich, 1985)
- Pipiza yezoensis Matsumura, 1916
