= Pipizella maculipennis =

Scientific classification
- Kingdom: Animalia
- Phylum: Arthropoda
- Class: Insecta
- Order: Diptera
- Family: Syrphidae
- Genus: Pipizella
- Species: P. maculipennis

Binomial name
- Pipizella maculipennis (Meigen, 1822)

Synonyms
- Pipiza maculipennis Meigen, 1822

Species of fly

Pipizella maculipennis is a species of hoverfly, from the family Syrphidae, in the order Diptera.
