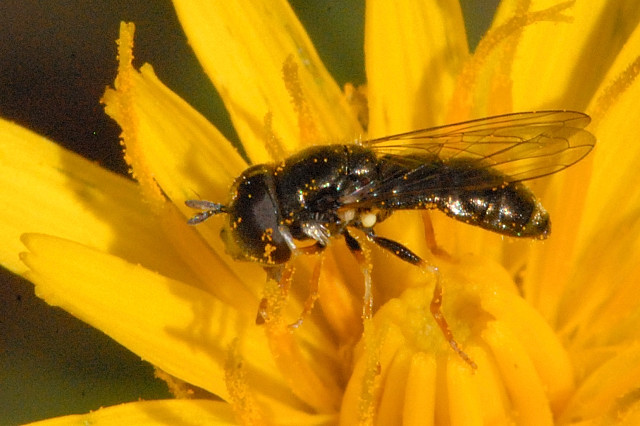

Scientific classification
- Kingdom: Animalia
- Phylum: Arthropoda
- Class: Insecta
- Order: Diptera
- Family: Syrphidae
- Genus: Pipizella
- Species: P. annulata

Binomial name
- Pipizella annulata Macquart, 1829

= Pipizella annulata =

Species of fly

Pipizella annulata is a species of hoverfly, from the family Syrphidae, in the order Diptera.
