= Heringia calcarata =

Scientific classification
- Kingdom: Animalia
- Phylum: Arthropoda
- Class: Insecta
- Order: Diptera
- Family: Syrphidae
- Subfamily: Pipizinae
- Genus: Heringia
- Species: H. calcarata

Binomial name
- Heringia calcarata (Loew) 1866

Synonyms
- Pipiza calcarata Loew, 1866; Cnemodon calcarata Loew, 1866

Species of fly

Heringia calcarata, the opaque spikeleg, is an uncommon species of syrphid fly observed in North America Hoverflies can remain nearly motionless in flight. The adults are also known as flower flies for they are commonly found on flowers from which they get both energy-giving nectar and protein rich pollen. Larvae are aphid predators.
