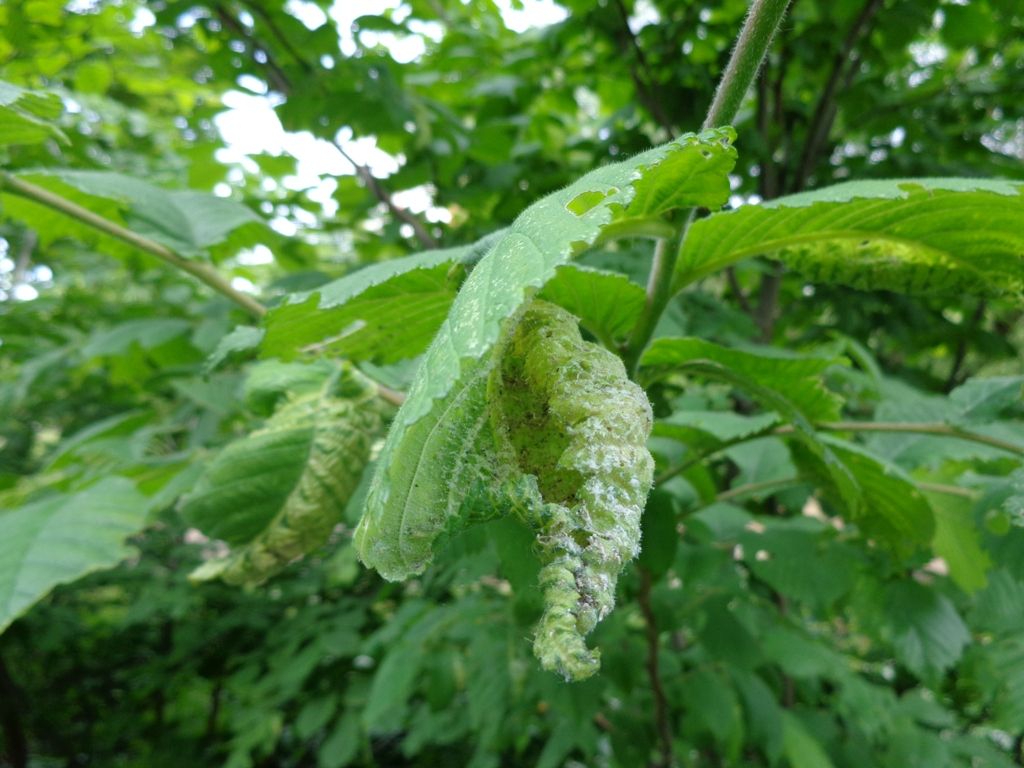
- Gall on an elm leaf

Scientific classification
- Kingdom: Animalia
- Phylum: Arthropoda
- Class: Insecta
- Order: Hemiptera
- Suborder: Sternorrhyncha
- Family: Aphididae
- Genus: Eriosoma
- Species: E. ulmi

Binomial name
- Eriosoma ulmi (Linnaeus, 1758)

Synonyms
- Chermes ulmi Linnaeus, 1758

= Eriosoma ulmi =

Species of true bug

Eriosoma ulmi, the elm-currant aphid, is a species of aphid in the family Aphididae found in Asia and Europe. It is a true bug and sucks sap from plants. It was described by Carl Linnaeus in his Systema Naturae, published in 1758. The mite causes abnormal plant growths, known as galls on their primary host, elm trees (Ulmus species). To complete there life-cycle they feed on a secondary host, the roots of currant bushes (Ribes species).

== Description of the gall ==
Primary host

The galls are yellowish-green or pinkish, contain wax and form when one half of a leaf becomes crinkled and rolls inwards to form a tubular pouch. They are found on American elm (Ulmus americana), wych elm (Ulmus glabra), field elm (Ulmus minor), English elm (Ulmus procera), Siberian elm (Ulmus pumila) and rock elm (Ulmus thomasii). Numerous aphids living in the gall in spring and early summer, are browish to dull green and covered in wax.

Winged aphids (all female) leave the gall in June and July, mating and living in the secondary host; currant bushes. The aphids live on the roots of currant bushes where they reproduce. The male and female progeny fly back to the elms in the autumn where the mated females lay eggs which overwinter.

== Predator ==
Anthocoris gallarumulmi is a predator of the aphids in the gall.

== Similar galls ==
Eriosoma grossulariae galls and aphids are similar but are not covered or contain wax.

== Distribution ==
The aphid is found in Asia and most of Europe. In Asia it is found in the Oriental Region and Near East, while in Europe, it is found from Russia to Ireland and the Iberian Peninsula to Scandinavia. In Great Britain it is common and widespread.
