= Pipizella virens =

Scientific classification
- Kingdom: Animalia
- Phylum: Arthropoda
- Class: Insecta
- Order: Diptera
- Family: Syrphidae
- Genus: Pipizella
- Species: P. virens

Binomial name
- Pipizella virens (Fabricius, 1805)

Synonyms
- Mulio virens Fabricius, 1805; Pipiza interrupta Haliday, 1833; Pipizella interrupta (Haliday, 1833)

Species of fly

Pipizella virens is a species of hoverfly, from the family Syrphidae, in the order Diptera.
