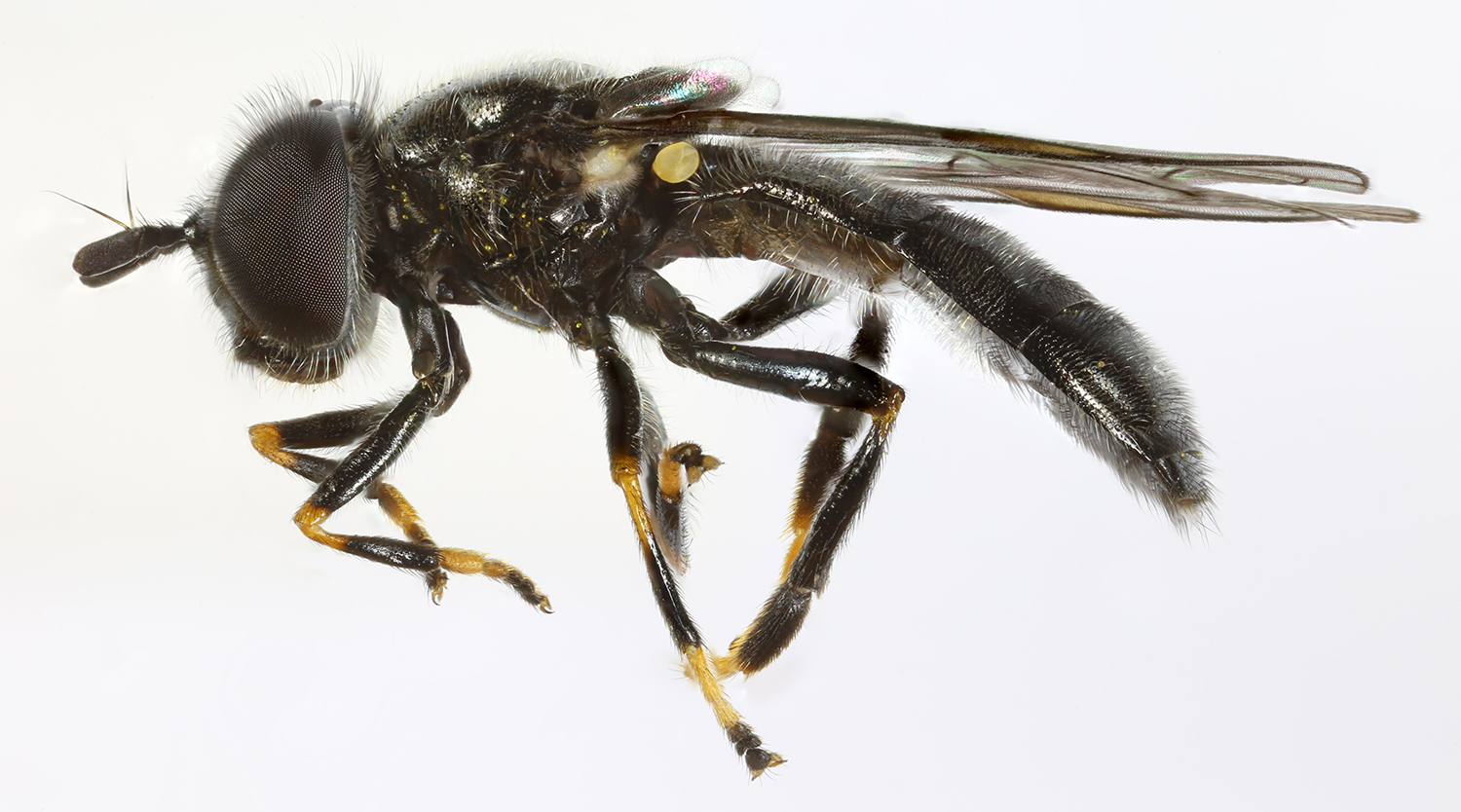
- Trichopsomyia flavitarsis

Scientific classification
- Kingdom: Animalia
- Phylum: Arthropoda
- Class: Insecta
- Order: Diptera
- Family: Syrphidae
- Genus: Trichopsomyia
- Species: T. flavitarsis

Binomial name
- Trichopsomyia flavitarsis (Meigen, 1822)

= Trichopsomyia flavitarsis =

Species of fly

Trichopsomyia flavitarsis is a European species of hoverfly.

== Description ==
External images For terms see Morphology of Diptera
Wing length 4–6 mm. Frons and face glittering black. Tergite 2 with a pair of yellow marks, without dust spots. Male tarsus 3 broad and flat, with snow-white pilosity. See references for determination.

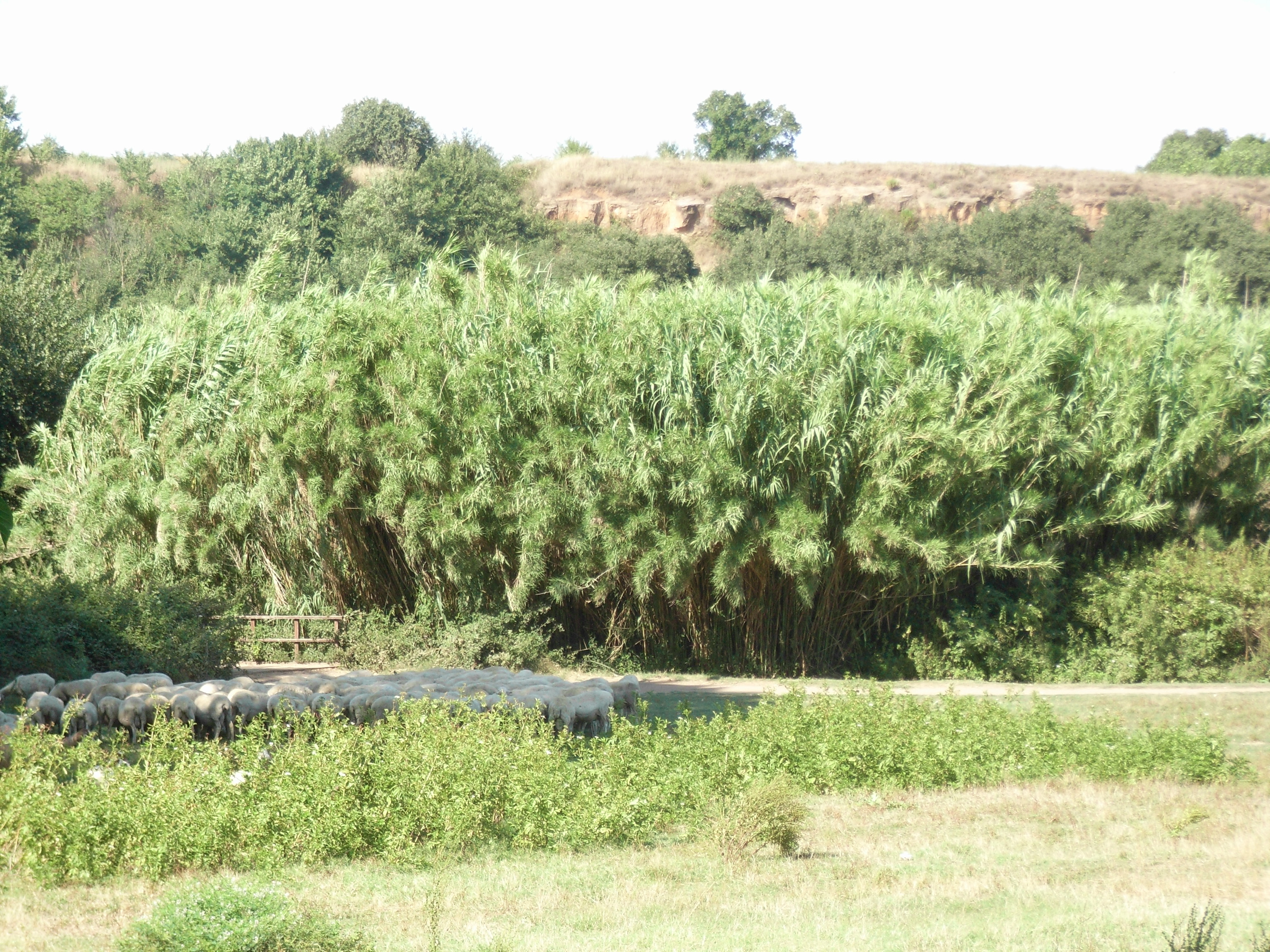
Habitat.Italy

== Habits ==
A wetland and woodland species.

== Distribution ==
Palearctic Fennoscandia South to the Pyrenees and north Spain. Ireland eastwards through North Europe and mountainous regions of Central Europe into European Russia and onto the Pacific coast.
