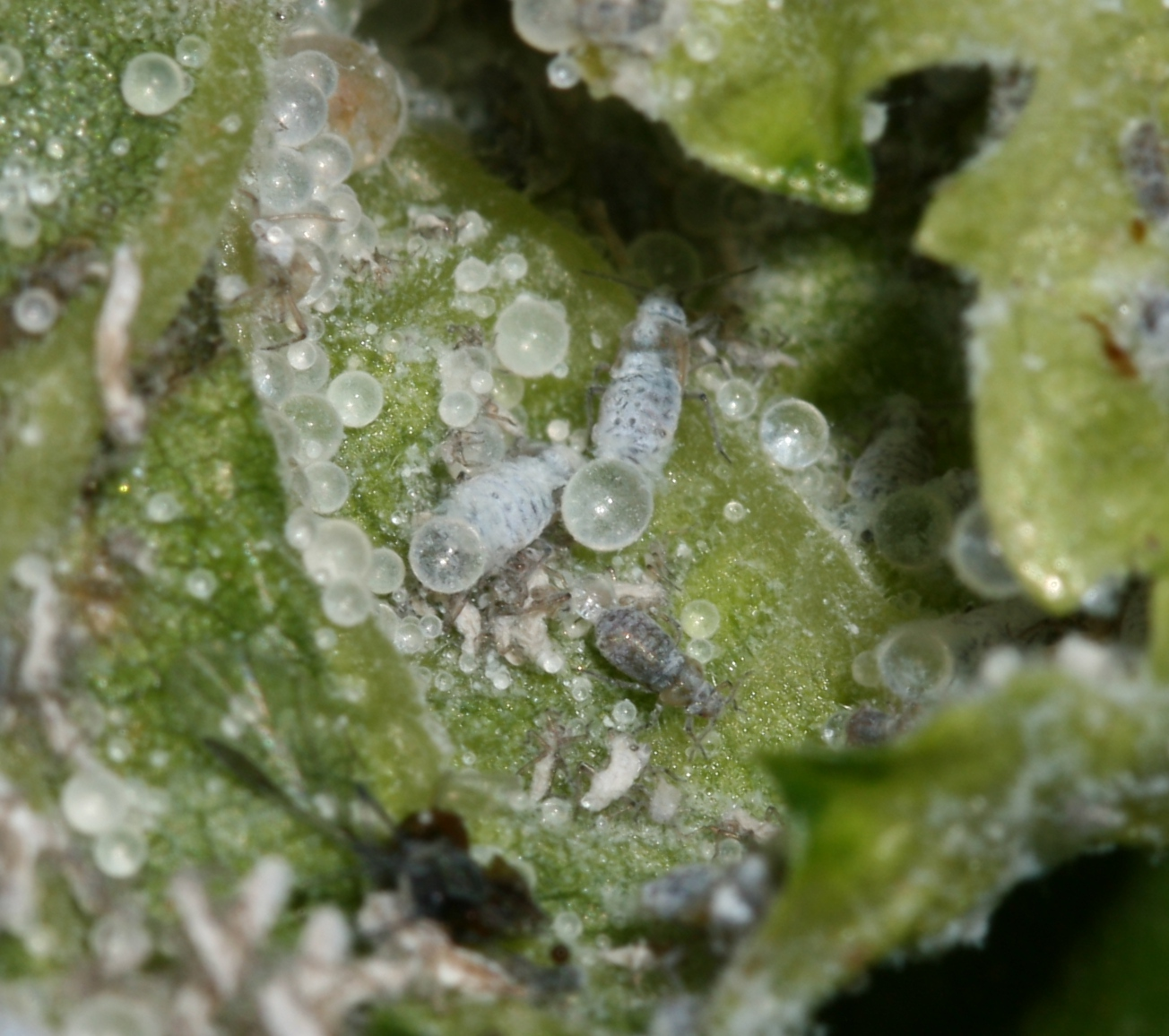
- Eriosoma ulmi

Scientific classification
- Domain: Eukaryota
- Kingdom: Animalia
- Phylum: Arthropoda
- Class: Insecta
- Order: Hemiptera
- Suborder: Sternorrhyncha
- Family: Aphididae
- Subfamily: Eriosomatinae
- Tribe: Eriosomatini
- Genus: Eriosoma; Leach, 1818

= Eriosoma (aphid) =

Genus of true bugs

Eriosoma is a genus of true bugs belonging to the family Aphididae.

The species of this genus are found in Europe, Australia and Northern America.

Species:

- Eriosoma alabastrum
- Eriosoma americanum (C.V.Riley, 1879) — woolly elm aphid
- Eriosoma anncharlotteae Danielsson, 1979
- Eriosoma flavum Jancke, 1930
- Eriosoma grossulariae (Schüle, 1887)
- Eriosoma lanigerum (Hausemann, 1802) — woolly apple aphid
- Eriosoma lanuginosum (Hartig, 1839)
- Eriosoma patchiae (Börner & Blunck, 1916)
- Eriosoma pyricola (A.C.Baker & Davidson, 1916) — pear root aphid
- Eriosoma sorbiradicis Danielsson, 1979
- Eriosoma ulmi (L., 1879) — elm-currant aphid
