= Heringia canadensis =

Scientific classification
- Kingdom: Animalia
- Phylum: Arthropoda
- Class: Insecta
- Order: Diptera
- Family: Syrphidae
- Genus: Heringia
- Species: H. canadensis

Binomial name
- Heringia canadensis Curran, 1921

Species of fly

Heringia canadensis , the Canadian smoothleg, is a fairly common species of syrphid fly observed in many parts of North America. Hoverflies can remain nearly motionless in flight. The adults are also known as flower flies for they are commonly found on flowers from which they get both energy-giving nectar and protein-rich pollen. Larvae when known are aphid predators.
