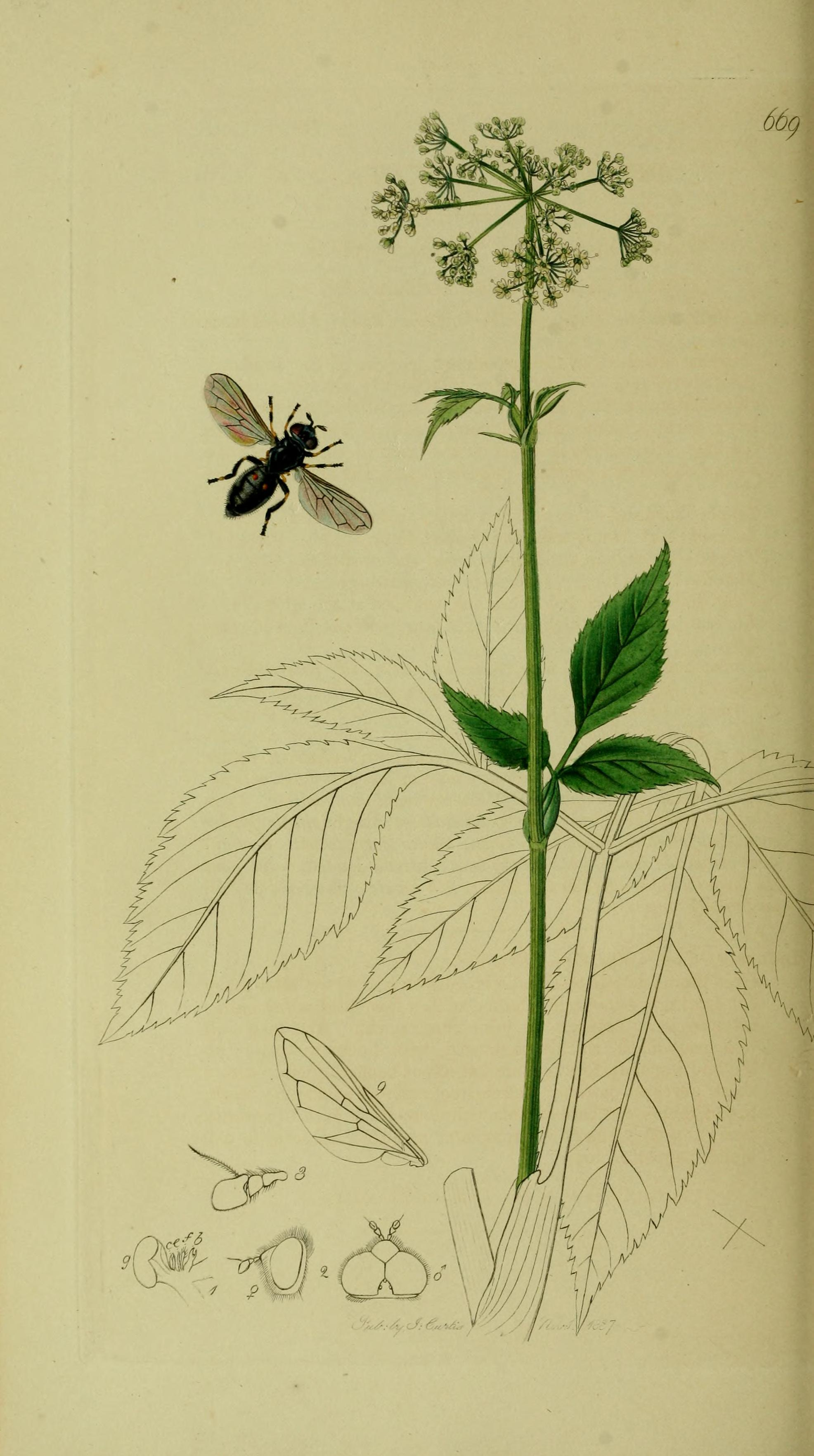
- Trichopsomyia flavitarsisIllustration in British Entomology

Scientific classification
- Kingdom: Animalia
- Phylum: Arthropoda
- Class: Insecta
- Order: Diptera
- Section: Aschiza
- Superfamily: Syrphoidea
- Family: Syrphidae
- Subfamily: Pipizinae
- Genus: Trichopsomyia; Williston, 1888

Type species
- Trichopsomyia polita Williston, 1888

= Trichopsomyia =

Genus of flies

Trichopsomyia is a genus of Hoverflies, from the family Syrphidae (flower flies), in the order Diptera.

== Biology ==
Hover flies like the Trichopsomyia are small flies with large heads and eyes, and small antennae. Their bodies are medium to slender, with a waist that is not significantly narrow, unless it is a wasp mimicking species. They have one pair of clear wings, and the banded forms have yellow and black bands. Hoverflies resemble wasps or bees because of their black and yellow-striped abdomens. However, they are actually members of a fly family that have evolved to mimic wasps and bees for protection.

Hoverfly larvae are flattened, legless and maggot-like. Most are green or brown in colour. They are carnivorous and eat aphids.

== Species ==
- Trichopsomyia antillensis (Thompson, 1981)
- Trichopsomyia apisaon Walker, 1849
- Trichopsomyia australis (Johnson, 1907)
- Trichopsomyia currani (Fluke, 1937)
- Trichopsomyia banksi Curran, 1921)
- Trichopsomyia biglumis (Matsumura, 1916)
- Trichopsomyia boliviensis (Shannon, 1927)
- Trichopsomyia flavitarsis (Meigen, 1822)
- Trichopsomyia granditibialis (Fluke, 1937)
- Trichopsomyia lasiotibialis (Fluke, 1937)
- Trichopsomyia joratensis Goeldlin, 1997
- Trichopsomyia litoralis Vockeroth, 1988
- Trichopsomyia longicornis (Williston, 1888)
- Trichopsomyia lucida (Meigen, 1822)
- Trichopsomyia nigritarsis (Curran, 1924)
- Trichopsomyia occidentalis (Townsend, 1897)
- Trichopsomyia ochrozona (Stackelberg, 1952)
- Trichopsomyia pilosa (van Steenis & Wyatt, 2020)
- Trichopsomyia polita Williston, 1888
- Trichopsomyia pubescens (Loew, 1863)
- Trichopsomyia puella (Williston, 1888)
- Trichopsomyia recedens (Walker, 1852)
- Trichopsomyia rufithoracica (Curran, 1921)
- Trichopsomyia similis (Curran, 1924)
- Trichopsomyia tuberculata (Williston, 1888)
- Trichopsomyia tshapigou (Kuznetzov, 1990)
- Trichopsomyia urania (Hull, 1949)
