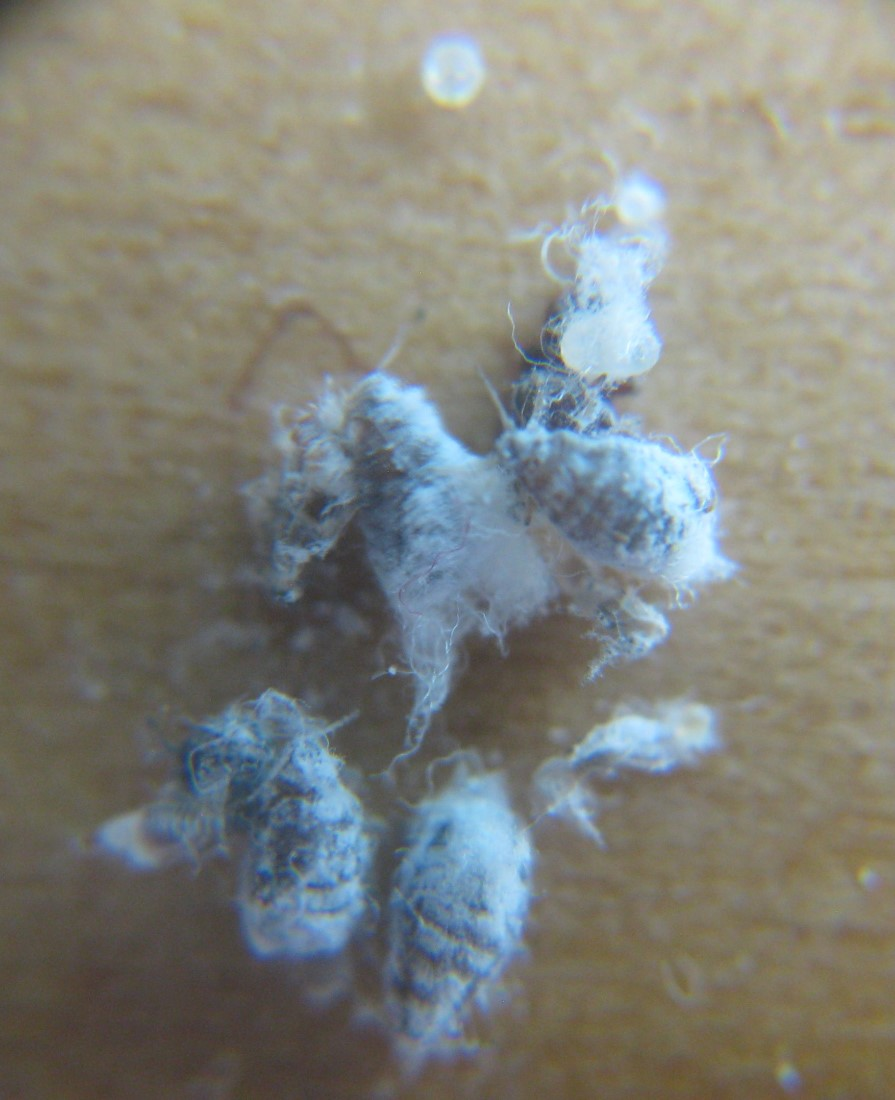
- Several young adult woolly elm aphids emerging from wool, with multiple undeveloped white round eggs present

Scientific classification
- Domain: Eukaryota
- Kingdom: Animalia
- Phylum: Arthropoda
- Class: Insecta
- Order: Hemiptera
- Suborder: Sternorrhyncha
- Family: Aphididae
- Genus: Eriosoma
- Species: E. americanum

Binomial name
- Eriosoma americanum (C.V.Riley, 1879)

= Eriosoma americanum =

Species of insect

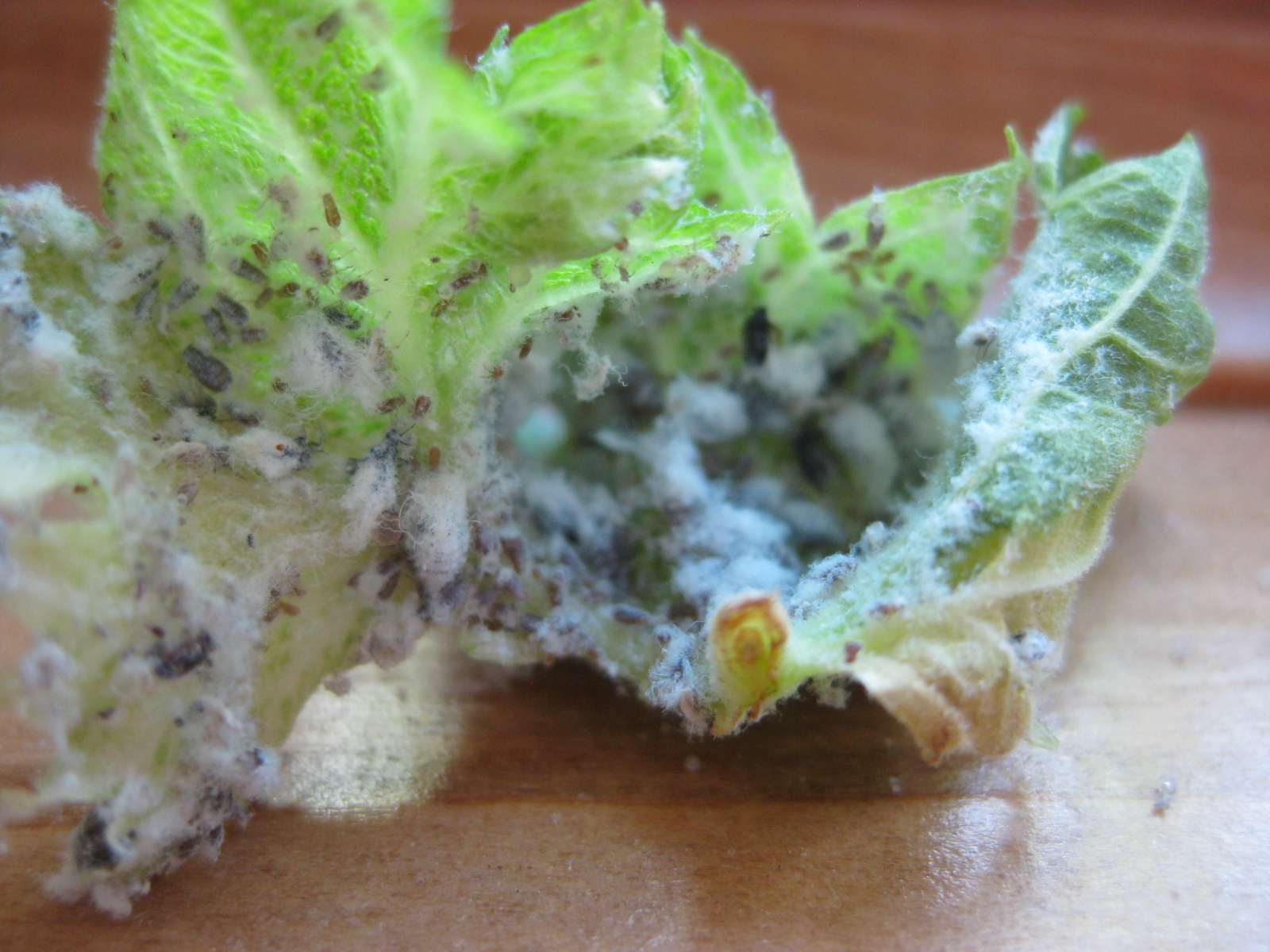
Elm leaf infested with woolly elm aphids in different stages of development

Eriosoma americanum, the woolly elm aphid, is an aphid native to North America, found where Saskatoon (Amelanchier alnifolia) and American elm (Ulmus americana) trees are established.

The aphid feeds on the Saskatoon in late spring through fall, and the American elm during both early spring and late fall.

Symptoms of American elm infestations include curled elm leaves, later accompanied by masses of visible dark areas and cottony masses. As with other aphids, honeydew may be found on infected leaves, excreted by the aphids after feeding on the plant's sap.

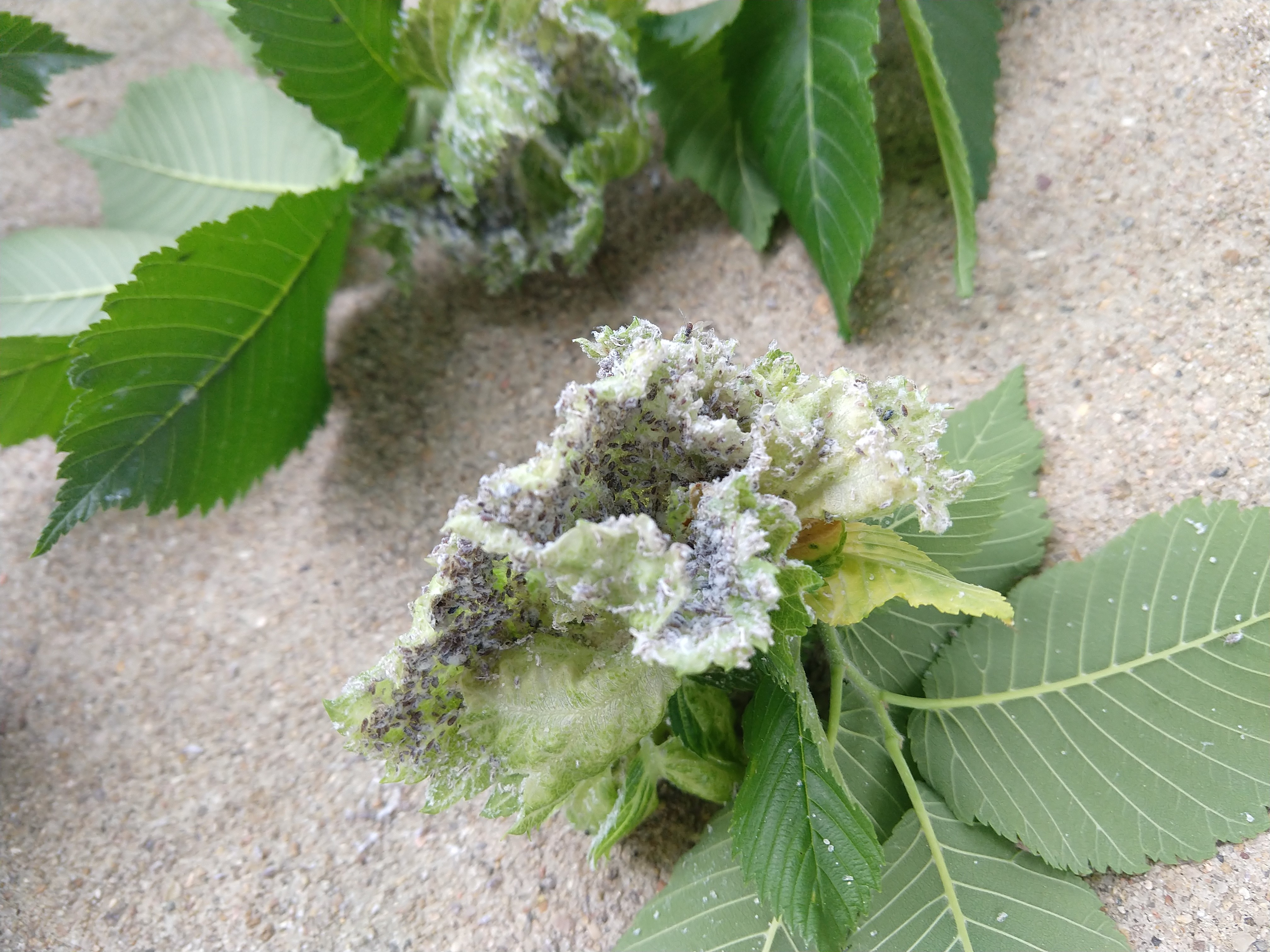
American elm leaves with woolly elm aphid infestation. Curled elm leaves are characteristic of the effects of the aphids, even prior to cottony masses being apparent.
