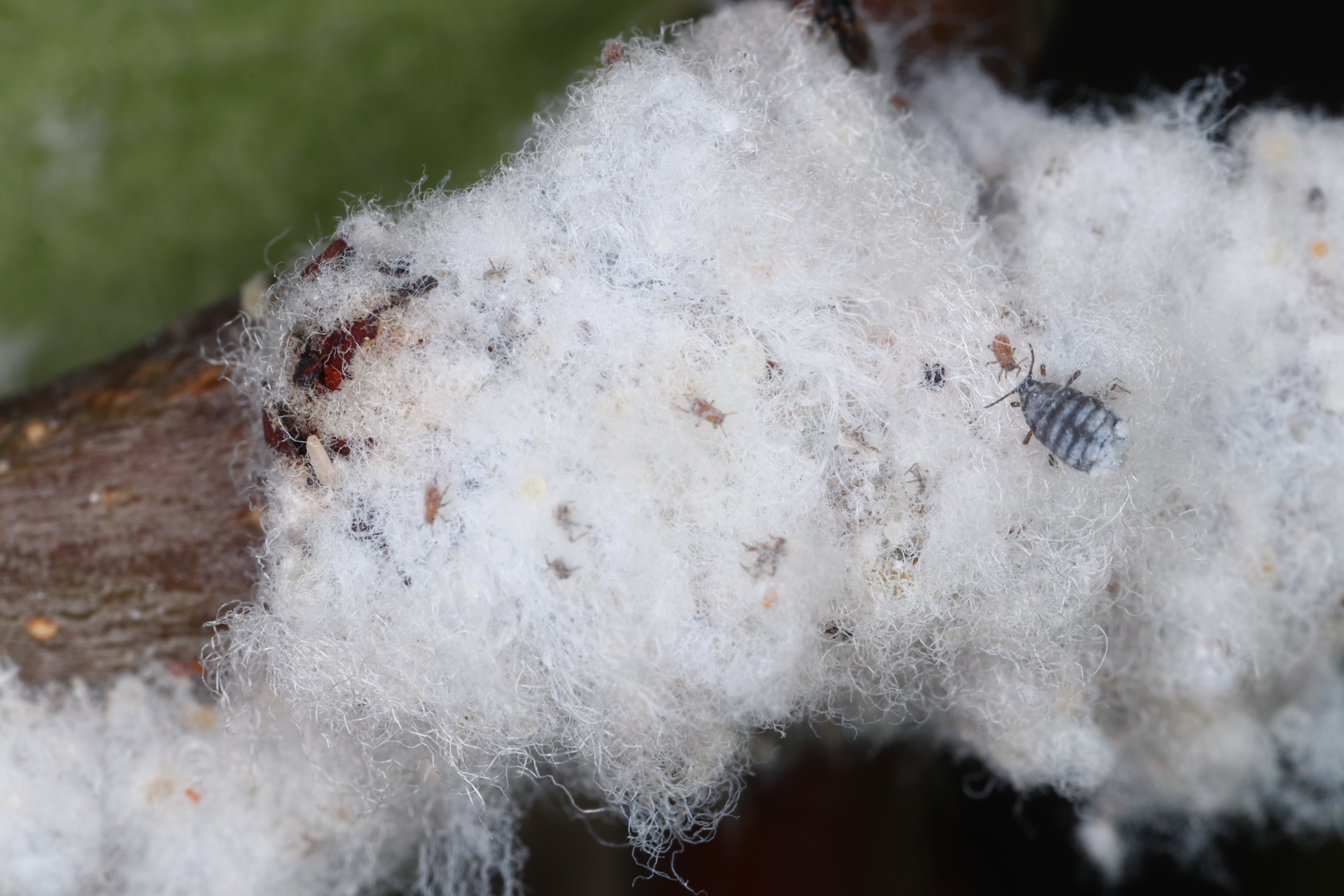
- Woolly aphids on an apple tree branch.

Scientific classification
- Kingdom: Animalia
- Phylum: Arthropoda
- Class: Insecta
- Order: Hemiptera
- Suborder: Sternorrhyncha
- Family: Aphididae
- Genus: Eriosoma
- Species: E. lanigerum

Binomial name
- Eriosoma lanigerum (Hausmann, 1802)

Synonyms
- Aphis lanigera (Hausmann, 1802); Aphis lanigerum Hausmann, 1802; Coccus mali Bingley, 1803; Eriosoma lanata (Salisbury, 1816); Eriosoma mali Leach, 1818; Mimaphidus lanata (Salisbury, 1816); Mimaphidus lanigerum (Hausmann, 1802); Mimaphidus mali (Leach, 1818); Myzoxyles lanigerum (Hausmann, 1802); Myzoxyles mali (Leach, 1918); Myzoxylos lanata (Salisbury, 1816); Myzoxylus laniger; Myzoxylus lanigerus (Hausmann, 1802); Myzoxylus mali Blot, 1831; Schizoneura lanigera Gillette, 1908

= Eriosoma lanigerum =

Woolly apple aphid

Species of true bug

Eriosoma lanigerum, the woolly apple aphid, woolly aphid or American blight, is an aphid in the superfamily Aphidoidea in the order Hemiptera. It is a true bug and sucks sap from plants.

== Description ==
The adults of Eriosoma lanigerum are small to medium-sized aphids, up to 2mm long, and have an elliptical shape. They have sooty-brown antennae with six segments and the colour of the tibias varies from dark brown to yellowish. When the adults are crushed they leave a blood red stain.

They are reddish brown to purple in colour; however, the colour is normally hidden by the white cotton-like secretion from the specialised glands in the aphid's abdomen, which gives it the common name of woolly apple aphid. The wax is produced after each moult; thus, newly moulted individuals lack the wax coating. The coating is thought to prevent the aphids from being contaminated by their own honeydew secretions, but it may also produce a shelter from the weather, parasites and predators. The presence of this wooly substance distinguishes E. lanigerum from any other aphid occurring on apple trees.

In many populations reproduction is wholly asexual and nymphs are produced by parthenogenesis. The nymphs are salmon pink in colour with dark eyes and circular cornicles which are slightly raised from the surface of the abdomen. The nymphs go through four instar moults before becoming an imago. The earliest stages are known as crawlers and they do not produce the waxy filaments until they settle to feed. The hibernating nymphs are very dark green, almost black, although they may be paler and can be dingy yellowish-brown and lack the secreted white waxy covering.

== Distribution ==
E. lanigerum is native to North America but it is now found in all of the regions of the world where apples are grown. It was first recorded from Great Britain in 1787.

== Life cycle ==
In cooler areas E. lanigerum spends the winter months as a nymph on the roots of its host plant or in the more sheltered above ground portions of the host such as under bark on the trunk or main branches. Where sexual reproduction occurs they will also overwinter as eggs and this occurs when elms are prevalent with the eggs being laid into crevices in the bark. The eggs hatch out into wingless "stem mothers" who begin to give birth to nymphs by parthenogenesis. Nymph colonies wintering above ground may be wiped out by severe winter weather.

In spring (April in Great Britain), the colonies begin to produce young which infest the host tree and if there are no above ground colonies they move up the tree until almost the whole tree is covered in aphid colonies, which prefer to be sited at the axils of leaves on terminal shoots. Where the population levels are high almost every leaf on the tree will have a colony at its base. The third generation of young produced grow into winged adult females which are capable of sexual reproduction. each female producing a single egg, but these can only develop on the American elm Ulmus americana. The males are wingless. Each aphid may give birth to up to five live young a day allowing the rapid growth of colonies, with a total of over 100 nymphs in its life. The aphids feed on sap by piercing the outer integument of the host where it is thinnest and excrete a substance known as honeydew which contains a high proportion of sugars. There can be between eight and twelve generations in a year, depending on the summer temperatures.

In its native range in north eastern North America the winged adults, or alates migrate at the end of the summer to overwinter on elms but in regions where there are no elms the fate of these alates is not known and all observed reproduction is by parthenogenesis. Elm is the primary host species and it appears that egg production on other species, such as apple trees, is rare and that eggs laid on apple always fail to hatch.

== Impact on apple trees ==
Where colonies of E. lanigerum feed on twigs and roots the tree forms galls, which are small initially but increase in size over time and are most damaging when they are formed among the roots. Continued feeding in the roots can destroy the roots and consequently reduce the growth of the tree or kill it.

The aphids are attracted to the sunken sites caused by the perennial canker fungus Cryptosporiopsis perennans and the galls are then the most frequent places on the tree for the fungus to re-infect it. The galls can also allow infection by Gloeosporium sp. The galls are more sensitive to cold weather than the surrounding tissue and burst at -18 °C(0 °F), the resulting damage providing the fungus with an entry site for reinfection.

As the aphids feed they produce a honeydew which drips onto the fruit allowing the growth of sooty mould which impacts the saleability of the fruit. The honeydew can also create unpleasant conditions for orchard workers to work in due to high levels of sticky honeydew excreted. The honeydew can also cover the leaves allowing the mould to grow there too. The aphids can also infest the apples, especially on varieties with an open calyx when the aphis can feed on the apple core.

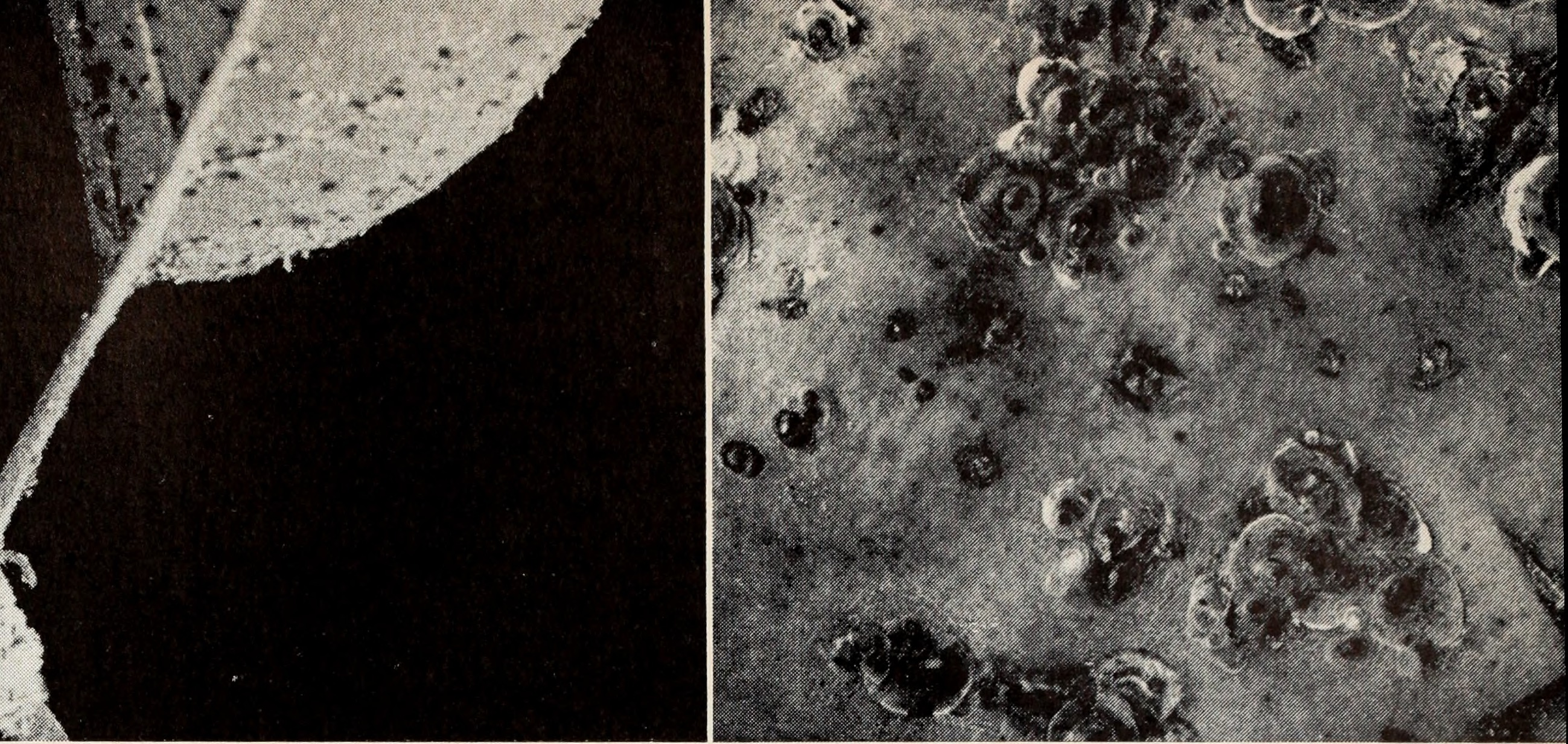
Infestation of E. lanigerum on apple in California

== Control ==
Eriosoma lanigerum infestations have increased in the North-western United States as apple growers have reduced the use of organophosphate pesticides; it is thought that the use of these chemicals to control the codling moth in orchards also repressed the infestation by the aphids.

The aphelinid wasp Aphelinus mali is used as a biological control and this wasp has been deliberately or accidentally introduced into most regions where the woolly apple aphid occurs. When they have been parasitised by the wasps the aphids cease wax production and turn black in colour. Sometimes it is possible to see a circular hole on the upper surface of the aphid which the adult wasp created when it emerged from the body of its host.

As well as the parasitoid Alphelinus mali, these aphids are preyed on by the bug Anthocoris nemoralis, ladybirds, hoverfly larvae and lacewings. The presence of earwigs Forficula auricularia on the trees can reduce the levels of aphid infestation, so encouraging these insects by providing shelters may be another means of biological control. Exclusion experiments in Poland showed that the earwigs, and to a lesser extent the seven-spot ladybird Coccinella septempunctata, were important in controlling the numbers of aphids later in the season; in the early spring the pine ladybird Exochomus quadripustulatus was the main predator on the aphids. The hoverflies Heringia calcarata and Eupeodes americana have also been used as effective biological control organisms. Areopraon lepelleyi is another species of wasp which is a parasitoid of the woolly apple aphid. In addition, entomopathogenic nematodes have been used to control root-dwelling populations of E. lanigerum.

Rootstocks have been developed which convey resistance to the aphids to the roots but they do not appear to be effective against aerial infestation. Growers have also tried to prevent infestation by preventing the crawler stage of the nymph from climbing into the crown, but these have proven ineffective as aphids can colonise the crown from neighbouring trees.

== Host plants ==
The host plants include apple, pear, Prunus spp, crab apple, Pyracantha, Cotoneaster, elm, hawthorn and mountain ash. It has also been known to attack Japanese quince Chaenomeles sp..

== Taxonomic issues ==
There is some debate about the host plant of E. lanigerum as the wooly aphids collected from Ulmus americana are now considered to be a separate species, Eriosoma herioti, which migrates from Ulmus americana onto similar species of plant which E. lanigerum has been recorded on.

Other specimens collected from elms and described as E. lingerum may have been misidentifications of the related Eriosoma crataegi or Eriosoma americanum, which some authority place in the Eriosoma lanigerum group.
