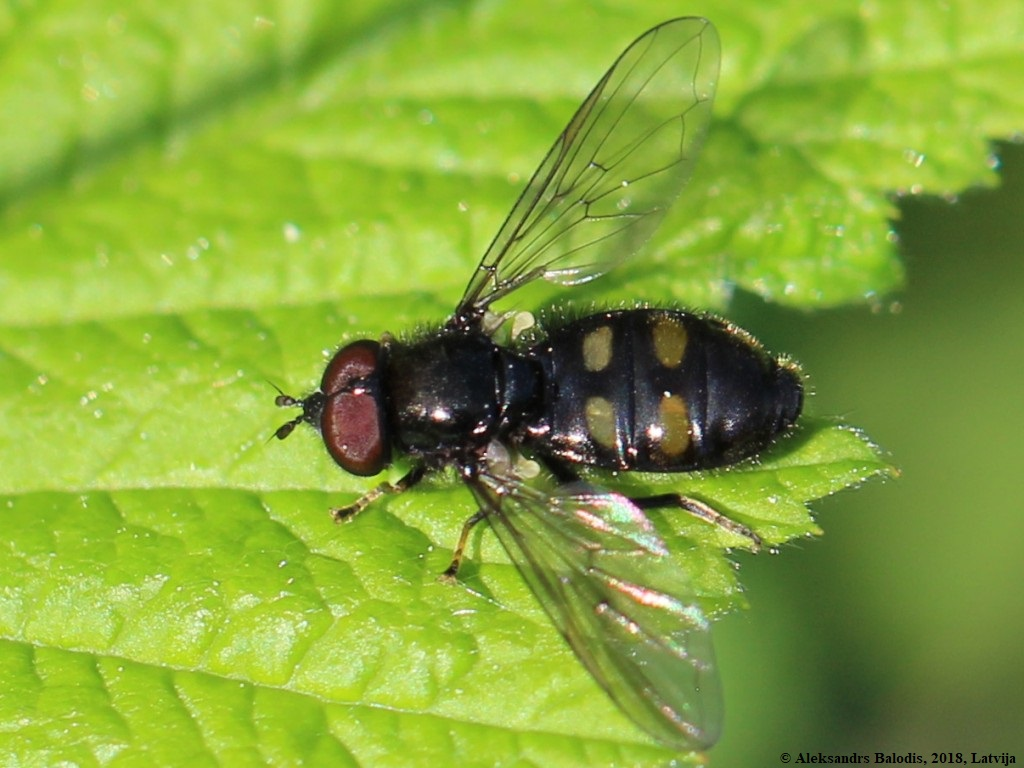

Scientific classification
- Kingdom: Animalia
- Phylum: Arthropoda
- Class: Insecta
- Order: Diptera
- Family: Syrphidae
- Genus: Pipiza
- Species: P. quadrimaculata

Binomial name
- Pipiza quadrimaculata (Panzer, 1804)

= Pipiza quadrimaculata =

Species of fly

Pipiza quadrimaculata is a species of hoverfly, from the family Syrphidae, in the order Diptera.
