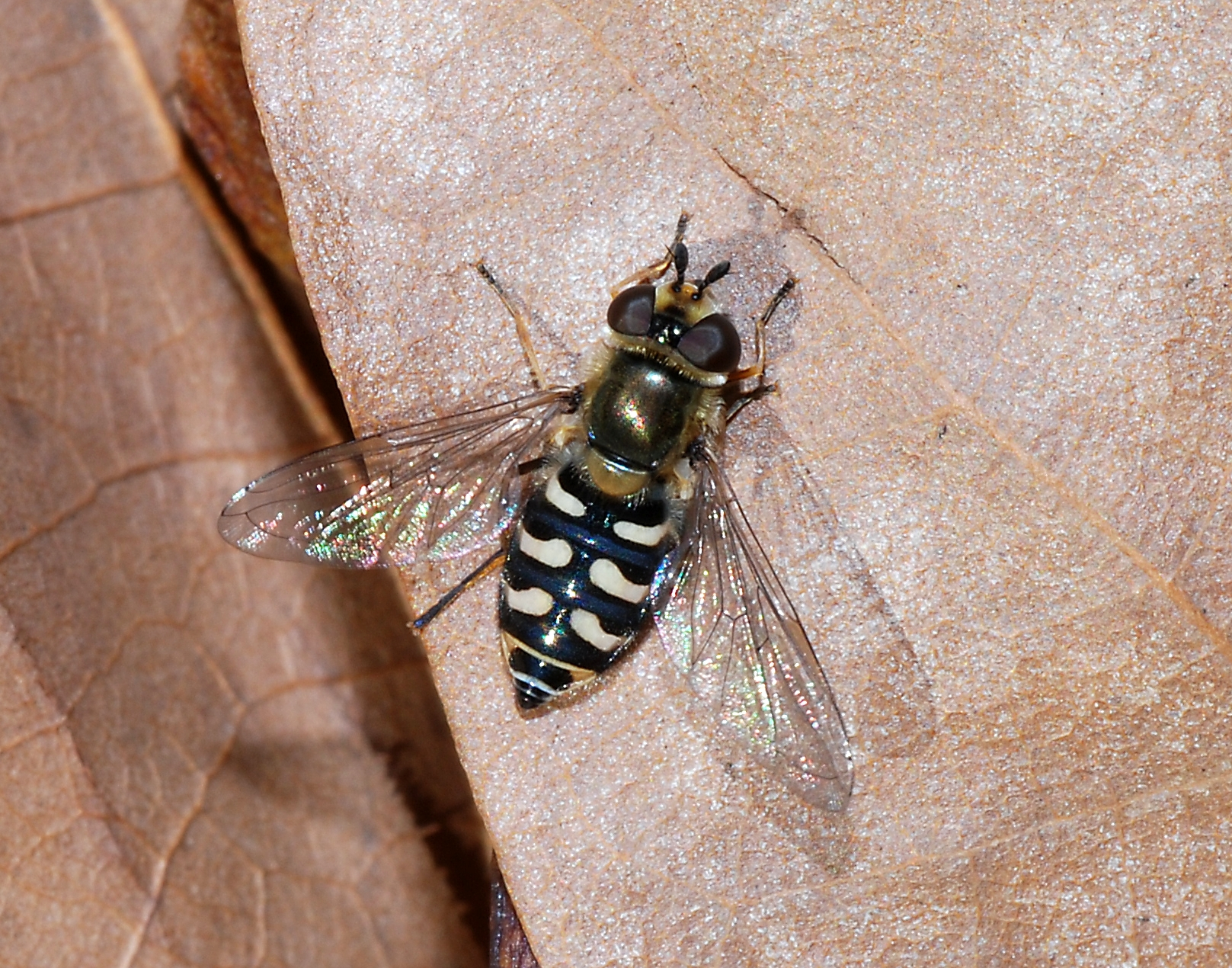
- Scaeva pyrastri

Scientific classification
- Kingdom: Animalia
- Phylum: Arthropoda
- Clade: Pancrustacea
- Class: Insecta
- Order: Diptera
- Section: Aschiza
- Superfamily: Syrphoidea

Families
- Syrphidae - hover and drone flies; Pipunculidae - big-headed flies

= Syrphoidea =

Superfamily of flies

The Syrphoidea are a superfamily of flies containing only two families under present classification, one of which (Syrphidae) has a great number of the most common and familiar flies. Molecular phylogenetic studies find Syrphoidea to be paraphyletic, with the family Pipunculidae as sister group to the Schizophora.
