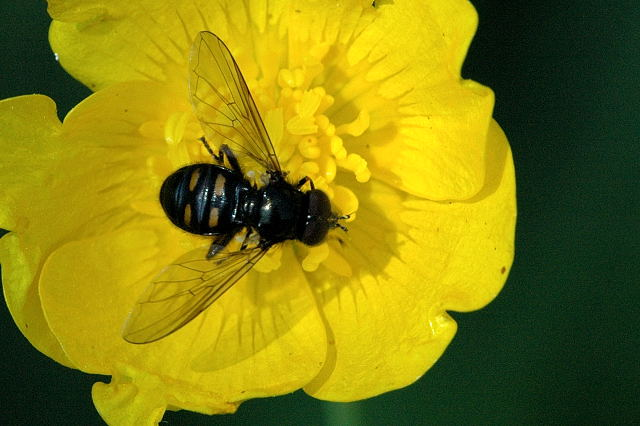
- P. quadrimaculata

Scientific classification
- Domain: Eukaryota
- Kingdom: Animalia
- Phylum: Arthropoda
- Class: Insecta
- Order: Diptera
- Family: Syrphidae
- Subfamily: Pipizinae; Williston, 1885

= Pipizinae =

Subfamily of flies

The Pipizinae is a subfamily of hoverflies. Pipizinae was formerly considered a tribe within Eristalinae, but a phylogenetic analysis published in 2015 suggested it should be ranked as a separate subfamily, sister to the Syrphinae.

Its members are small to medium-sized and generally black, although some species also have orange spots on their abdomen. The larvae feed on aphids, though they seem to have a preference for wax-secreting aphids, e.g. Pemphigidae.

== Genera ==
- Claussenia Vujić & Ståhls, 2013
- Cryptopipiza Mutin, 1998
- Heringia Rondani, 1856
- Neocnemodon Goffe, 1944
- †Oligopipiza Nidergas, Hadrava & Nel, 2018 (a fossil genus from Middle Oligocene ~28 MYR-BP)
- Pipiza Fallén, 1810
- Pipizella Rondani, 1856
- Trichopsomyia Williston, 1888
- Triglyphus Loew, 1840
