= Lebanaphididae =

Lebanaphididae Temporal range: Hauterivian–Barremian

Scientific classification
- Domain: Eukaryota
- Kingdom: Animalia
- Phylum: Arthropoda
- Class: Insecta
- Order: Hemiptera
- Suborder: Sternorrhyncha
- Infraorder: Aphidomorpha
- Superfamily: †Tajmyraphidoidea
- Family: †Lebanaphididae; Heie, 2000

Extinct family of true bugs

Lebanaphididae is an extinct family of aphids in the order Hemiptera. There are at least two genera in Lebanaphididae.

== Genera ==
These two genera belong to the family Lebanaphididae:

- † Lebanaphis Heie, 2000
- † Megarostrum Heie, 2000
