= Phylloxerina =

Scientific classification
- Kingdom: Animalia
- Phylum: Arthropoda
- Clade: Pancrustacea
- Class: Insecta
- Order: Hemiptera
- Suborder: Sternorrhyncha
- Family: Phylloxeridae
- Genus: Phylloxerina; Börner, 1908

Genus of true bugs

Phylloxerina is a genus of true bugs belonging to the family Phylloxeridae.

The species of this genus are found in Northern America.

Species:

- Phylloxerina capreae Börner, 1942
- Phylloxerina daphnoidis Iglisch, 1965
