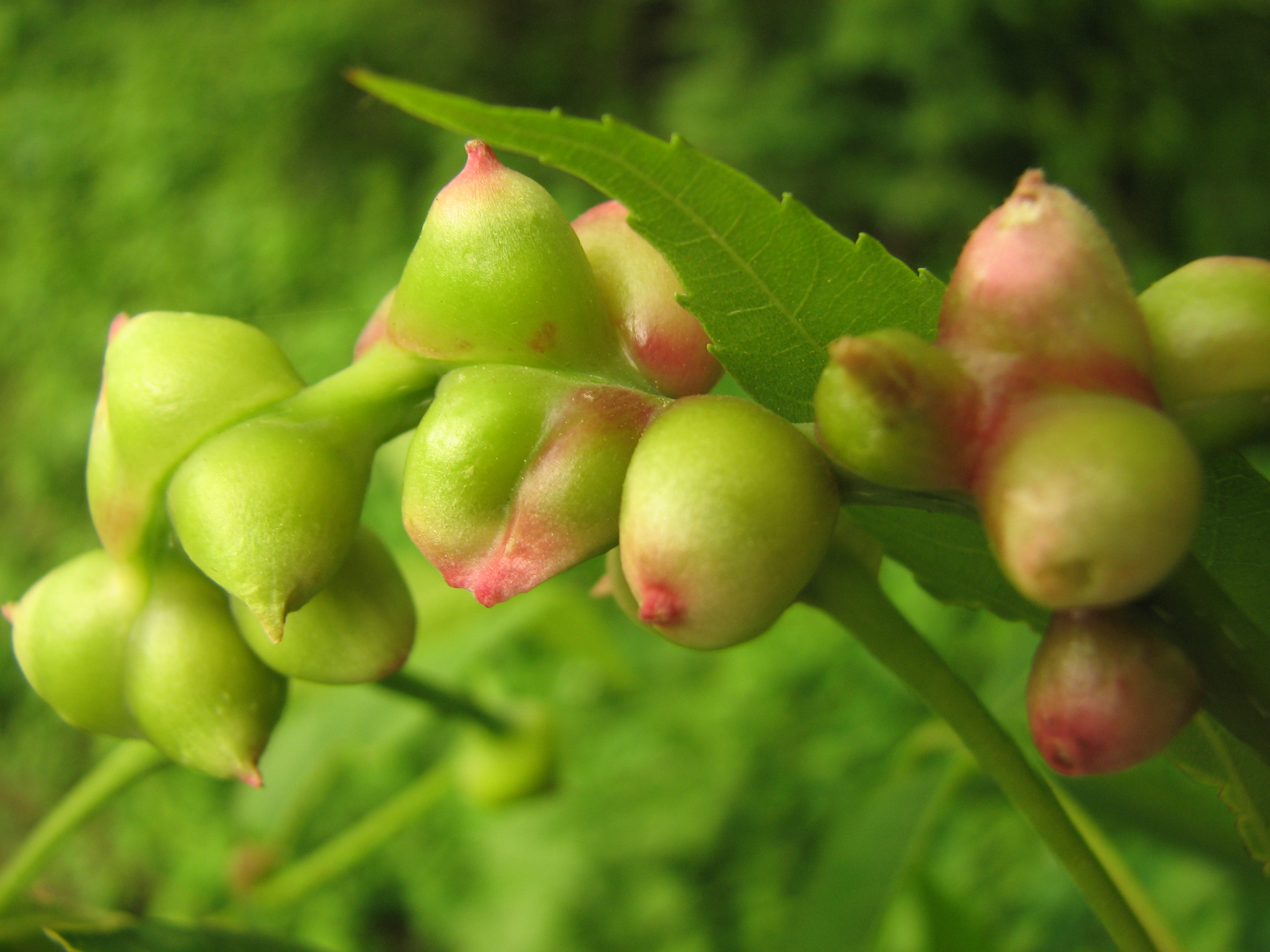
- Phylloxera perniciosa galls on Carya ovata

Scientific classification
- Domain: Eukaryota
- Kingdom: Animalia
- Phylum: Arthropoda
- Class: Insecta
- Order: Hemiptera
- Suborder: Sternorrhyncha
- Family: Phylloxeridae
- Genus: Phylloxera; Boyer de Fonscolombe, 1834

Synonyms
- Acanthaphis Del Guercio, 1908; Dactylosphaera Shimer, 1867; Euphylloxera Del Guercio, 1908; Micracanthaphis Grassi, 1912; Micranthaphis Eastop & Hille Ris Lambers, 1976; Moritziella Börner, 1908; Notabilia Mordvilko, 1909; Paramoritziella Grassi, 1912; Parapergandea Börner, 1930; Paraphylloxera Grassi, 1912; Philloxera Boyer de Fonscolombe, 1834; Phylloptera de Horváth, 1896; Phylloxeroides Grassi, 1912; Phylotexera Blanchard, 1840; Phyloxera Kaltenbach, 1867; Phyloxera Rondani, 1848; Psylloptera Ferrari, 1872; Rhanis von Heyden, 1837; Troitzkya Börner, 1930; Vaccuna Lichtenstein, 1877; Vacuna von Heyden, 1837; Xerophylla Walsh, 1867

= Phylloxera (genus) =

Genus of true bugs

Phylloxera is a genus of true bugs belonging to the family Phylloxeridae.

The species of this genus are found in Europe and Northern America.

Species:

- Phylloxera caryaeavellana C.V.Riley, 1880
- Phylloxera caryaecaulis (Fitch, 1855)
- Phylloxera caryaefallax C.V.Riley, 1874
- Phylloxera caryaefoliae Fitch, 1856
- Phylloxera caryaeglobuli Walsh, 1863
- Phylloxera caryaegummosa C.V.Riley, 1874
- Phylloxera caryaeren C.V.Riley, 1874
- Phylloxera caryaescissa C.V.Riley, 1880
- Phylloxera caryaesemen (Shimer, 1869)
- Phylloxera caryaesepta (Shimer, 1869)
- Phylloxera caryaevenae (Fitch, 1856)
- Phylloxera castaneae (Haldeman, 1850)
- Phylloxera castaneivora (Miyazaki, 1968)
- Phylloxera coccinea (von Heyden, 1837)
- Phylloxera confusa (Grassi, 1912)
- Phylloxera conica (Shimer, 1869)
- Phylloxera corticalis Kaltenbach, 1867
- Phylloxera davidsoni Duncan, 1922
- Phylloxera deplanata Pergande, 1904
- Phylloxera depressa (Shimer, 1869)
- Phylloxera devastatrix Pergande, 1904
- Phylloxera foae Börner, 1909
- Phylloxera foveata (Shimer, 1869)
- Phylloxera foveola Pergande, 1904
- Phylloxera georgiana Pergande, 1904
- Phylloxera glabra (von Heyden, 1837)
- Phylloxera globosa (Shimer, 1867)
- Phylloxera ilicis (Grassi, 1912)
- Phylloxera intermedia Pergande, 1904
- Phylloxera italica (Grassi, 1912)
- Phylloxera kunugi Shinji, 1943
- Phylloxera minima (Shimer, 1869)
- Phylloxera notabilis Pergande, 1904
- Phylloxera perniciosa Pergande, 1904
- Phylloxera picta Pergande, 1904
- Phylloxera pilosula Pergande, 1904
- Phylloxera querceti Pergande, 1904
- Phylloxera quercina (Ferrari, 1872)
- Phylloxera quercus Boyer de Fonscolombe, 1834
- Phylloxera reticulata Duncan, 1922
- Phylloxera rileyi C.V.Riley, 1874
- Phylloxera rimosalis Pergande, 1904
- Phylloxera russellae Stoetzel, 1981
- Phylloxera similans Duncan, 1922
- Phylloxera spinifera Pergande, 1904
- Phylloxera spinosa (Shimer, 1869)
- Phylloxera spinuloides Pergande, 1904
- Phylloxera stanfordiana Ferris, 1919
- Phylloxera stellata Duncan, 1922
- Phylloxera subelliptica (Shimer, 1869)
- Phylloxera symmetrica Pergande, 1904
- Phylloxera texana Stoetzel, 1981
- Phylloxera tuberculifera Duncan, 1922
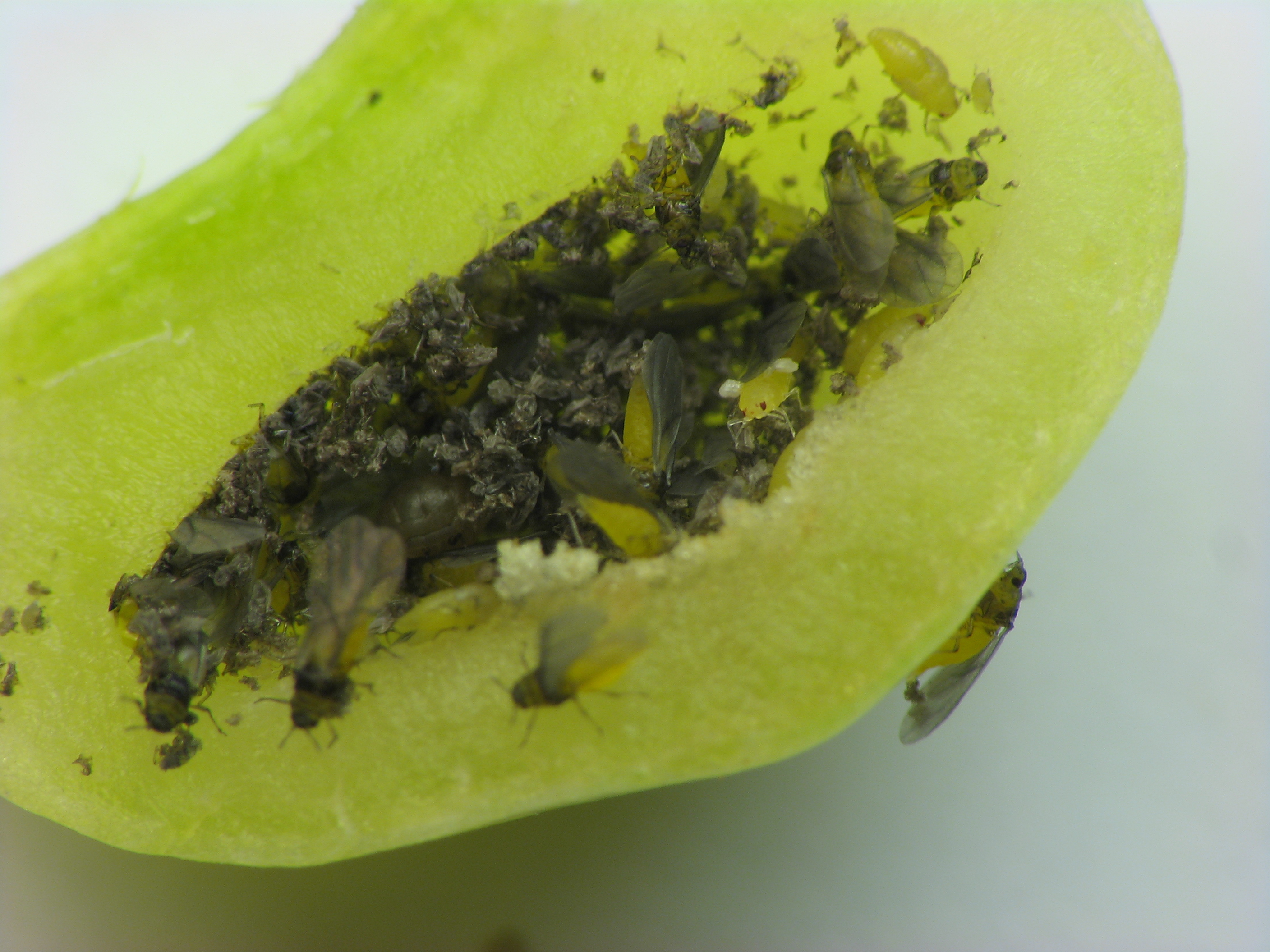
Adults, immatures inside a Phylloxera perniciosa gall

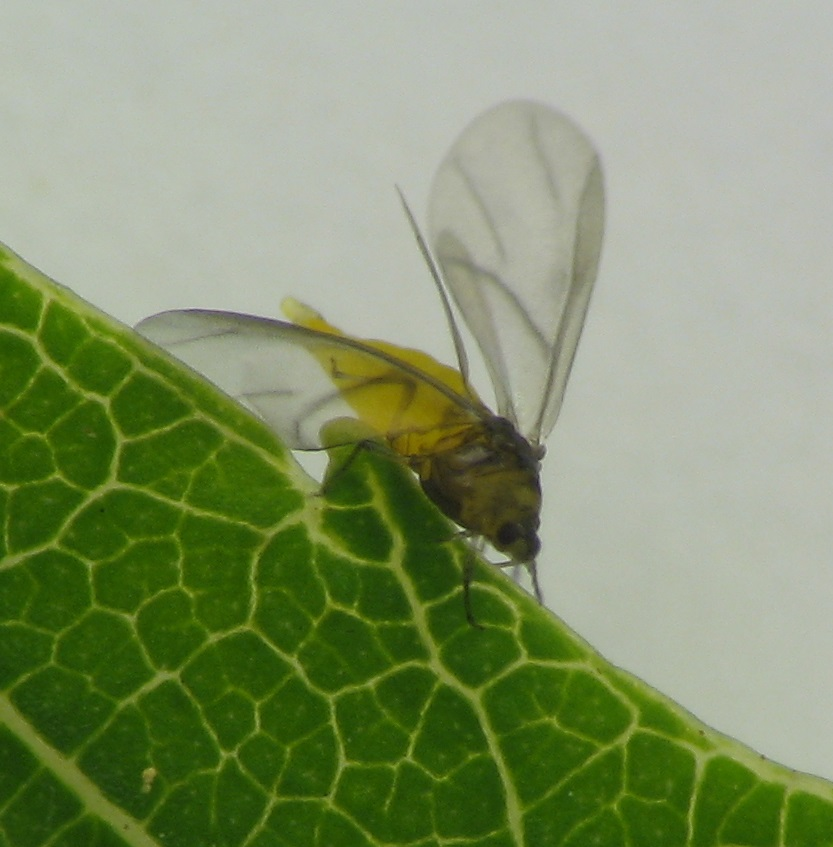
Phylloxera perniciosa, winged adult found on Carya
