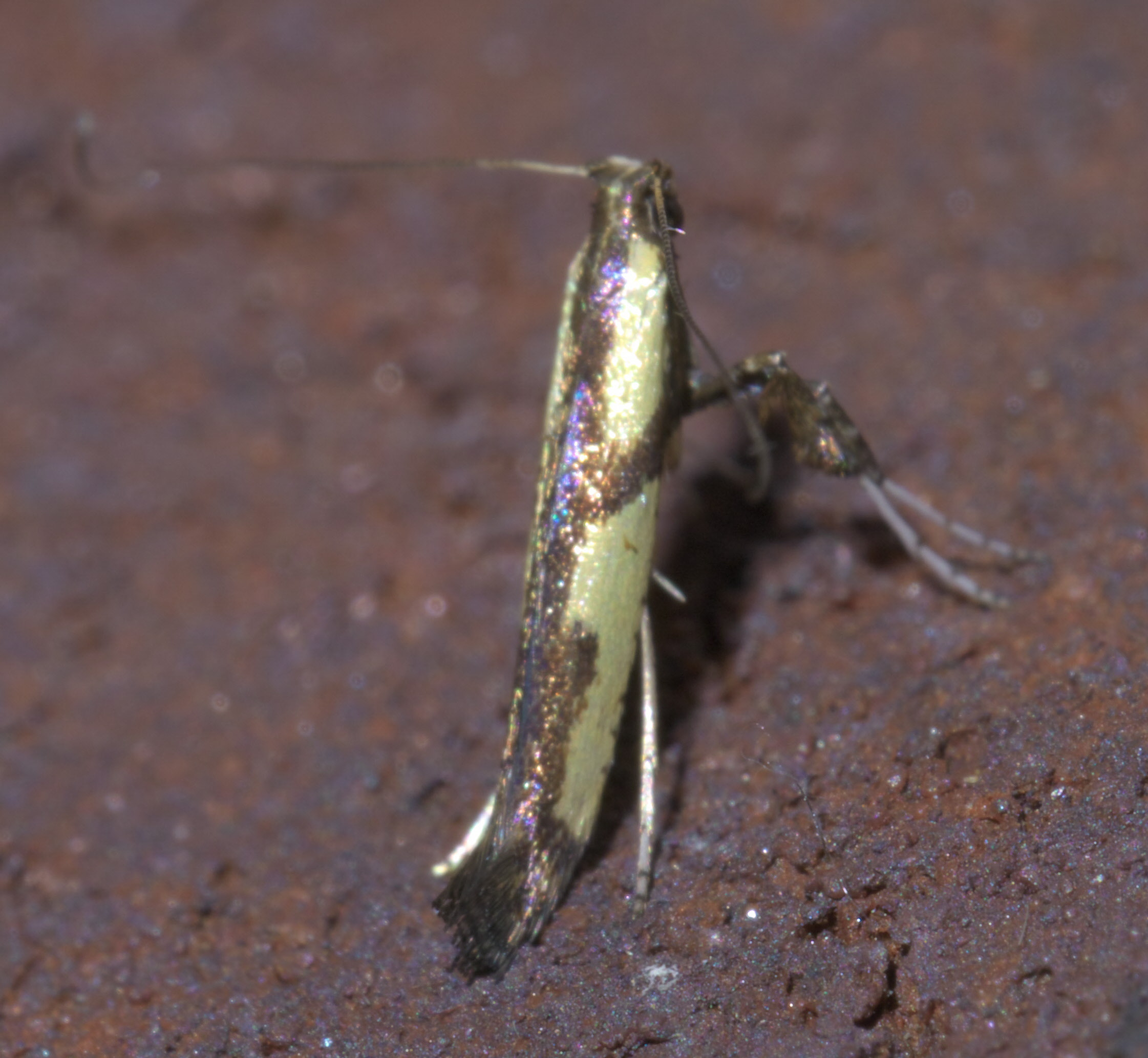

Scientific classification
- Kingdom: Animalia
- Phylum: Arthropoda
- Clade: Pancrustacea
- Class: Insecta
- Order: Lepidoptera
- Family: Gracillariidae
- Genus: Caloptilia
- Species: C. blandella

Binomial name
- Caloptilia blandella (Clemens, 1864)

Synonyms
- Caloptilia juglandivorella (Chambers, 1873)

= Caloptilia blandella =

Species of moth

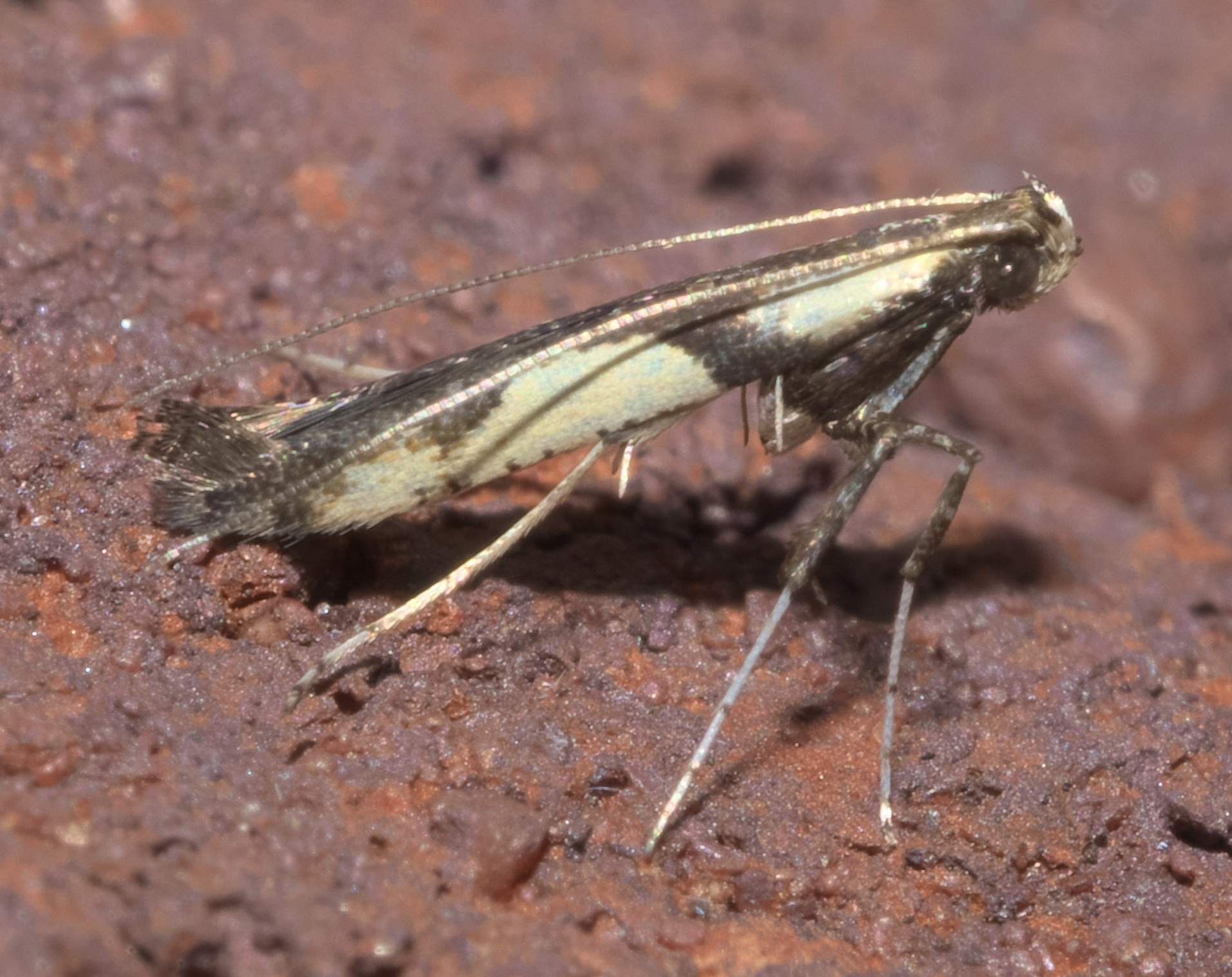
Caloptilia blandella, walnut caloptilia, Size: 5.4 mm

Caloptilia blandella is a moth of the family Gracillariidae. It is known in Canada (Québec) and the United States (including Pennsylvania, Virginia, Maine, Maryland, Texas, and Kentucky).

The wingspan is about 9 millimetres (0.35 in).

The larvae feed on Carya ovata and Juglans nigra. They mine the leaves of their host plant.
