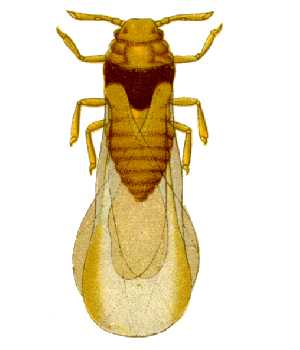
- Daktulosphaira vitifoliae

Scientific classification
- Kingdom: Animalia
- Phylum: Arthropoda
- Clade: Pancrustacea
- Class: Insecta
- Order: Hemiptera
- Suborder: Sternorrhyncha
- Infraorder: Aphidomorpha
- Superfamily: Phylloxeroidea
- Family: Phylloxeridae; Herrich-Schaeffer, 1854

Genera
- Acanthochermes Kollar, 1848; Aphanostigma Börner, 1909; Daktulosphaira Shimer, 1866; Foaiella Börner, 1909; Olegia Shaposhnikov, 1979; Phylloxera Boyer de Fonscolombe, 1834; Phylloxerina Börner, 1908; † Palaeophylloxera Heie & Peñalver, 1999

= Phylloxeridae =

Phylloxeridae Temporal range: Eocene–Present

Family of true bugs

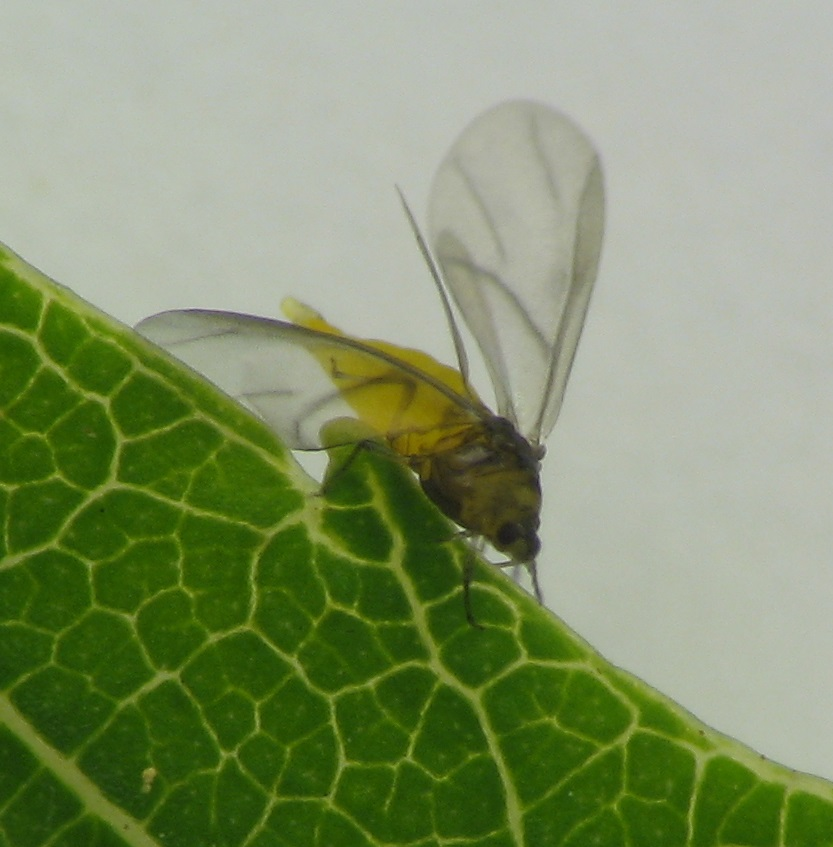
Phylloxera perniciosa winged adult

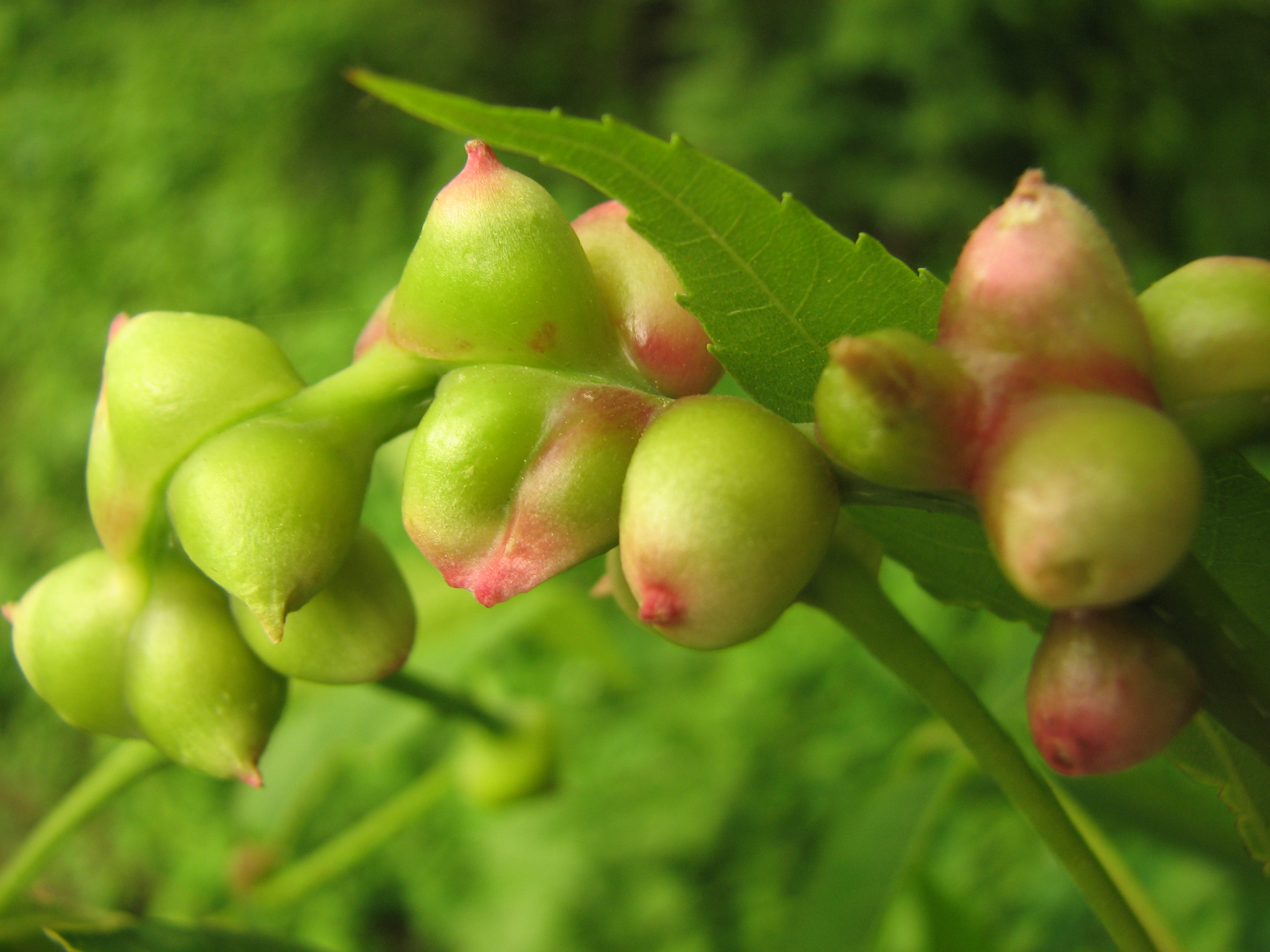
Galls made by Phylloxera perniciosa on hickory (Carya)

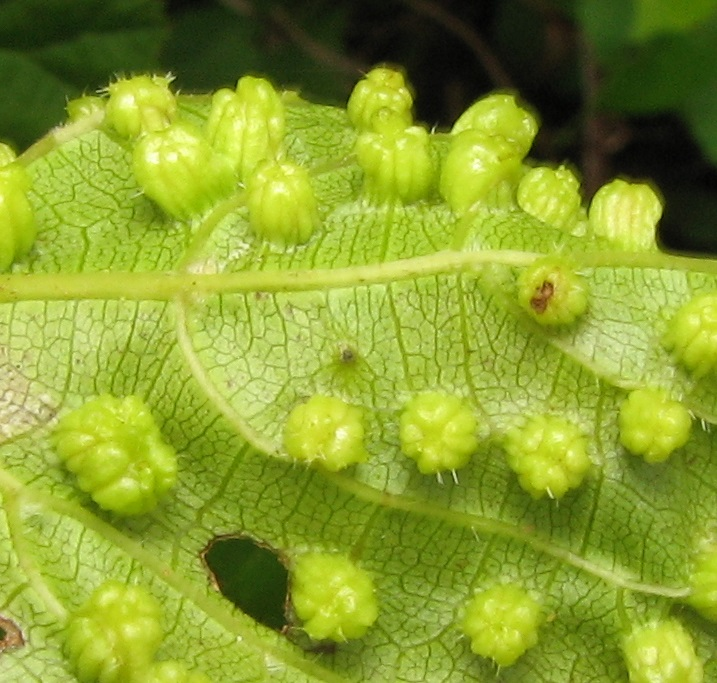
Galls made by Daktulosphaira vitifoliae on leaf of Vitis sp.

Phylloxeridae is a small family of plant-parasitic hemipterans closely related to aphids with only 75 described species. This group comprises two subfamilies (Phylloxerininae and Phylloxerinae) and 11 genera with one that is fossil. The genus type is Phylloxera. The Phylloxeridae species are usually called phylloxerans or phylloxerids.

== History and distribution ==
The first record of species of the family was in Aphidoidea by Latreille, 1802. In 1857 Herrich-Schaeffer described the family and named this group 'Phylloxeriden'. Lichtenstein was the first to use the word 'Phylloxeridae' in 1883. They have a worldwide distribution but seem to have originated from a moderate climate since they are more diverse in temperate climates and their adaptation to tropical life probably is of a secondary nature.

== Behavior and ecology ==
Phylloxerans are aphid-like insects that are parasitic hemipterans on deciduous trees and perennial fruit crops. They feed on leaves and roots and are cecidogenic, which means they induce galls to form. They have very complex life cycles with cyclical parthenogenesis and host alternation. In outline, a female fundatrix hatches from an overwintering egg on the primary host which is usually a woody plant before bud burst stimulating a gall to form on the young leaves. Winged offspring in the following or third generation migrate in spring to the secondary host (usually an herbaceous). Then, many winged and wingless generations may be produced on the secondary host before winged migrants return to the primary host in autumn. Males and mating females mate on the winter host and produce overwintering eggs.

In the family Phylloxeridae, some species are holocyclic (meaning they produce both asexual and sexual generations) while some are anholocyclic (producing only asexual generations). Species of this family live within the galls on the host plants and also in the crevices of barks.

== Economic importance ==
The best-studied member of the family is the economically important grape phylloxeran, Daktulosphaira vitifoliae, which devastated European vineyards in the late 19th century after it was inadvertently imported from North America. Today, as a result, nearly all commercial wine grapes (Vitis vinifera) are grafted on to non-vinifera North American rootstock, which is resistant to the pathogen.

== Morphology ==
The phylloxeran species are very small to minute insects. Besides, there is a high polymorphism in the family Phylloxeridae making it at times difficult to identify its members. Also, they can quite easily be confused with related insects such as adelgids and true aphids. The most important features used to tell them apart from their relatives and from other insects are the wings' venation, the ovipositor and some characteristics of their antennae. Phylloxerans have a three-segmented antenna in all forms (both adults and immature). The wings are held flat over the body at rest and the Cu1 and Cu2 of the front wings are stalked at the base. The flagellum always ends in a sensorium (or rhinaria) and adult females can have one or two additional sensorial on the flagellum. Egg laying females and males have vestigial mouthparts and are wingless. Concerning the immature, the nymphs resemble adults but never have the secondary sensorium. Also the immature of the sexuales have a unique non-feeding pupiform larva. Phylloxerans can be distinguished from adelgids by the fact that they have a vulva instead of a sclerotized ovipositor, and usually lack the wax glands or plates found in adelgids. They can also be distinguished from aphids because they have 3 veins while aphids have 4-6 veins.

== Taxonomy/phylogeny ==
Phylloxeridae is part of the order Hemiptera and suborder Sternorrhyncha. But there is a lot of controversy when it comes to its position and phylogeny within this lineage, especially in regard to its relatives namely the adelgids (Adelgidae) and aphids (Aphididae). The following quote is an illustration: "Almost as many classifications of aphids have been proposed as there have been practicing taxonomists". "Aphids" here include Adelgidae, Aphididae and Phylloxeridae. In the past these three families mentioned above have been placed together in the same superfamily Aphidoidea.

Generally, Phylloxeridae is placed together with Adelgidae in the superfamily Phylloxeroidea. In fact, bionomical similarity such as the oviparous parthenogenetic females observed in these two groups and morphological characters (e.g. reduction of forewing venation, reduction of antennal segments) have been used in the study of their phylogeny, suggesting that they are closely related and leading to their placing as sister groups in Phylloxeroidea. Phylloxeridae together with Adelgidae form the oviparous aphids group which is monophyletic and is the sister group to Aphidoidea (other aphids).

However, more recent studies using both morphological and molecular data to discuss the phylogeny and evolutionary history within Sternorrhyncha suggest that representatives of Adelgidae, Aphididae and Phylloxeridae have evolved independently and should not be combined in superfamilies. The debate is still open and more research is needed to clear up the Sternorrhyncha phylogeny.
