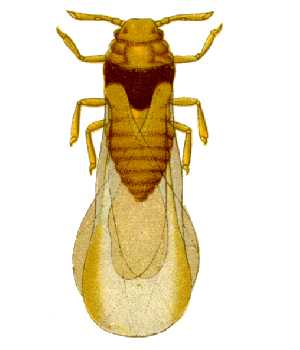
- Daktulosphaira vitifoliae

Scientific classification
- Domain: Eukaryota
- Kingdom: Animalia
- Phylum: Arthropoda
- Class: Insecta
- Order: Hemiptera
- Suborder: Sternorrhyncha
- Infraorder: Aphidomorpha
- Superfamily: Phylloxeroidea; Herrich-Schaeffer, 1854

Families
- Adelgidae; Phylloxeridae

= Phylloxeroidea =

Superfamily of true bugs

The Phylloxeroidea is a small superfamily of the Hemiptera within the infraorder Aphidomorpha which is closely related to the aphids which are traditionally included in the Aphidoidea, which is the sister taxon. The two extant families are the pine and spruce aphids (Adelgidae, including the former family Chermesidae, or "Chermidae") and the phylloxerans (Phylloxeridae), including vine phylloxera, a serious pest of grapevines.
