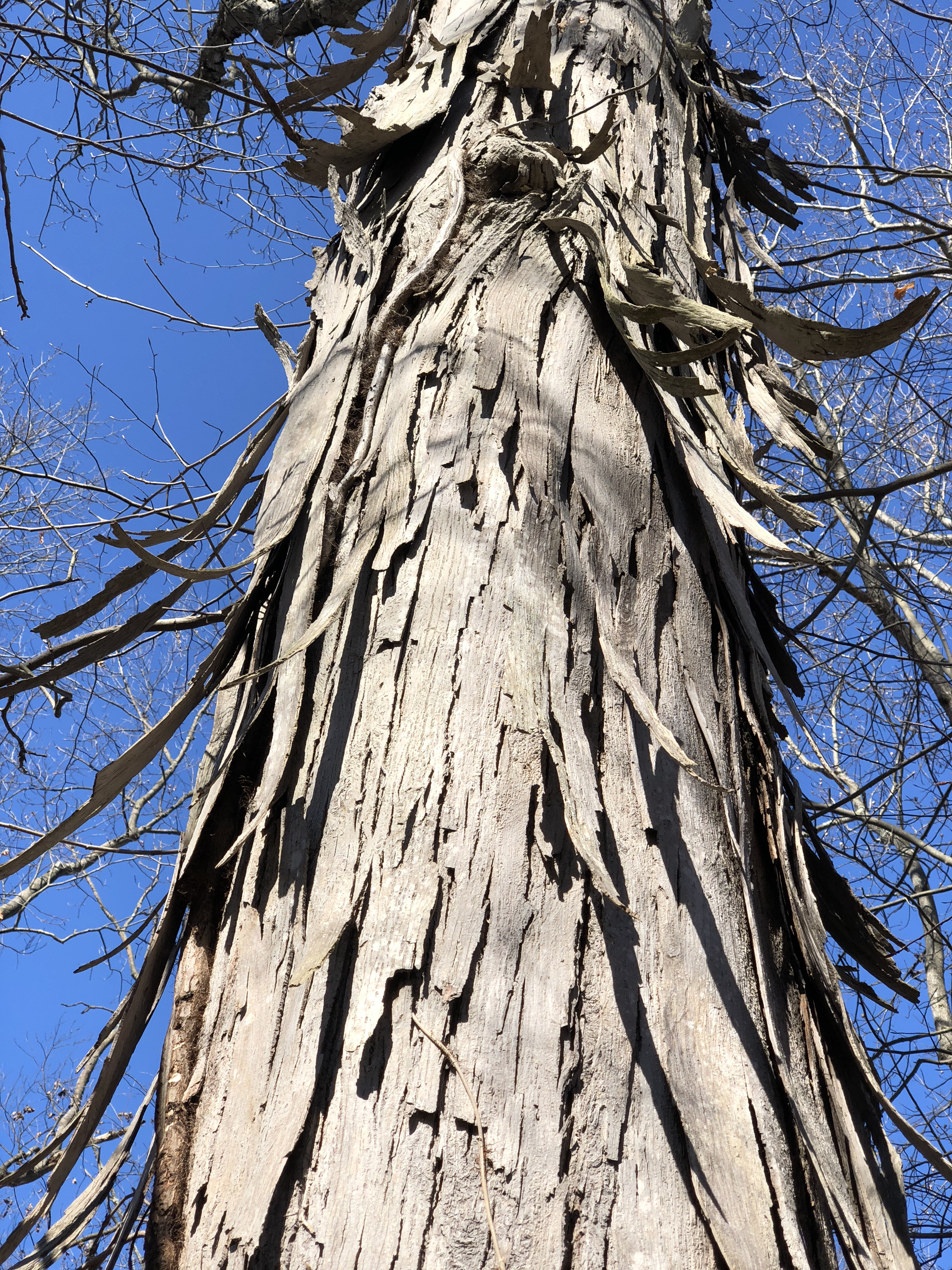

Conservation status
- Least Concern (IUCN 3.1)

- Secure (NatureServe)

Scientific classification
- Kingdom: Plantae
- Clade: Tracheophytes
- Clade: Angiosperms
- Clade: Eudicots
- Clade: Rosids
- Order: Fagales
- Family: Juglandaceae
- Genus: Carya
- Section: Carya sect. Carya
- Species: C. ovata

Binomial name
- Carya ovata (Mill.) K.Koch

Subspecies
- Carya ovata var. australis (Ashe) Little; Carya ovata var. mexicana (Engelm. ex Hemsl.) W.E.Manning; Carya ovata var. ovata
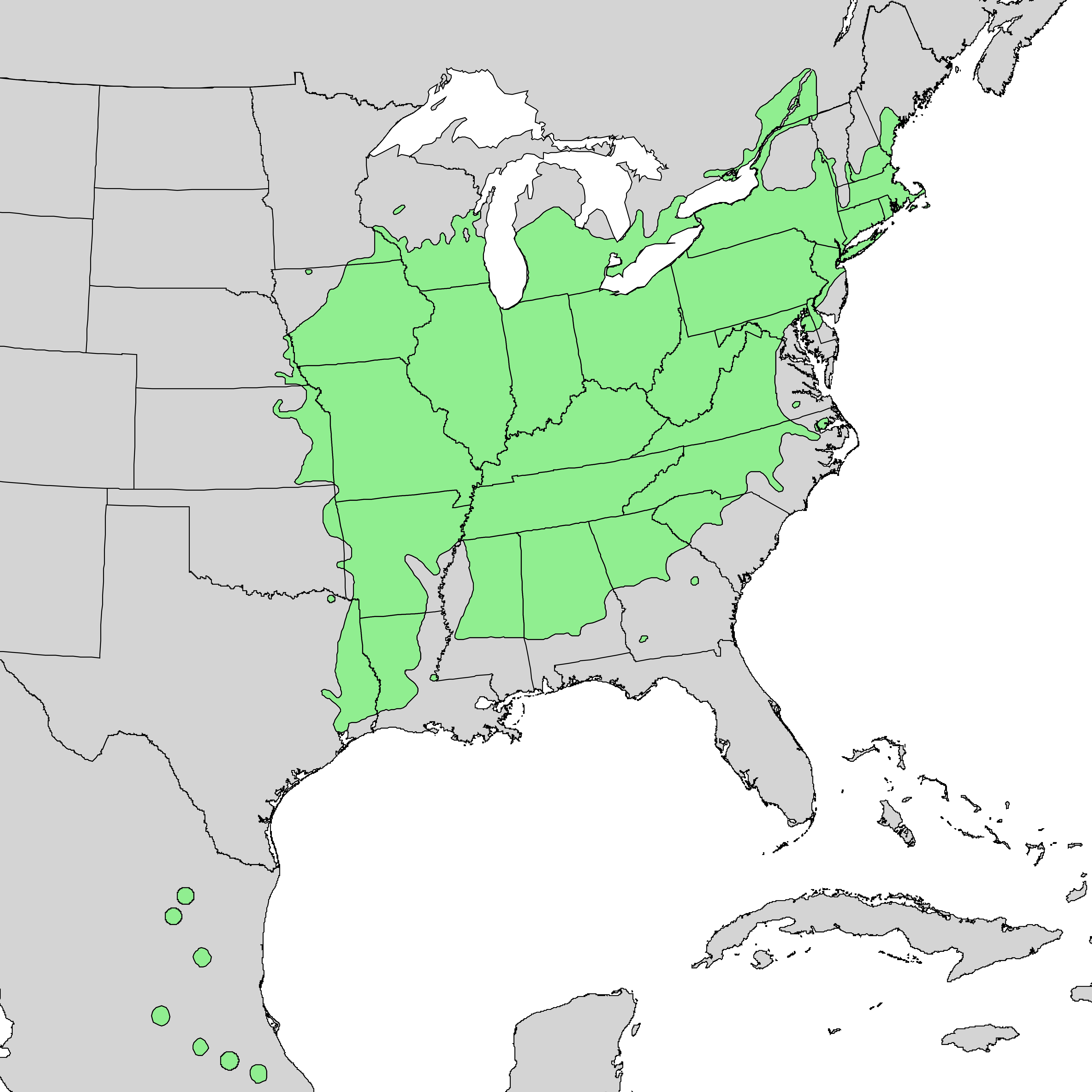
- Natural range of Carya ovata

Synonyms
- Carya alba subsp. ovata (Mill.) Schwer.; Hicorius ovata (Mill.) Britton; Juglans alba var. ovata (Mill.) Castigl.; Juglans alba ovata (Mill.) Marshall; Juglans squamosa F.Michx.; Juglans ovata Mill.; Scoria ovata (Mill.) MacMill.

= Carya ovata =

Shagbark hickory

Species of tree

Carya ovata, the shagbark hickory, is a common hickory native to eastern North America, with two varieties. The trees can grow to quite a large size but are unreliable in their fruit output. The nut is consumed by wildlife and historically by Native Americans, who also used the wood.

== Name ==
The word hickory is an aphetic form from earlier pohickory, short for even earlier pokahickory, borrowed from the Virginia Algonquian word pawcohiccora, hickory-nut meat or a nut milk drink made from it. Other names for this tree are Carolina Hickory, Scalybark Hickory, Upland Hickory, and Shellbark Hickory, with older binomial names of Carya ovata var. fraxinifolia, Carya ovata var. nuttallii, Carya ovata var. pubescens, Hicoria alba, Hicoria borealis, and Hicoria ovata.

== Description ==
It is a large, deciduous tree, growing well over 100 ft (30 m) tall, and can live more than 350 years. The tallest measured shagbark, located in Savage Gulf, Tennessee, is over 150 ft (46 m) tall. Mature shagbarks are easy to recognize because, as their name implies, they have shaggy bark. This characteristic is, however, only found on mature trees; young specimens have smooth bark.

The leaves are 30–60 cm (12–24 in) long, pinnate, with five (rarely three or seven) leaflets, the terminal three leaflets much larger than the basal pair. The shagbark hickory is monoecious. Staminate flowers are borne on long-stalked catkins at the tip of old wood or in the axils of the previous season's leaves. Pistillate flowers occur in short terminal spikes. The fruit is a drupe 2.5 to 4 cm (1 to 1 1/2 in) long, an edible nut with a hard, bony shell, contained in a thick, green four-sectioned husk which turns dark and splits off at maturity in the fall. The terminal buds on the shagbark hickory are large and covered with loose scales.

C. ovata begins producing seeds at about 10 years of age, but large quantities are not produced until 40 years and will continue for at least 100. Nut production is erratic, with good crops every 3 to 5 years, in between which few or none appear and the entire crop may be lost to animal predation.

== Taxonomy ==
The two varieties are:

- Carya ovata var. ovata (northern shagbark hickory) has its largest leaflets over 20 cm (8 in) long and nuts 3–4 cm (1 1/8–1 5/8 in) long.
- Carya ovata var. australis (southern shagbark hickory or Carolina hickory) has its largest leaflets under 20 cm (8 in) long and nuts 2–3 cm (3/4–1 1/8 in) long.

Some sources regard southern shagbark hickory as the separate species Carya carolinae-septentrionalis.

== Distribution ==
Shagbark hickory is found throughout most of the eastern United States, but it is largely absent from the southeastern and Gulf Coastal Plains and lower Mississippi Delta areas. An isolated population grows in eastern Canada as far north as Lavant Township, Canadian zone 4b. Scattered locations of shagbark hickory occur in the Sierra Madre Oriental of eastern Mexico.

Shagbark hickory was introduced in Europe in the 17th century. It can still be found in Central Europe as a non-native species. The native geographical range is one of the widest among Hickory species, although the species is less prevalent now due to selective harvesting for wood.

== Ecology ==
Red squirrels, gray squirrels, raccoons, chipmunks, and mice are consumers of hickory nuts. Other consumers include black bears, gray and red foxes, rabbits, and bird species such as mallards, wood ducks, bobwhites, and wild turkey.

== Uses ==
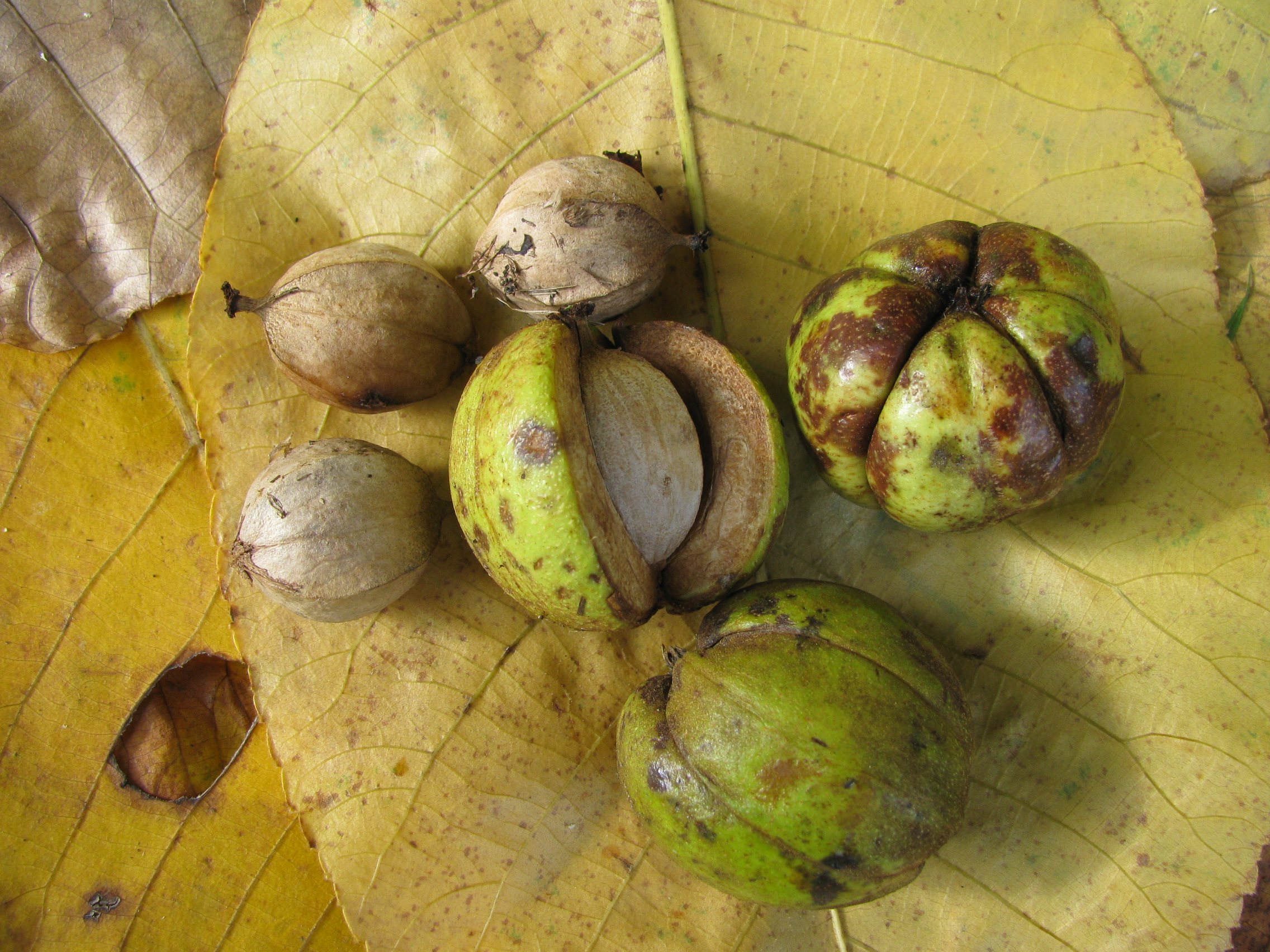
Carya ovata fruit

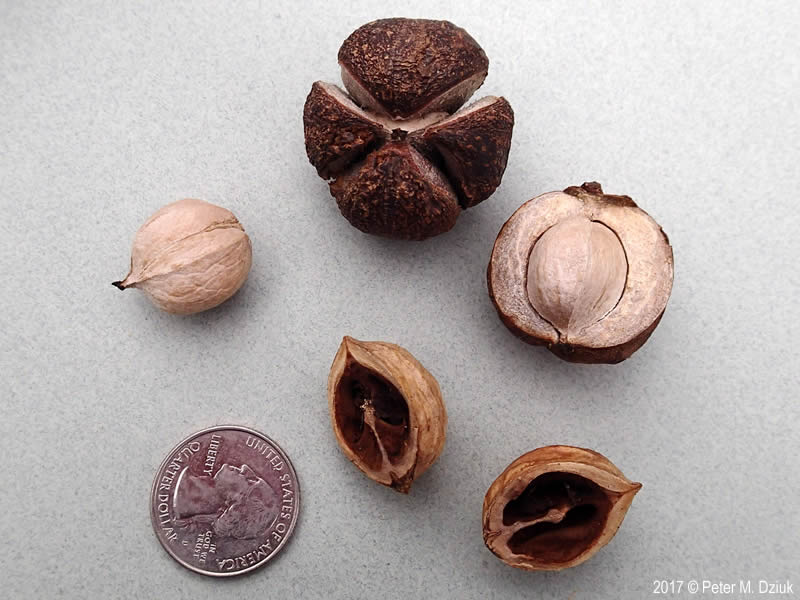
Mature fruit

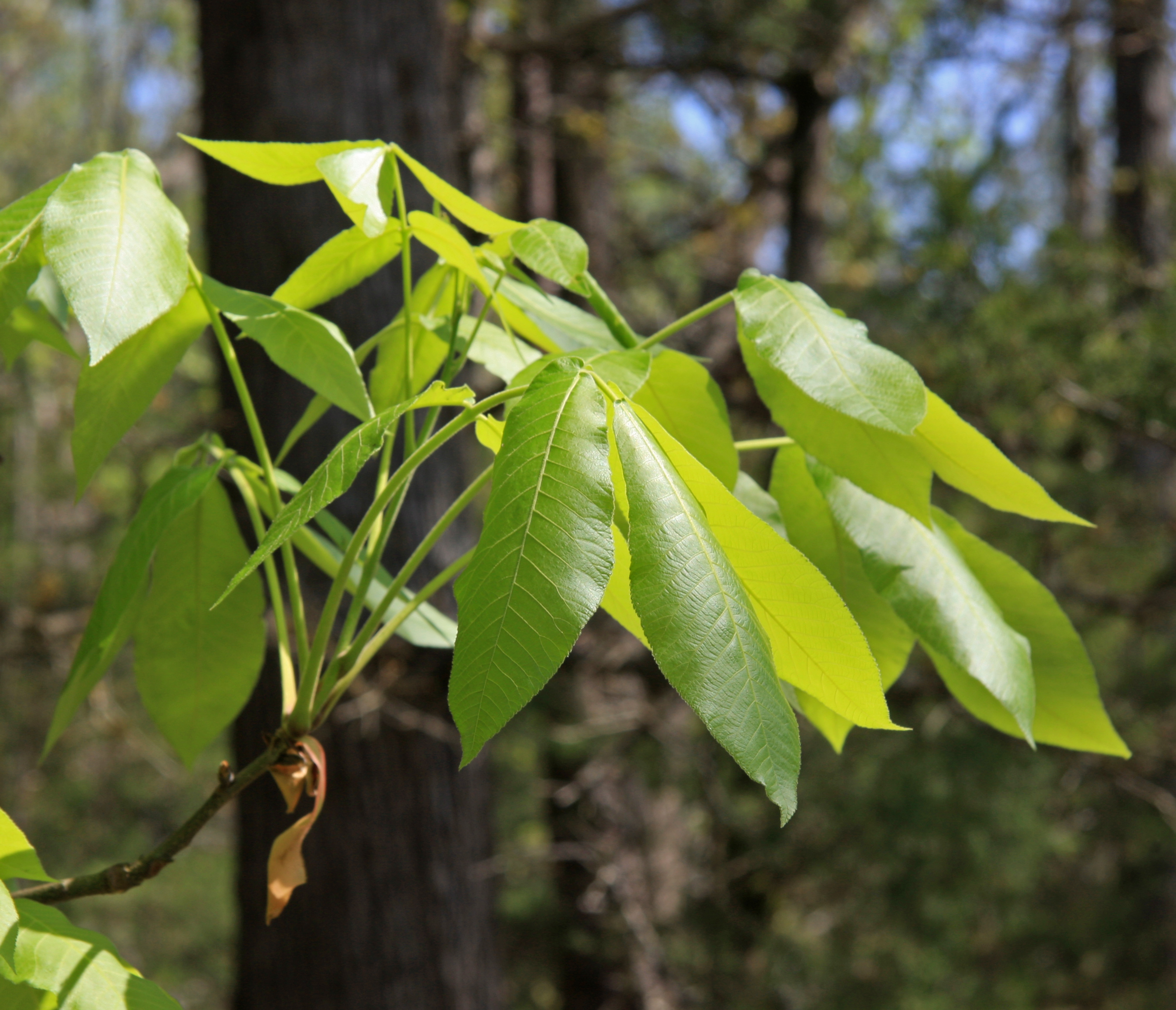
Carya ovata spring leaf cluster

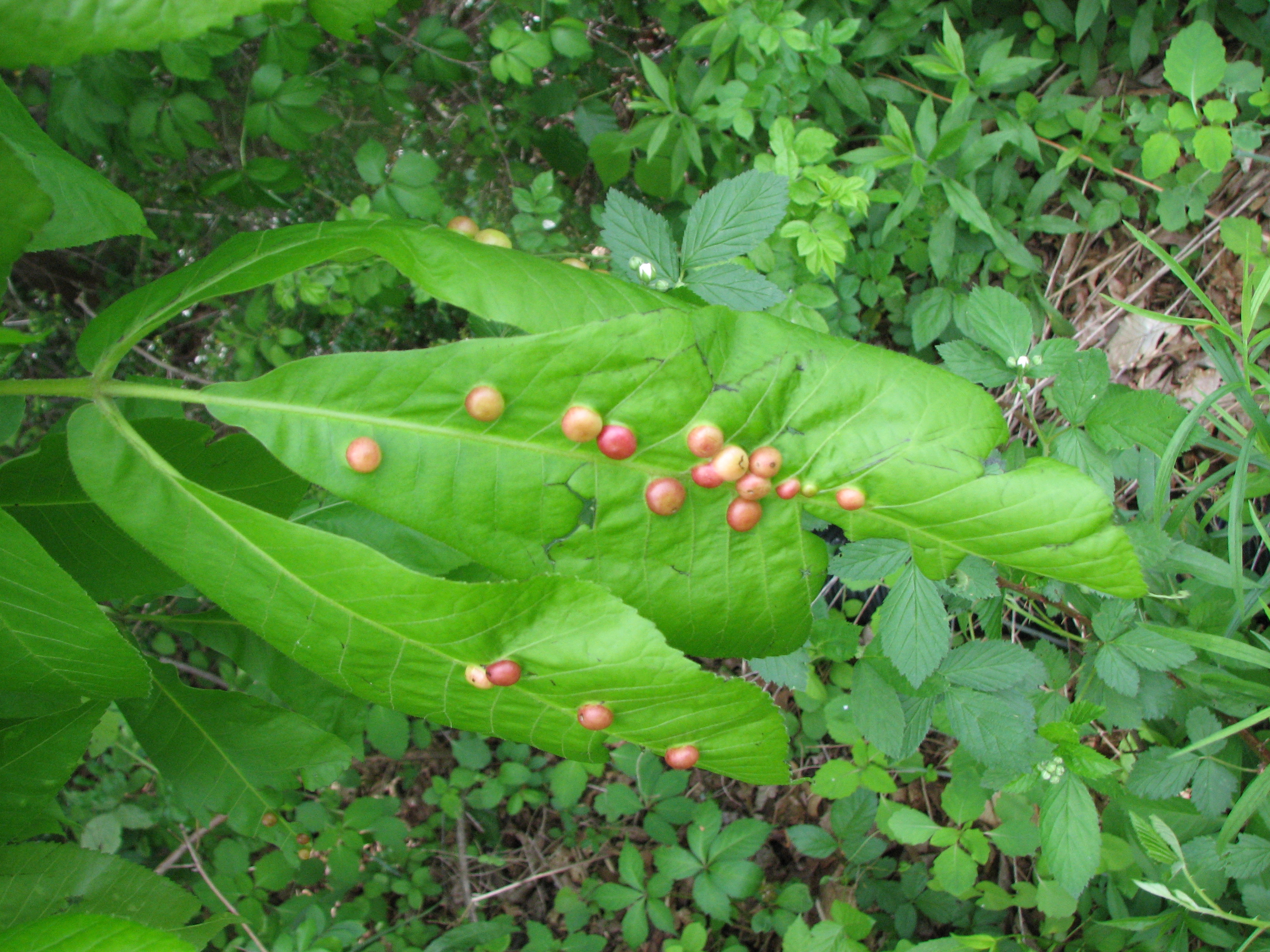
Phylloxera caryaeglobuli galls on C. ovata leaves

The nuts are edible with an excellent flavor. They are unsuitable for commercial or orchard production due to the long time it takes for a tree to produce sizable crops and unpredictable output from year to year. The nuts can be used as a substitute for the pecan in colder climates and have nearly the same culinary function. The bark is also used to flavor a maple-style syrup.

Shagbark hickory nuts were an important staple of indigenous diet. Excavation of an ancient (ca. 4350–4050 cal BP) site at Victor Mills in Columbia County, Georgia found hickory nuts, processing tools and other artifacts indicating large-scale processing and storage of nuts. Native Americans used the kernel milk to make corn cakes, kanuchi and hominy. The nuts were a significant food source for the Algonquins. Shagbark hickory wood is used for smoking meat and for making the bows of Native Americans of the northern area. The lumber is heavy, hard, and tough, weighing 63 lb/ cu ft when air-dried, and has been employed for implements and tools that require strength. These include axles, axe handles, ploughs, skis, and drum sticks.

== In culture ==
Andrew Jackson, the seventh president of the United States, was popularly nicknamed Old Hickory, a play on the toughness of hickory wood. In 1830, he began planning the construction of his tomb at The Hermitage, his plantation in Tennessee. The grave site was surrounded by a variety of trees, including six shagbark hickories. They stood there for 168 years until a storm in 1998 demolished over 1,200 trees at the site. Work on replanting them remains an ongoing project. In modern times, shagbark hickory is rarely used as an ornamental due to its large size, slow growth, difficulty of transplanting (all Juglandaceae species have large taproots) and nut litter.

== Genetics ==
Shagbark hickory hybridizes with pecan, Carya illinoinensis, and shellbark hickory, C. laciniosa (C. x dunbarii Sarg.). Shagbark hickory has 32 chromosomes. In general, species within the genus with the same chromosome number are able to cross. Numerous hybrids among the Carya species with 32 chromosomes (pecan, bitternut, shellbark, and shagbark) have been described, though most are unproductive or have other flaws. A few hican varieties are commercially propagated.

== Gallery ==
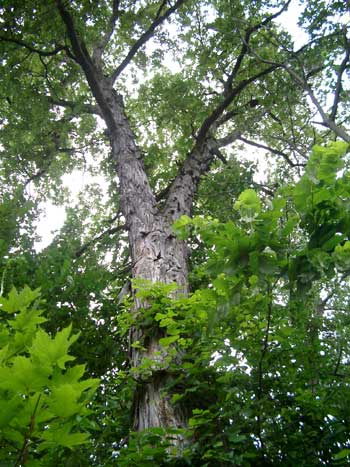
Tree in forest

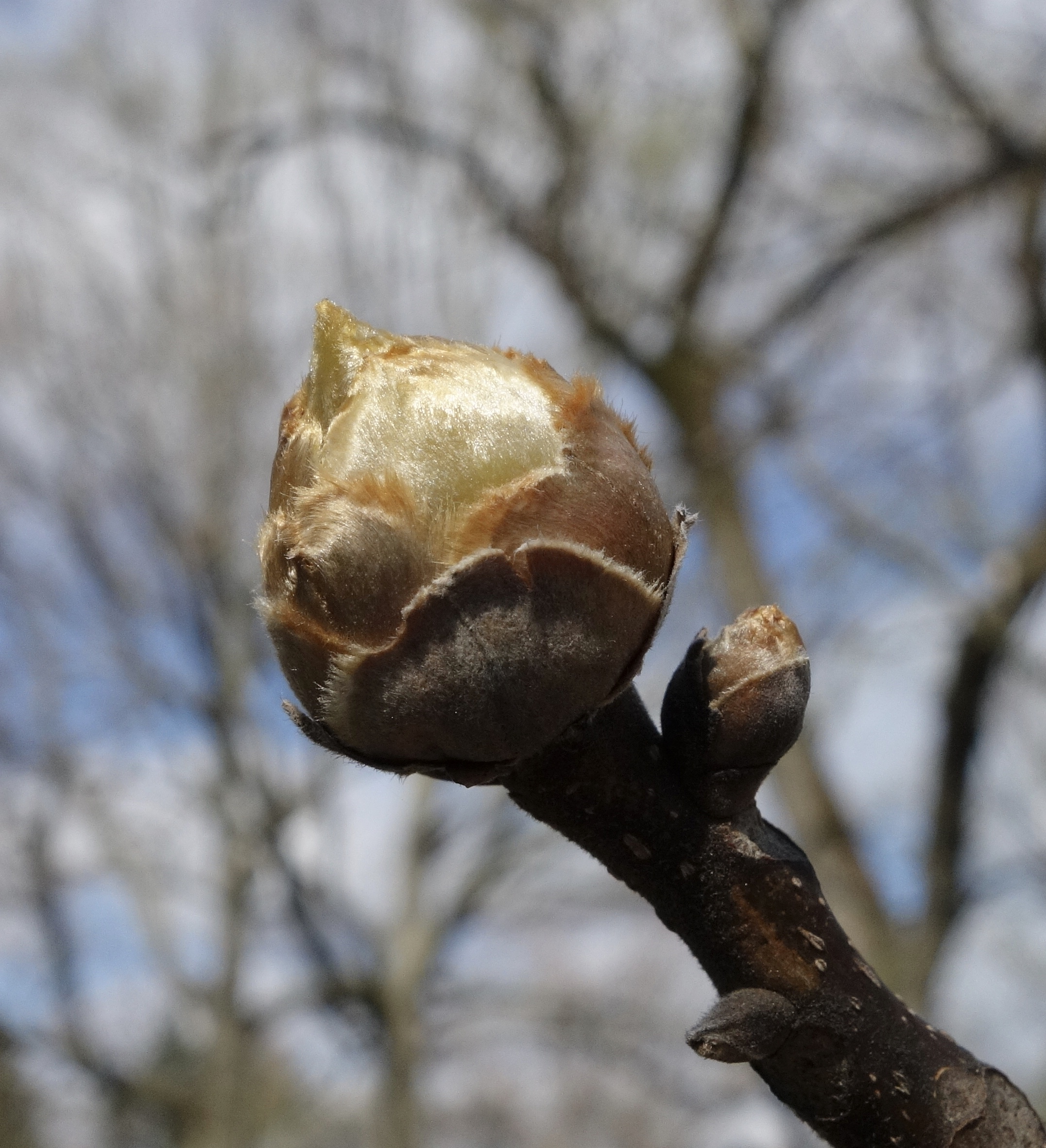
Bud

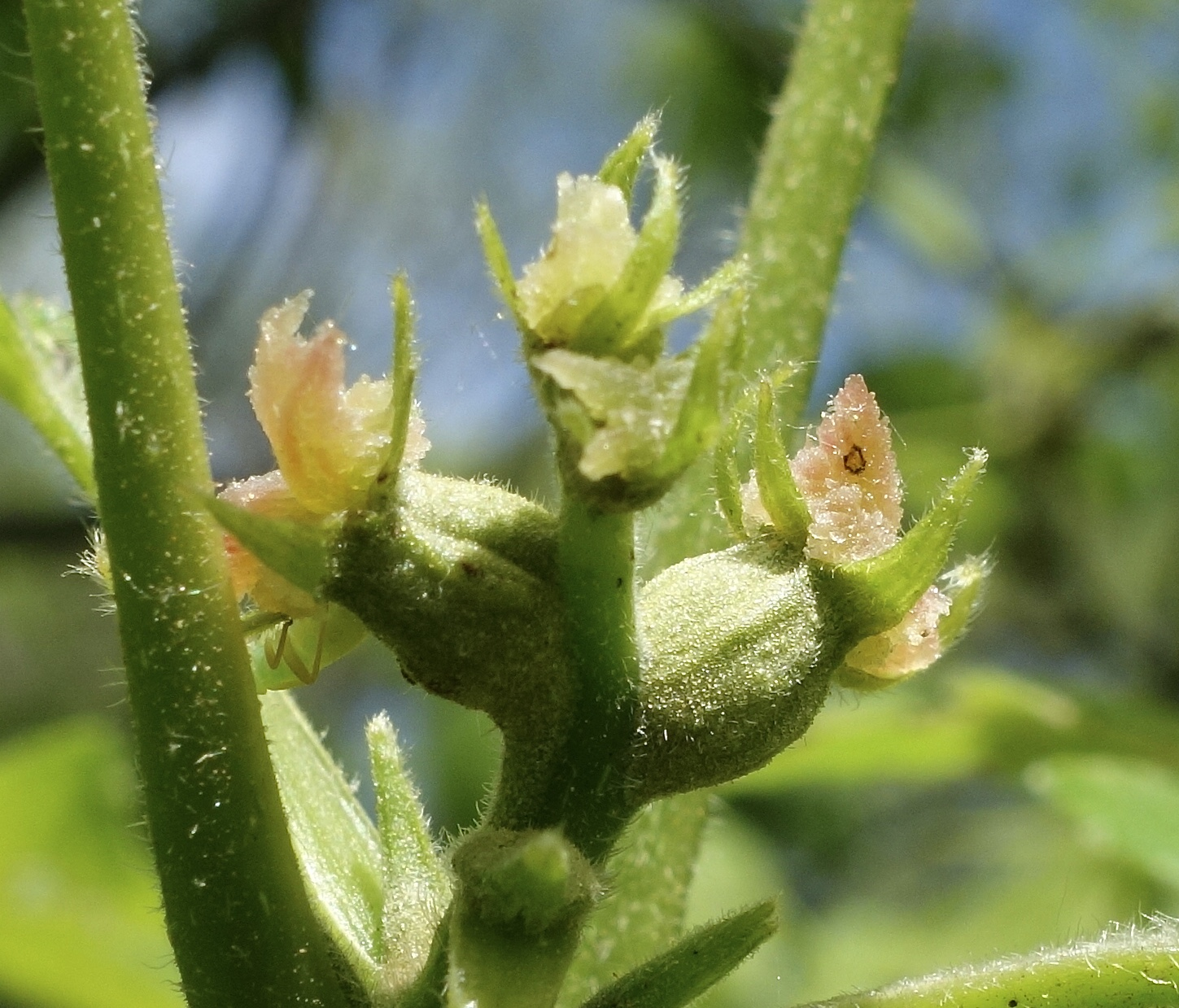
Female flowers

Leaf

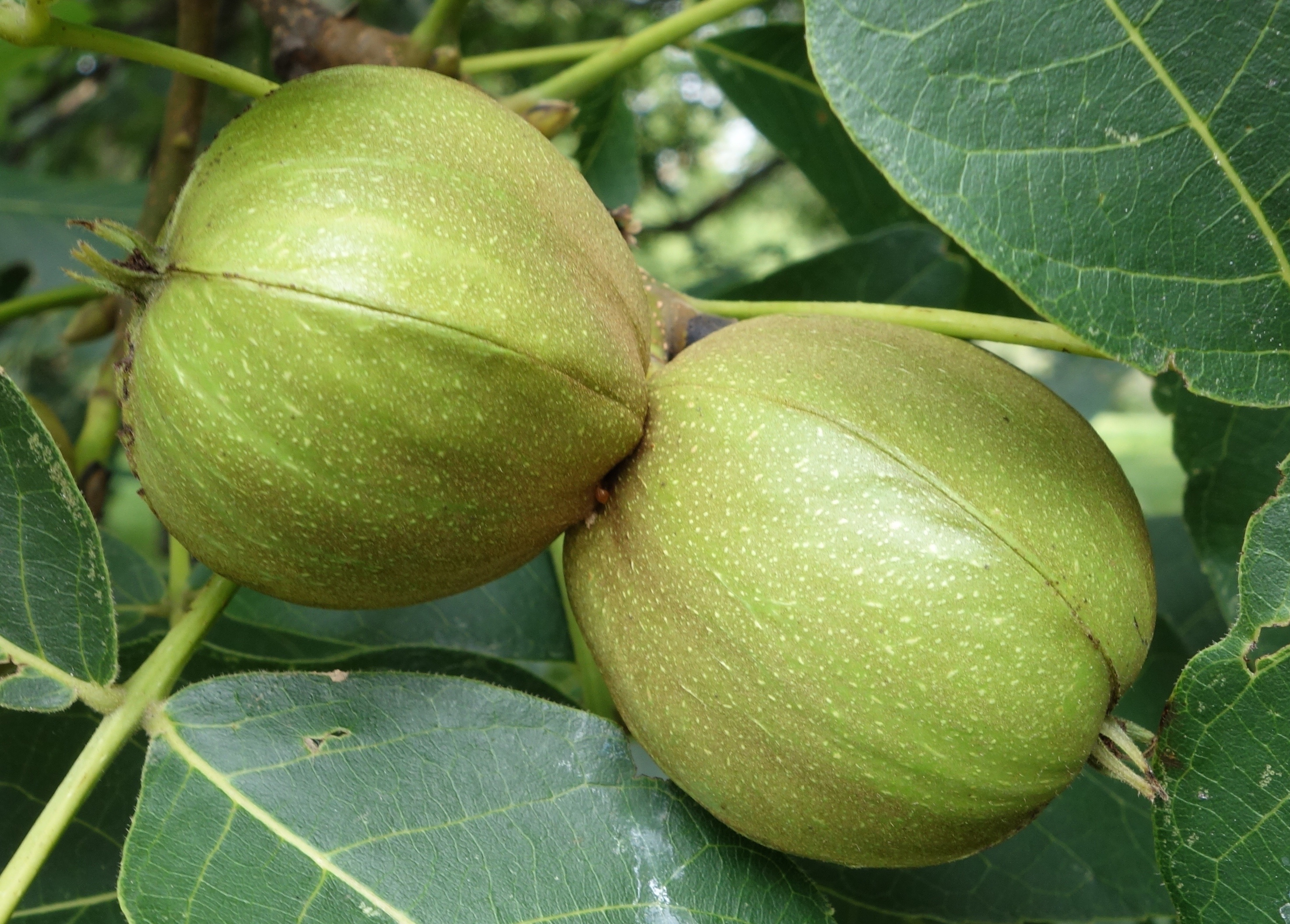
Maturing fruit
