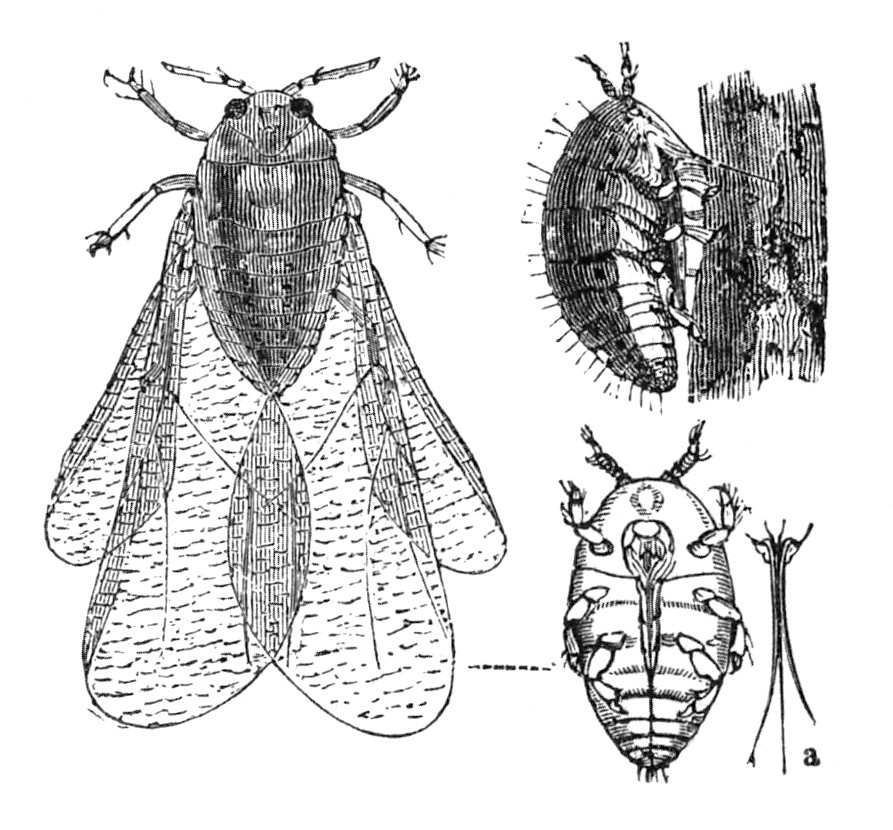

Scientific classification
- Kingdom: Animalia
- Phylum: Arthropoda
- Clade: Pancrustacea
- Class: Insecta
- Order: Hemiptera
- Suborder: Sternorrhyncha
- Family: Phylloxeridae
- Genus: Daktulosphaira; Shimer, 1866
- Species: D. vitifoliae

Binomial name
- Daktulosphaira vitifoliae (Fitch, 1855)

= Phylloxera =

Species of insect that plagues grapevines

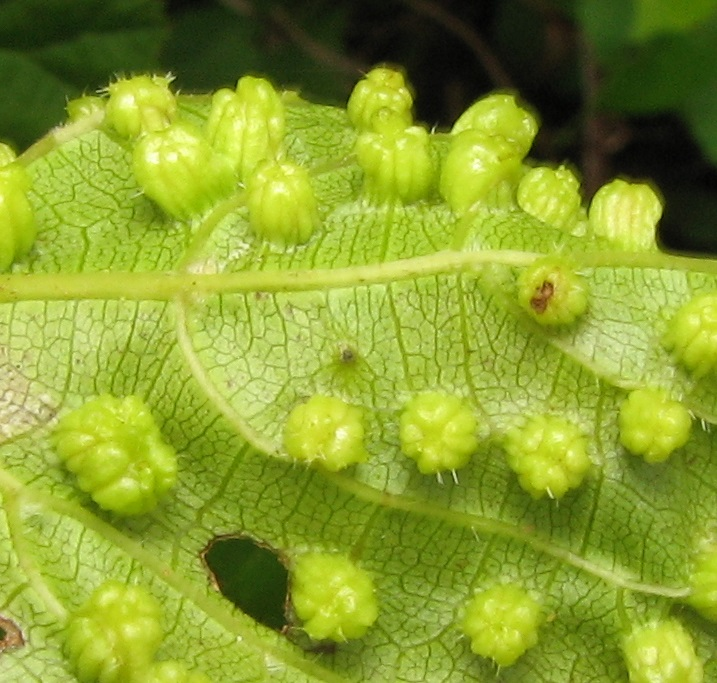
Galls made by D. vitifoliae on leaf of Vitis sp.

Grape phylloxera is an insect pest of grapevines worldwide, originally native to eastern North America. Grape phylloxera (Daktulosphaira vitifoliae Fitch 1855) belongs to the family Phylloxeridae, within the order Hemiptera, bugs); originally described in France as Phylloxera vastatrix; it is equated to the previously described Daktulosphaera vitifoliae and Phylloxera vitifoliae. The insect is commonly just called phylloxera (/fɪˈlɒksərə/; from Ancient Greek: φύλλον, leaf, and ξηρός, dry).

These almost microscopic, pale yellow, sap-sucking insects, related to aphids, feed on the roots and leaves of grapevines (depending on the phylloxera genetic strain). On Vitis vinifera, the resulting deformations on roots ("nodosities" and "tuberosities") and secondary fungal infections can girdle roots, gradually cutting off the flow of nutrients and water to the vine. Nymphs also form protective galls on the undersides of grapevine leaves of some Vitis species and overwinter under the bark or on the vine roots; these leaf galls are typically only found on the leaves of American vines.

American vine species (such as Vitis labrusca) have evolved to have several natural defenses against phylloxera. The roots of the American vines exude a sticky sap that repels the nymph form by clogging its mouth when it tries to feed from the vine. If the nymph is successful in creating a feeding wound on the root, American vines respond by forming a protective layer of tissue to cover the wound and protect it from secondary bacterial or fungal infections.

Currently, no cure for phylloxera is known, and unlike other grape diseases such as powdery or downy mildew, no chemical control or response is available. The only successful means of controlling phylloxera has been the grafting of phylloxera-resistant American rootstock (usually hybrid varieties created from the Vitis berlandieri, V. riparia, and V. ruprestris species) to more susceptible European V. vinifera vines.

== Biology ==
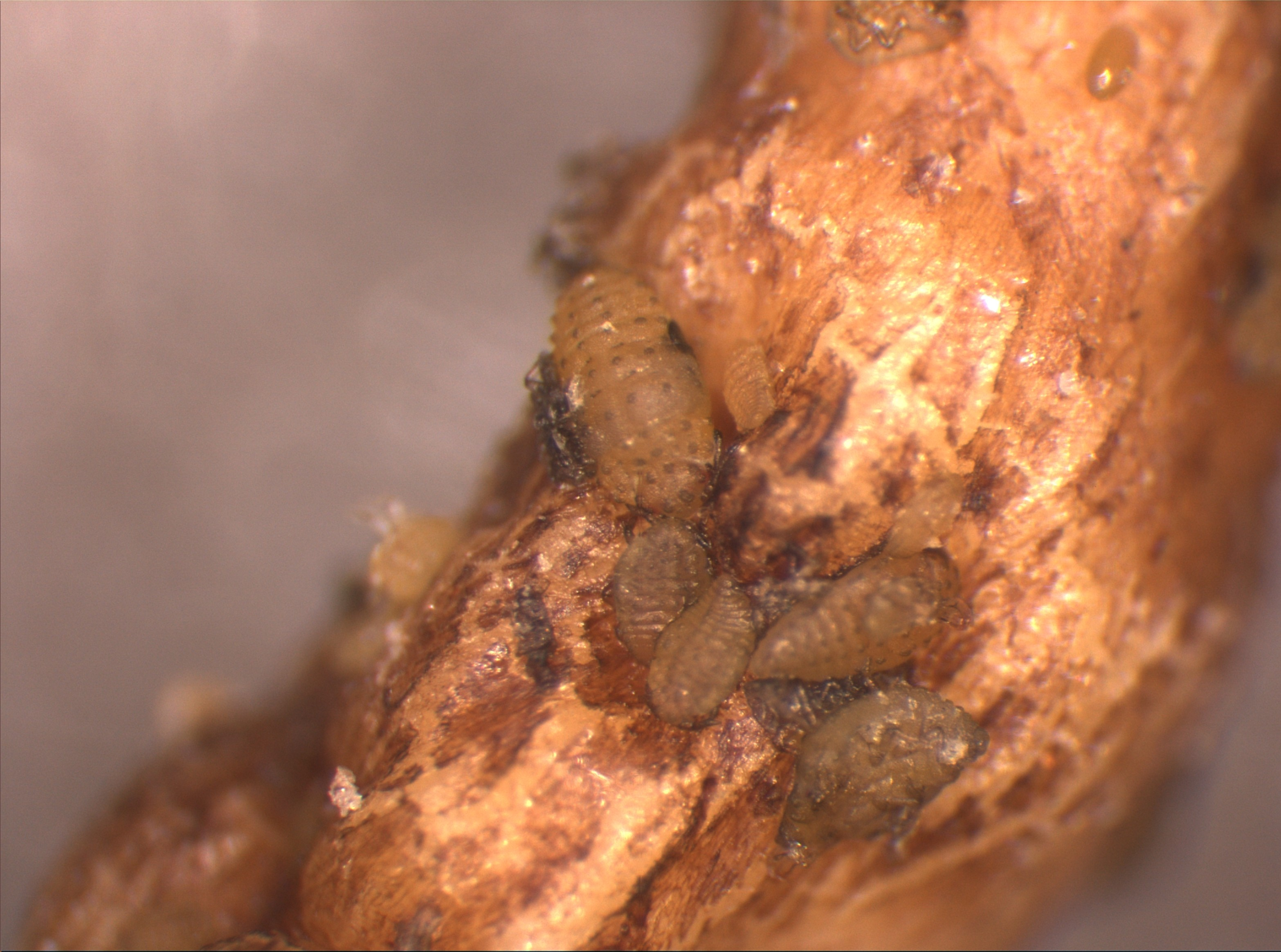
Phylloxera nymphs feeding on the roots

Phylloxera has a complex lifecycle of up to 18 stages that can be divided into these four principal forms:

- The sexual form begins with male and female eggs laid on the underside of young grape leaves. The male and female at this stage lack a digestive system, and once hatched, they mate and then die. Before the female dies, she lays one winter egg in the bark of the vine's trunk.
- This egg develops into the leaf form. This nymph, the fundatrix (stem mother), climbs onto a leaf and lays eggs parthenogenetically in a leaf gall that she creates by injecting saliva into the leaf. The nymphs that hatch from these eggs may move to other leaves, or move to the roots where they begin new infections in the root form.
- In this root form, they perforate the root to find nourishment, infecting the root with a poisonous secretion that stops it from healing. This poison eventually kills the vine. This nymph reproduces by laying eggs for up to seven more generations (which also can reproduce parthenogenetically) each summer. These offspring spread to other roots of the vine, or to the roots of other vines through cracks in the soil. The generation of nymphs that hatch in the autumn hibernate in the roots and emerge next spring when the sap begins to rise.
- In humid areas, the nymphs develop into the winged form or perform the same role without wings. These nymphs start the cycle again by either staying on the vine to lay male and female eggs on the bottom side of young grape leaves, or flying to an uninfected vine to do the same.

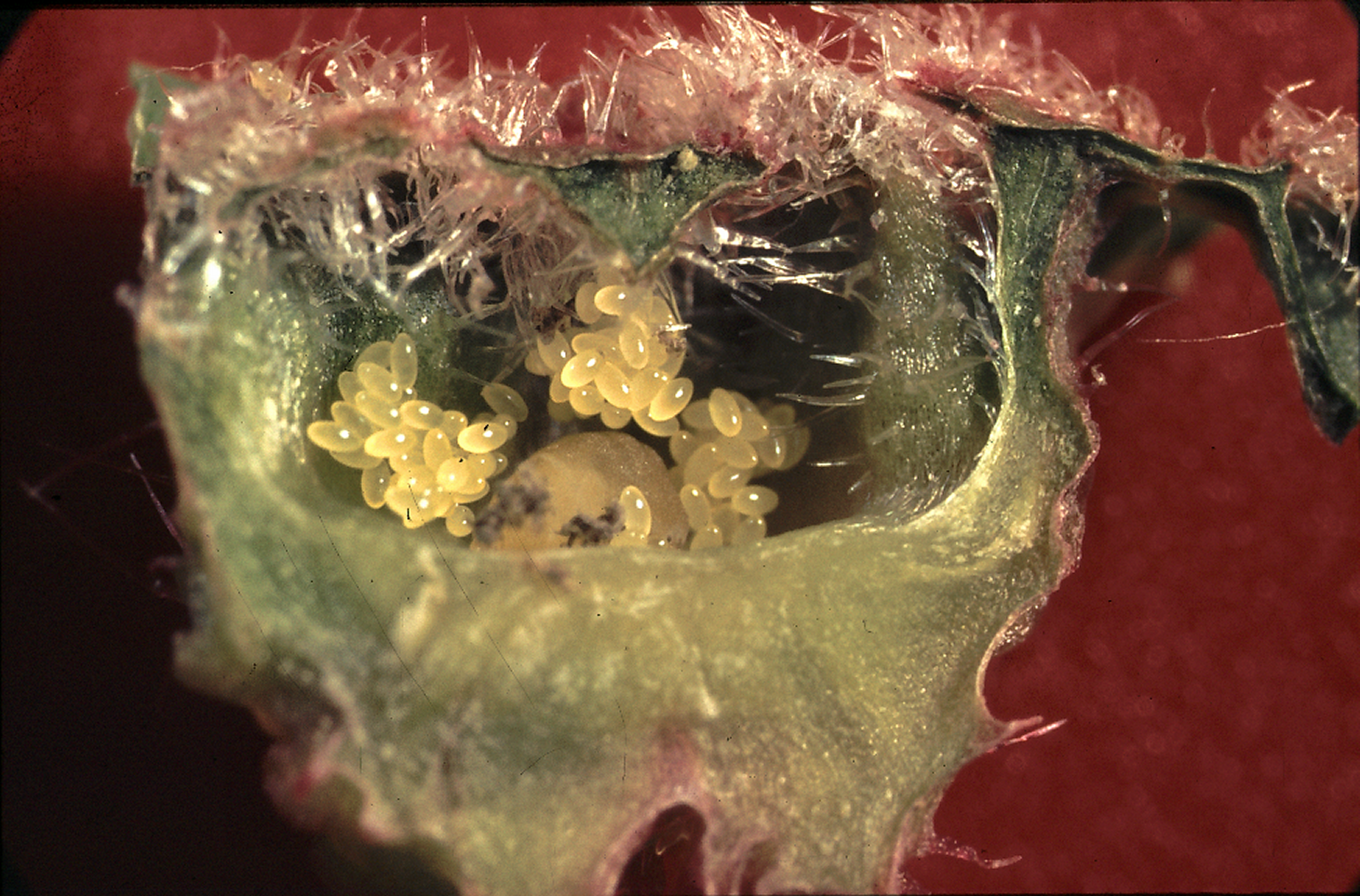
Phylloxera eggs inside a leaf gall

Many attempts have been made to interrupt this lifecycle to eradicate phylloxera, but it has proven to be extremely adaptable, as no one stage of the lifecycle is solely dependent upon another for the propagation of the species.

== Fighting the "phylloxera plague" ==
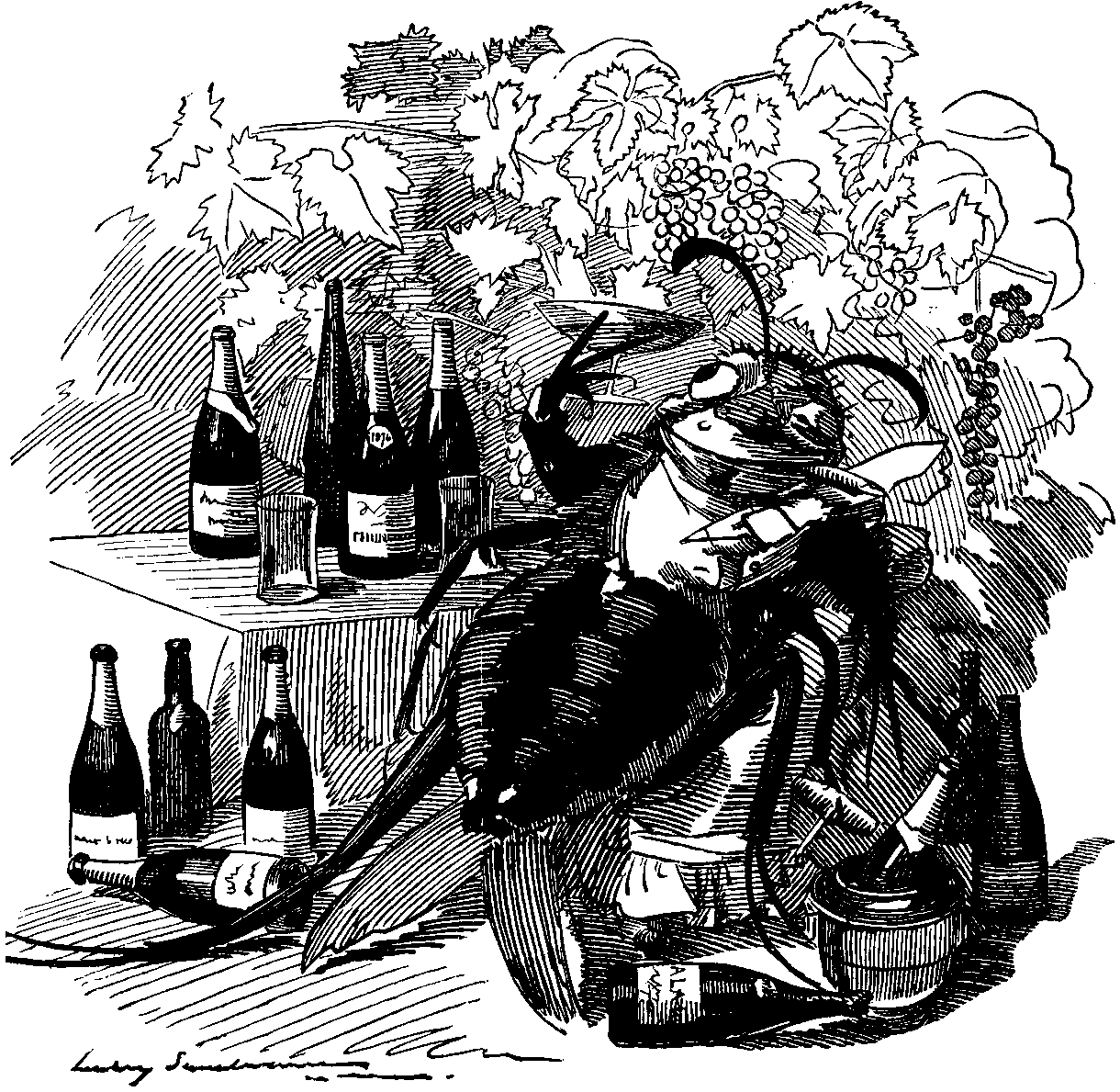
"The phylloxera, a true gourmet, finds out the best vineyards and attaches itself to the best wines." Cartoon from Punch, 6 Sep. 1890)

In the late 19th century, a phylloxera epidemic destroyed most of the vineyards for wine grapes in Europe, most notably in France. Phylloxera was introduced to Europe when avid botanists in Victorian England collected specimens of American vines in the 1850s. Because phylloxera is native to North America, the native grape species are at least partially resistant. By contrast, the European wine grape V. vinifera is very susceptible to the insect. The epidemic devastated vineyards in Britain and then moved to the European mainland, destroying most of the European grape-growing industry. In 1863, the first vines began to deteriorate inexplicably in the southern Rhône region of France. The problem spread rapidly across the continent. In France alone, total wine production fell from 84.5 million hectolitres in 1875 to only 23.4 million hectolitres in 1889. Some estimates hold that between two-thirds and nine-tenths of all European vineyards were destroyed.

In France, one of the desperate measures of grape growers was to bury a live toad under each vine to draw out the "poison". Areas with soils composed principally of sand or schist were spared, and the spread was slowed in dry climates, but phylloxera gradually spread across the continent. A significant amount of research was devoted to finding a solution to the phylloxera problem, and two major solutions gradually emerged – grafting cuttings onto resistant rootstocks and hybridization.

=== Response ===
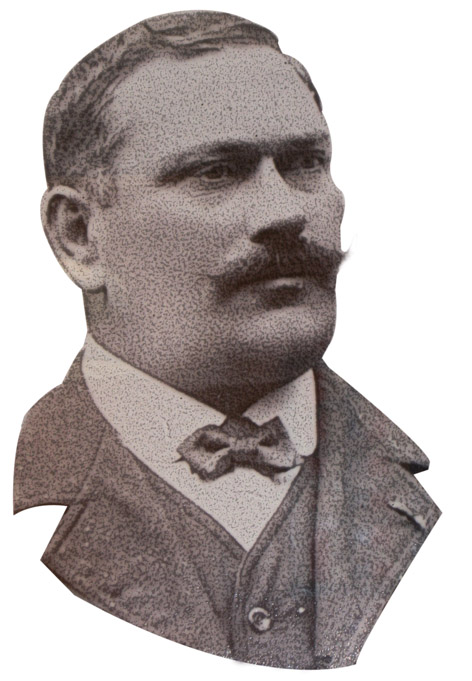
François Baco, creator of Baco blanc, was one of many grape breeders to introduce hybrid wine grape varieties in response to the phylloxera epidemic.

By the end of the 19th century, hybridization became a popular avenue of research for stopping phylloxera. Hybridization is the breeding of V. vinifera with resistant species. Most native American grapes are naturally phylloxera resistant (V. aestivalis, V. rupestris, and V. riparia are particularly so, while V. labrusca has a somewhat weak resistance to it), but have aromas that are off-putting to palates accustomed to European grapes. The intent of the cross was to generate a hybrid vine that was resistant to phylloxera, but produced wine that did not taste like the American grape. The hybrids tend not to be especially resistant to phylloxera, although they are much hardier with respect to climate and other vine diseases. The new hybrid varieties have never gained the popularity of the traditional ones. In the European Union, they are generally banned or at least strongly discouraged from use in quality wine, although they are still in widespread use in much of North America, such as Missouri, Ontario, and upstate New York.

=== Grafting with resistant rootstock ===
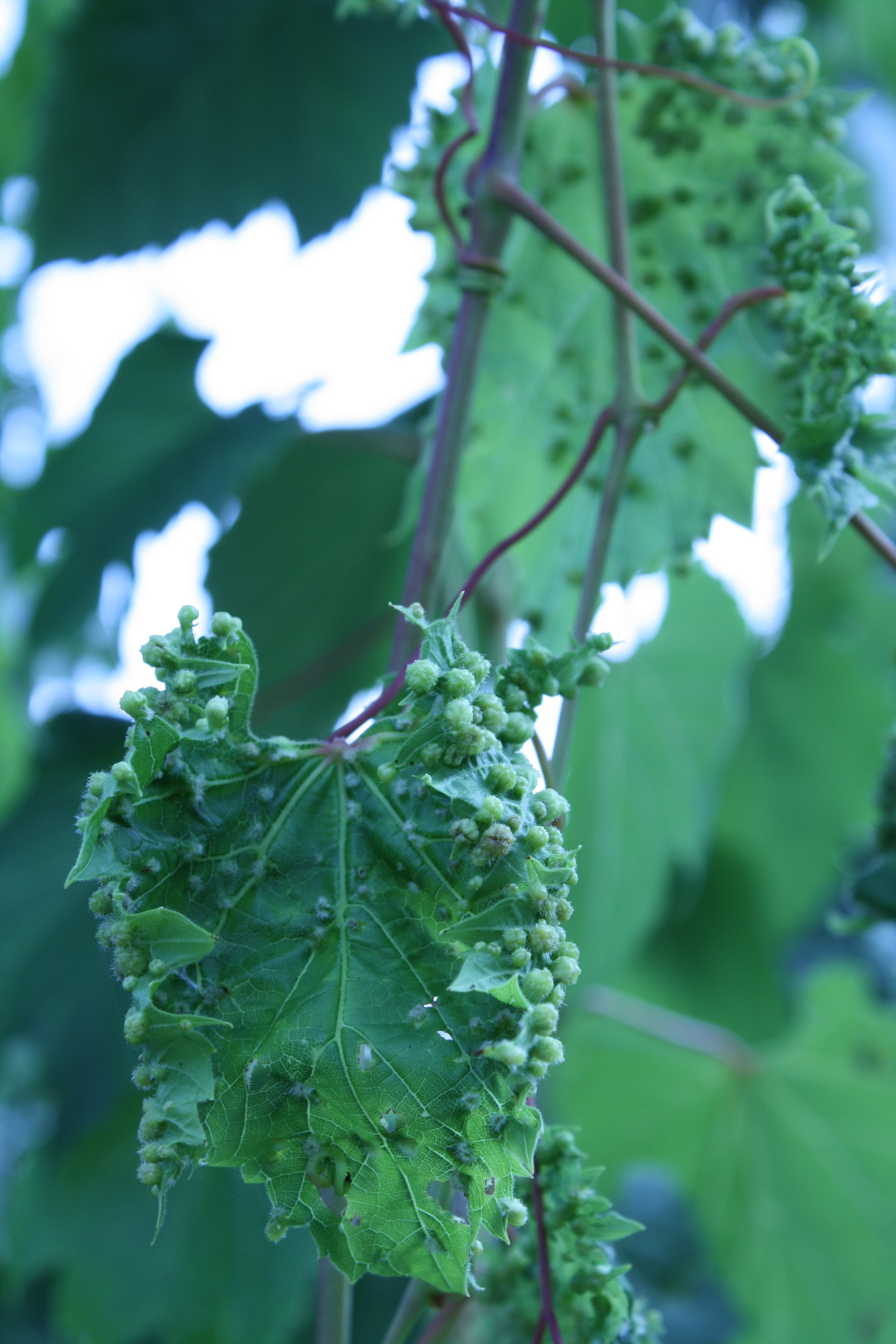
A grape leaf showing the galls that are formed during a phylloxera infestation

Use of a resistant, or tolerant, rootstock, developed by Charles Valentine Riley in collaboration with J. E. Planchon and promoted by T. V. Munson, involved grafting a V. vinifera scion onto the roots of a resistant V. aestivalis or other American native species. This is the preferred method today, because the rootstock does not interfere with the development of the wine grapes (more technically, the genes responsible for the grapes are not in the rootstock, but in the scion), and it furthermore allows the customization of the rootstock to soil and weather conditions, as well as desired vigor.

Not all rootstocks are equally resistant. Between the 1960s and the 1980s in California, many growers used a rootstock called AxR1. Though it had already failed in many parts of the world by the early 20th century, it was thought to be resistant by growers in California. Although phylloxera initially did not feed heavily on AxR1 roots, within 20 years, mutation and selective pressures within the phylloxera population began to overcome this rootstock, resulting in the eventual failure of most vineyards planted on AxR1.

Many have suggested that this failure was predictable, as one parent of AxR1 is, in fact, a susceptible V. vinifera cultivar. The transmission of phylloxera tolerance is more complex, though, as is demonstrated by the continued success of 41B, an F1 hybrid of V. berlandieri and V. vinifera. Modern phylloxera infestation also occurs when wineries are in need of fruit immediately, and choose to plant ungrafted vines rather than wait for grafted vines to be available.

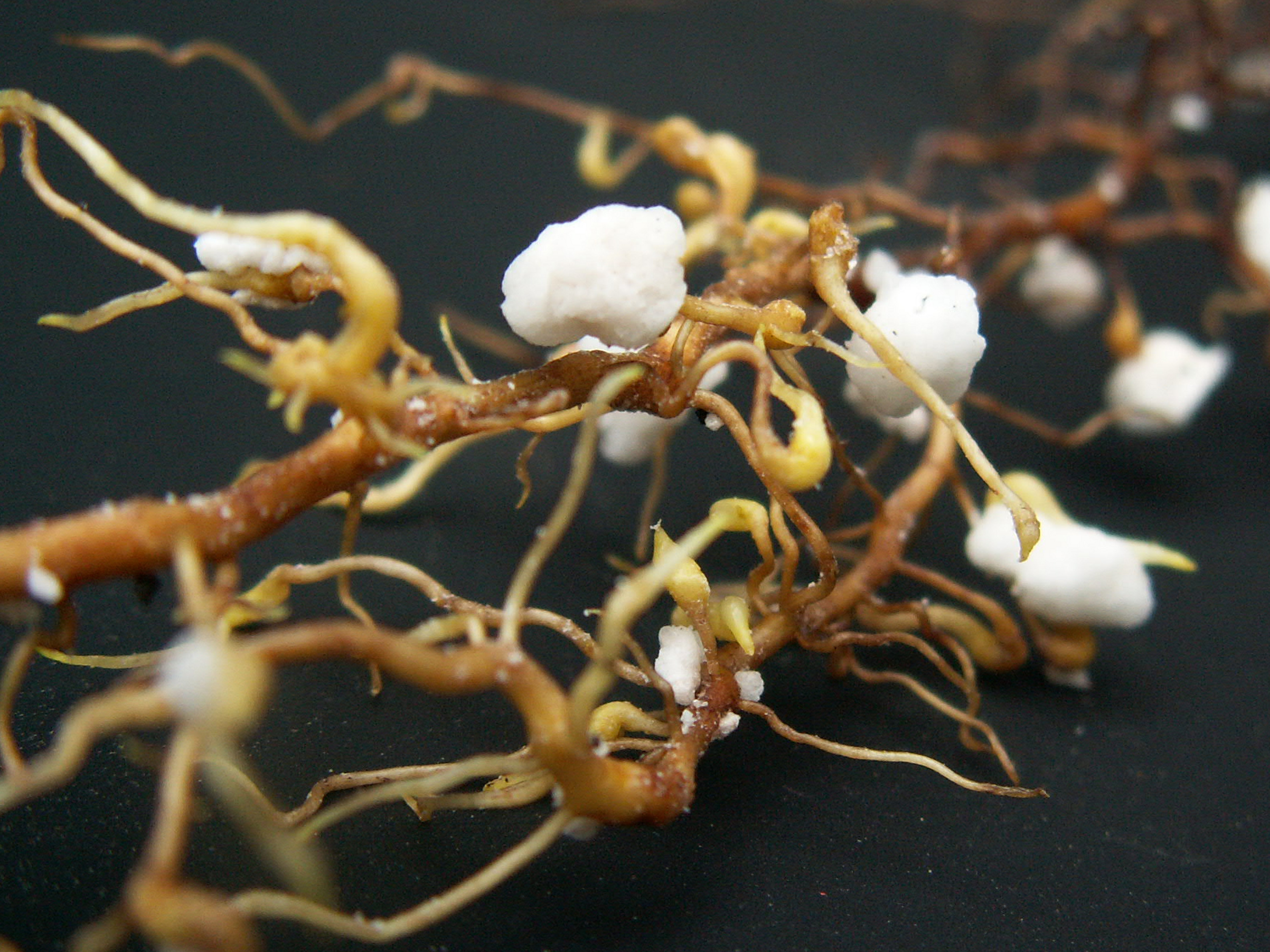
Roots that have been damaged by phylloxera

The use of resistant American rootstock to guard against phylloxera also brought about a debate that remains unsettled to this day, whether self-rooted vines produce better wine than those that are grafted. Of course, the argument is essentially irrelevant wherever phylloxera exists. Had American rootstock not been available and used, no V. vinifera wine industry in Europe or most places other than Chile, Washington, and most of Australia would exist. Cyprus was spared by the phylloxera plague, thus its wine stock has not been grafted for phylloxera-resistant purposes.

=== Aftermath ===
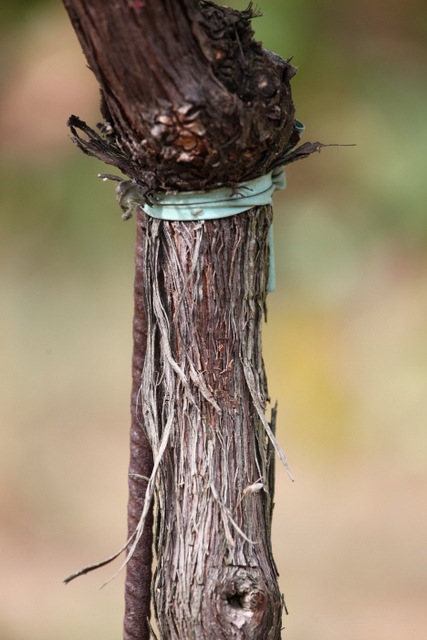
A grafted vine with the scion (grape variety) visible as the darker wood above the graft union and the rootstock variety below

The only European grapes that are natively resistant to phylloxera are the Assyrtiko grape, which grows on the volcanic island of Santorini, Greece, although whether the resistance is due to the rootstock itself or the volcanic ash on which it grows is unclear, and the Juan Garcia grape variety, autochthonous to the medieval village of Fermoselle in Spain. The Juan Garcia variety remained—untouched by phylloxera—sheltered on the vineyards planted on the man-made land terraces along the mountainous skirts on the gigantic and steep Duero Arribes / Douro River Canyon, where the microclimatic conditions discourage the growth of phylloxera.

To escape the threat of phylloxera, wines have been produced since 1979 on the sandy beaches of Provence's Bouches-du-Rhône, which extends from the coastline of the Gard region to the waterfront village of Saintes Maries de la Mer. The sand, sun, and wind in this area have been a major deterrent to phylloxera. The wine produced here is called vins des sables or "wines of the sands". In the same department, where the canal irrigation system built by the Romans still partly persists to this day, winter flooding is also practiced where possible, for instance south of the city of Tarascon. Flooding the vineyards for 50 days kills all the nymphs that overwinter in the roots or the bark at the bottom of the plant.

Some regions were so blighted by phylloxera that they never recovered, and instead the producers switched crops entirely. The island of Mallorca is one example, where almonds replaced vines.

== Vines that survived phylloxera ==
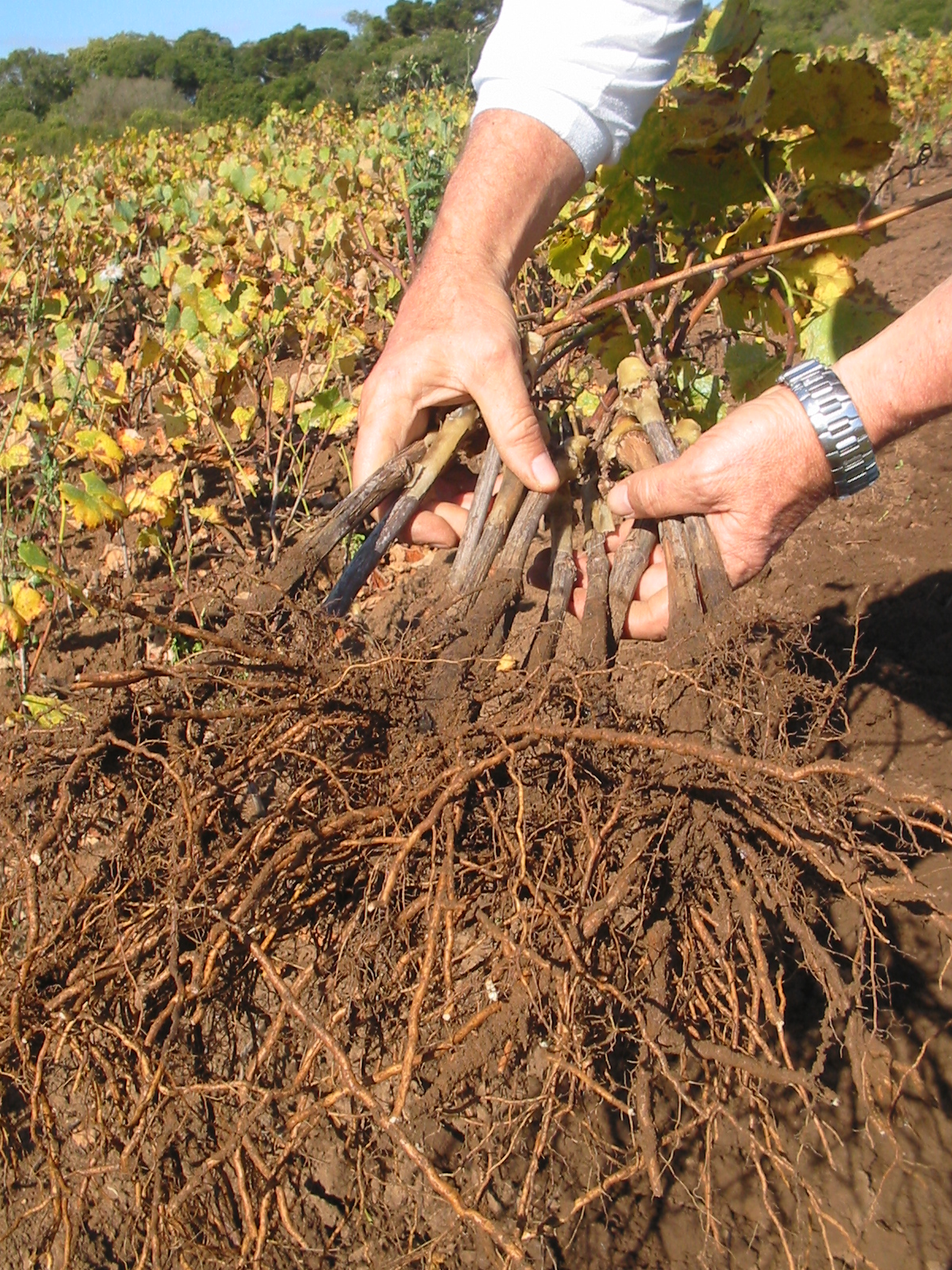
A collection of vines with grafted rootstocks

According to wine critic and author Kerin O'Keefe, due to tiny parcels of vineyards throughout Europe that were inexplicably unscathed, some vineyards still exist as they were before the phylloxera devastation.

So far, most Chilean wine grapes have remained phylloxera free. Chile is isolated from the rest of the world by the Atacama Desert to the north, the Pacific Ocean to the west, and the Andes Mountains to the east. Phylloxera has also never been found in several wine-growing regions of Australia, including Tasmania, Western Australia, and South Australia. Australia has strong internal biosecurity controls to minimise the risk of phylloxera spreading beyond 'Phylloxera Infested Zones' in parts of Victoria and New South Wales. The Riesling of the Mosel region has also remained untouched by phylloxera; the parasite is unable to survive in the slate soil.

Until 2005, three tiny parcels of ungrafted Pinot noir that escaped phylloxera were used to produce Bollinger Vieilles Vignes Françaises, one of the rarest and most expensive Champagnes available. In 2004, one of the parcels, Croix Rouge in Bouzy, died from phylloxera and was replanted with grafted rootstock.

A rare vintage port is made from ungrafted vines grown on a small parcel, called Nacional, in the heart of the Quinta do Noval. Why this plot survived is unknown.

Another vineyard unaffected by the phylloxera is the Lisini estate in Montalcino in Italy, a half-hectare vineyard of Sangiovese, with vines dating back to the mid-1800s. Since 1985, the winery has produced a few bottles of Prefillossero (Italian for "before the phylloxera"). The wine has a following, including Italian wine critic Luigi Veronelli, who inscribed on a bottle of the 1987 at the winery that drinking Prefillossero was like listening to "the earth singing to the sky".

Jumilla in southeastern Spain is an important area of ungrafted vineyards, mainly from Monastrell grapes. Those vineyards, however, are not immune to the insect, which is slowly advancing and destroying the Pie Franco vineyard of the Casa Castillo estate, planted in 1942, i.e., when phylloxera had already been in the region for five decades.

Large swaths of vineyards on the slopes of Sicily's volcano Mount Etna also remain free of phylloxera. Some vines are more than 150 years old, antedating the phylloxera infestation in Sicily (1879–1880). Part of the reason for this is the high concentration of silica sand and very low (less than 3%) concentration of clay in the volcanic soils. In this environment (at an elevation more than 400 m AMSL), the surface water from heavy bouts of rain seals the soil so perfectly that it drowns phylloxera before they are able to thrive.

Bien Nacido Vineyard in Santa Maria Valley AVA of Santa Barbara, California, is a phylloxera-free vineyard. Despite being planted on its own roots, with UC Davis virus-free clones, the vineyard has never been affected by phylloxera. The high percentage of sand in the soil creates a mostly uninhabitable substrate for phylloxera. While Bien Nacido has not been affected, a potential infection remains, as all of the vines are true V. vinifera without scions or grafting. Many of the old vines were planted in 1973 and fall within the blocks G, N, Q, and W. The wines of Bien Nacido Estate have a high percentage of these ungrafted and phylloxera-free vines within the cuvée.

Colares vineyards, native to the Portuguese region of Sintra, are grown on 3–4 metres of sand, so are unaffected by phylloxera.
