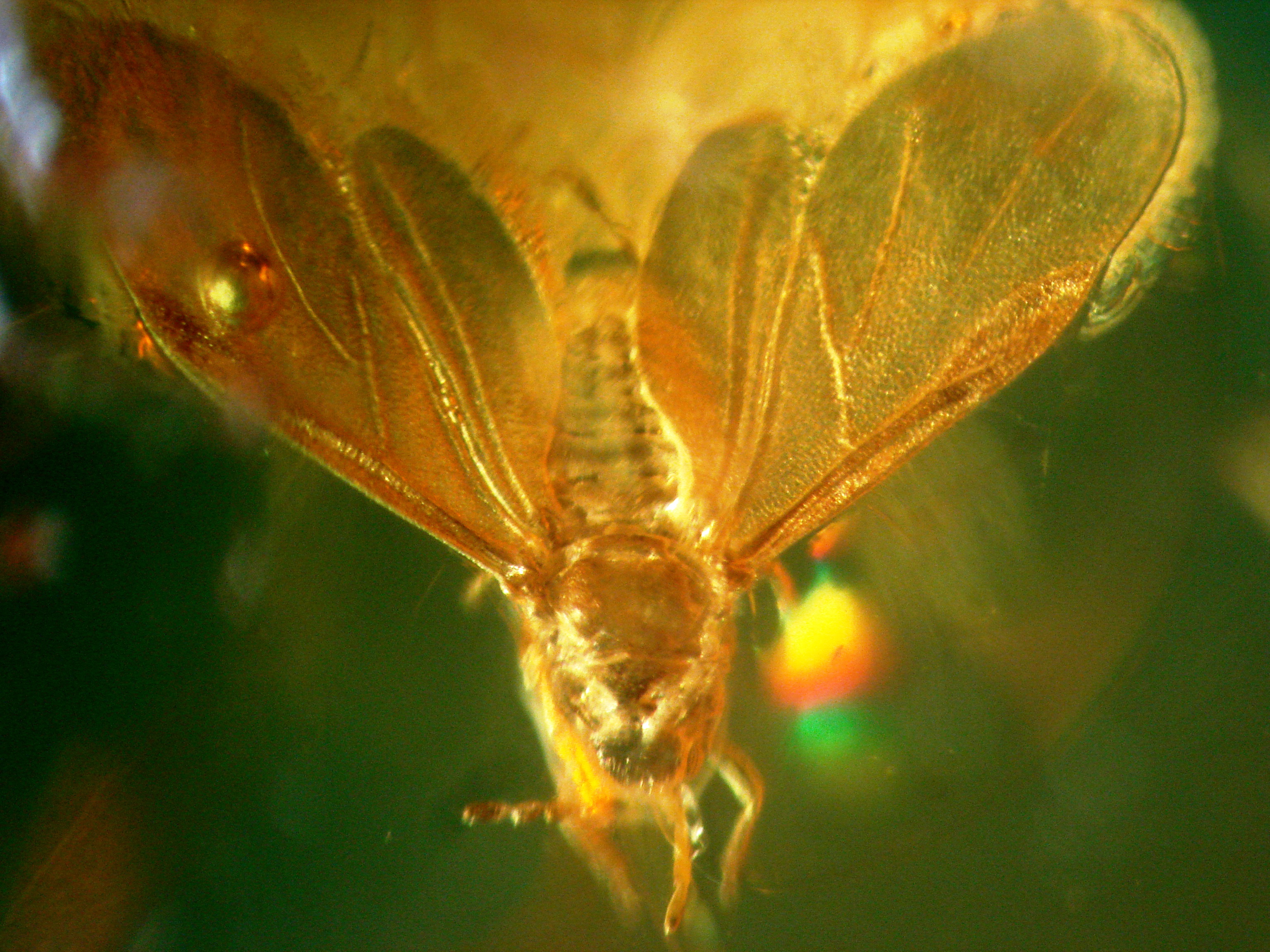
- Unidentified Aphidomorpha in Baltic amber

Scientific classification
- Domain: Eukaryota
- Kingdom: Animalia
- Phylum: Arthropoda
- Class: Insecta
- Order: Hemiptera
- Suborder: Sternorrhyncha
- Infraorder: Aphidomorpha; Heslop-Harrison, 1952

Superfamilies
- Adelgoidea Schouteden, 1909; Aphidoidea Latreille, 1802; †Genaphidoidea Handlirsch, 1908; †Lutevanaphidoidea Szwedo, Lapeyrie & Nel, 2014; †Naibioidea Shcherbakov, 2007; †Palaeoaphidoidea Richards, 1966; Phylloxeroidea Herrich-Schaeffer, 1854; †Tajmyraphidoidea Kononova, 1975; †Triassoaphidoidea Heie, 1999

= Aphidomorpha =

Infraorder of true bugs

Aphidomorpha is an infraorder within the insect order Sternorrhyncha which includes the aphids and their allies in the superfamilies Adelgoidea, Phylloxeroidea and Aphidoidea. This group also includes numerous fossil taxa of uncertain placement, such as these other superfamilies Triassoaphidoidea, Genaphidoidea, Palaeoaphidoidea, and Tajmyraphidoidea.

The treatment of the members in the group varies and the following variant treatments of the extant families can be found in literature.

- Aphidomorpha
  - Aphidoidea
  - Adelgoidea
  - Phylloxeroidea

- Aphidomorpha
  - Aphidoidea
    - Aphididae
    - Adelgidae
    - Phylloxeridae

- Aphidomorpha
  - Aphidoidea
  - Phylloxeroidea
    - Phylloxeridae
    - Adelgidae
