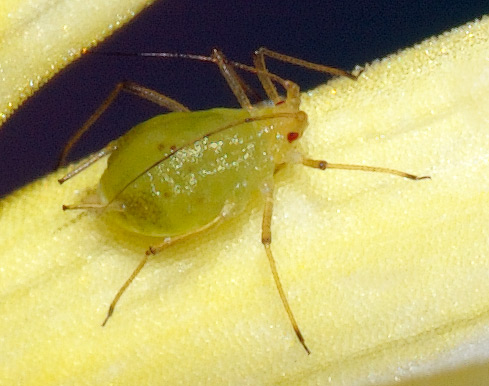
- An aphid

Scientific classification
- Kingdom: Animalia
- Phylum: Arthropoda
- Clade: Pancrustacea
- Class: Insecta
- Order: Hemiptera
- Suborder: Sternorrhyncha; André Marie Constant Duméril, 1806

Superfamilies
- Aleyrodoidea; Aphidoidea; Coccoidea; Phylloxeroidea; Psylloidea

= Sternorrhyncha =

Sternorrhyncha Temporal range: Permian–Recent

Order of true bugs

The Sternorrhyncha suborder of the Hemiptera contains the aphids, whiteflies, and scale insects, groups which were traditionally included in the now-obsolete order "Homoptera". The name "Sternorrhyncha" refers to the rearward position of the mouthparts relative to the head.

Distributed worldwide, all members of this group are plant-feeders, many considered pests feeding on major crops and ornamental plants.

Many exhibit modified morphology and/or life cycles, including phenomena such as flightless morphs, parthenogenesis, sexual dimorphism, and eusociality.

== Phylogeny ==
The phylogeny of the extant Sternorrhyncha, from a 2024 study using ultraconserved genetic elements, is shown in the cladogram:

- Sternorrhyncha
  - - Aleyrodoidea (whiteflies)
    - Psylloidea (jumping plant lice, etc.)
  - - Coccoidea (scale insects)
    - Aphidomorpha
      - Phylloxeroidea (phylloxera bugs)
      - Aphididae (aphids)

The evolutionary position of several fossil taxa are unclear. A suggested phylogeny is:

- - †Pincombeomorpha
    - Boreoscytidae
    - Pincombeidae
    - Simulaphididae
  - - - Coccidomorpha
      - - †Naibiomorpha
          - Dracaphididae
          - Naibiidae
          - Sinojuraphididae
        - Aphidomorpha
    - - †Protopsyllidioidea
      - - - †Dinglomorpha
          - Aleyrodomorpha
        - - †Liadopsyllidae
          - Psylloidea

== Groups ==
Well-known groups in the Sternorrhyncha include:

- aphids – (Aphididae)
- woolly and gall-making aphids (Eriosomatinae)
- pine and spruce aphids (Adelgidae)
- phylloxerans (Phylloxeridae, including the vine phylloxera)
- whiteflies – (Aleyrodidae)
- jumping plant lice (Psyllidae and allied families)
- Superfamily Coccoidea (scale insects)
  - cottony cushion scales, giant coccids, and ground pearls (Margarodidae)
  - armoured scales (Diaspididae)
  - cochineal insects (Dactylopiidae)
  - lac scales (Kerriidae, Lacciferidae, Tachardinidae)
  - soft scales (Coccidae)
  - pit scales (Asterolecaniidae)
  - mealybugs (Pseudococcidae)
  - felted scales (Eriococcidae)
