= Laricobius rubidus =

Scientific classification
- Domain: Eukaryota
- Kingdom: Animalia
- Phylum: Arthropoda
- Class: Insecta
- Order: Coleoptera
- Suborder: Polyphaga
- Family: Derodontidae
- Genus: Laricobius
- Species: L. rubidus

Binomial name
- Laricobius rubidus LeConte, 1861

Species of beetle

Laricobius rubidus is a species of tooth-necked fungus beetle in the family Derodontidae. It is found in North America. Studies are ongoing to determine the rate of hybridization between L. rubidus, which feeds on pine bark adelgid, and its native congener, Laricobius nigrinus, which is being studied as a biological control agent for the hemlock woolly adelgid.
