= Derodontus unidentatus =

Scientific classification
- Domain: Eukaryota
- Kingdom: Animalia
- Phylum: Arthropoda
- Class: Insecta
- Order: Coleoptera
- Suborder: Polyphaga
- Family: Derodontidae
- Genus: Derodontus
- Species: D. unidentatus

Binomial name
- Derodontus unidentatus Lawrence, 1979

Species of beetle

Derodontus unidentatus is a species of tooth-necked fungus beetle in the family Derodontidae. It is found in North America.
