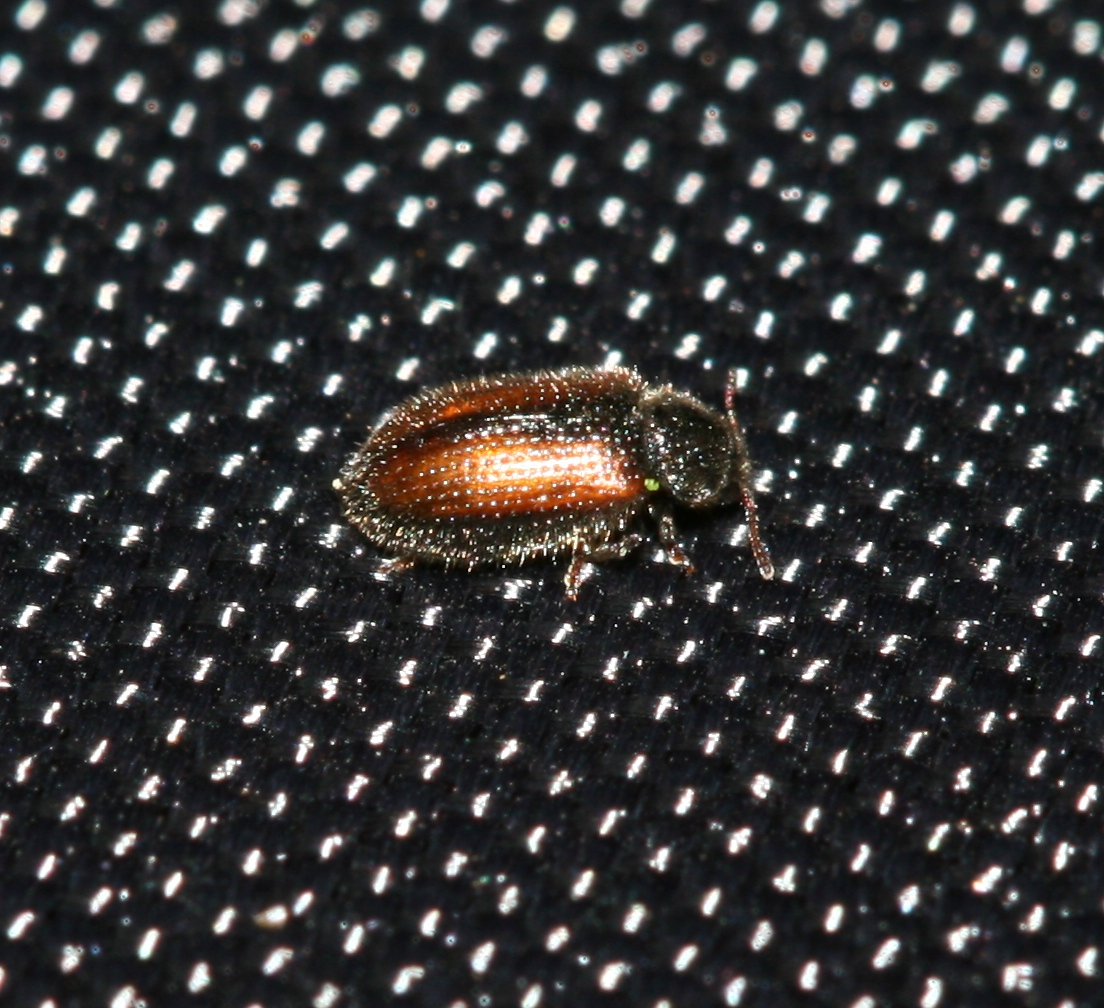
- Laricobius erichsoni

Scientific classification
- Kingdom: Animalia
- Phylum: Arthropoda
- Class: Insecta
- Order: Coleoptera
- Suborder: Polyphaga
- Family: Derodontidae
- Genus: Laricobius; Rosenhauer, 1846

Species
- 23, see text

= Laricobius =

Genus of beetles

Laricobius is a genus of beetles in the family Derodontidae, the tooth-necked fungus beetles.

It is one of four genera in the family. While the other three feed on fungi, Laricobius species feed on adelgids, tiny insects very similar to aphids. Some adelgids are destructive forest pests, and Laricobius beetles have been employed as agents of biological pest control to prey on them and reduce their populations. An example is Laricobius nigrinus, which is released in forests to control the hemlock woolly adelgid (Adelges tsugae).

As of 2014, there are about 23 species in the genus. Species include:

- Laricobius baoxingensis
- Laricobius bicolor
- Laricobius caucasicus
- Laricobius daliensis
- Laricobius danielae
- Laricobius erichsoni
- Laricobius incognitus
- Laricobius jizu
- Laricobius kangdingensis
- Laricobius kovalevi
- Laricobius ludmilae
- Laricobius laticollis
- Laricobius loebli
- Laricobius minutus
- Laricobius mirabilis
- Laricobius naganoensis
- Laricobius nigrinus
- Laricobius osakensis
- Laricobius rubidus
- Laricobius sahlbergi
- Laricobius schawalleri
- Laricobius taiwanensis
- Laricobius wittmeri
