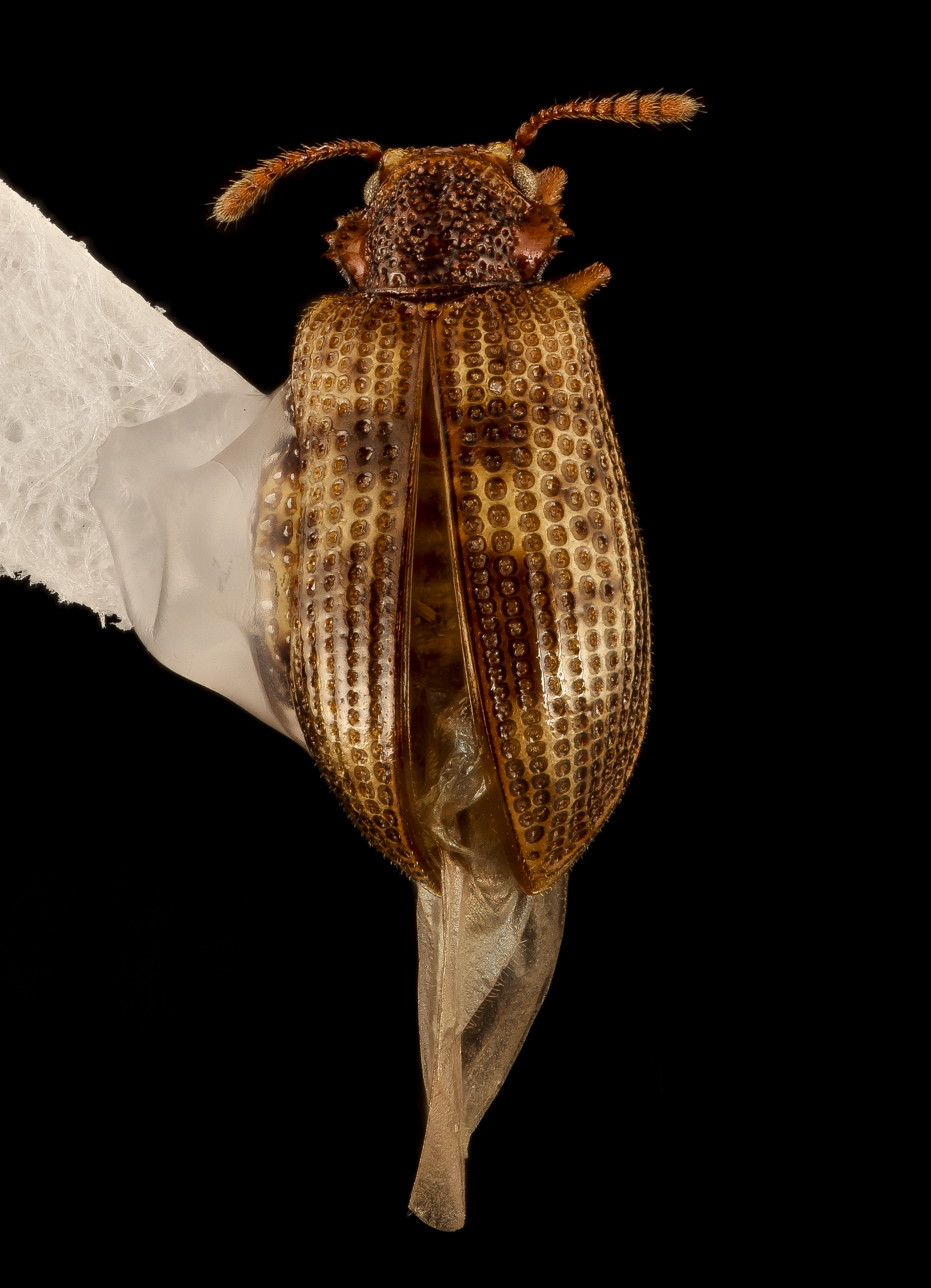

Scientific classification
- Domain: Eukaryota
- Kingdom: Animalia
- Phylum: Arthropoda
- Class: Insecta
- Order: Coleoptera
- Suborder: Polyphaga
- Family: Derodontidae
- Genus: Derodontus
- Species: D. maculatus

Binomial name
- Derodontus maculatus (Melsheimer, 1844)

= Derodontus maculatus =

Species of beetle

Derodontus maculatus is a species of tooth-necked fungus beetle in the family Derodontidae. It is found in North America. This species adapt in cooler climate regions or areas where colder seasonal changes occur.
