= Laricobius laticollis =

Scientific classification
- Domain: Eukaryota
- Kingdom: Animalia
- Phylum: Arthropoda
- Class: Insecta
- Order: Coleoptera
- Suborder: Polyphaga
- Family: Derodontidae
- Genus: Laricobius
- Species: L. laticollis

Binomial name
- Laricobius laticollis Fall, 1916

Species of beetle

Laricobius laticollis is a species of tooth-necked fungus beetle in the family Derodontidae. It is found in North America, including Canada and the continental United States.
