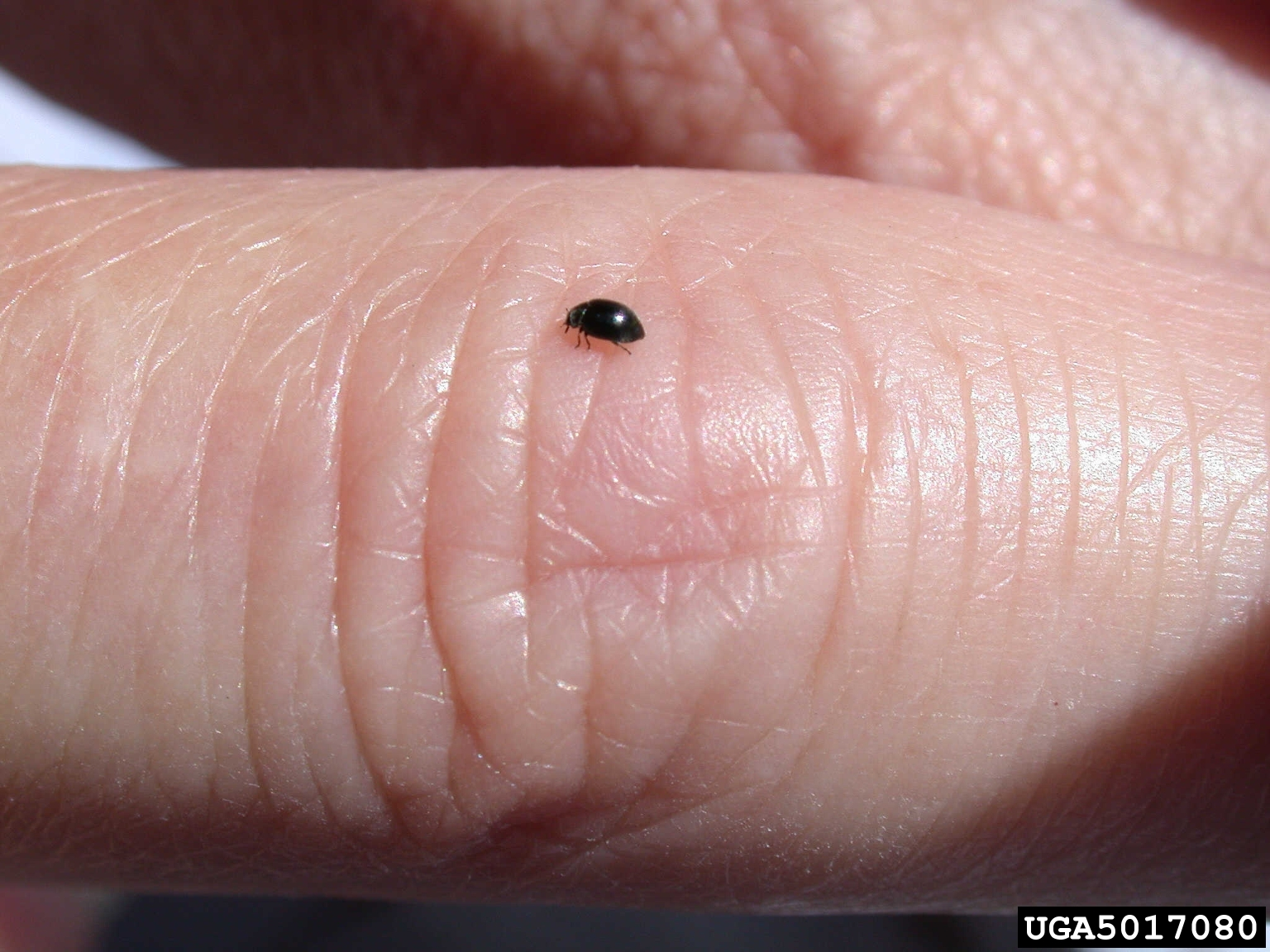
- On a human finger

Scientific classification
- Kingdom: Animalia
- Phylum: Arthropoda
- Clade: Pancrustacea
- Class: Insecta
- Order: Coleoptera
- Suborder: Polyphaga
- Infraorder: Cucujiformia
- Family: Coccinellidae
- Genus: Sasajiscymnus
- Species: S. tsugae

Binomial name
- Sasajiscymnus tsugae (Sasaji and McClure, 1997)

Synonyms
- Pseudoscymnus tsugae

= Sasajiscymnus tsugae =

Species of insect

Sasajiscymnus tsugae, formerly Pseudoscymnus tsugae, is a species of insect in the family Coccinellidae. It feeds on the hemlock woolly adelgid.

== Taxonomy ==
The species was first described by Hiroyuki Sasaji and Mark S. McClure in 1997 as Pseudoscymnus tsugae. It was later discovered that the genus name Pseudoscymnus (published for Coccinellidae in 1962) was already in use for a genus of shark, and in 2004 the replacement name Sasajiscymnus was published by Natalia Vandenberg, hence this species became Sasajiscymnus tsugae.

== History ==
The species is a biological control method for the hemlock woolly adelgid, Adelges tsugae, in North America, an invasive species that threatens the eastern hemlock, Tsuga canadensis and the Carolina hemlock, Tsuga caroliniana. S. tsugae is a black lady beetle that is relatively host-specific, feeding only on three known aldegid species, including hemlock woolly adelgid. This beetle was discovered in 1992 while feeding on hemlock woolly adelgid in its natural range of Japan. Since 1995, the Pennsylvania Department of Conservation and Natural Resources's Bureau of Forestry has released hundreds of thousands of adult S. tsugae beetles into affected hemlock forests of the eastern United States to determine its effectiveness at controlling the spread of the adelgid. From 1995 to 1997, experiments in Connecticut and Virginia found that releasing adult Sasajiscymnus tsugae beetles into infested hemlock stands resulted in a 47 to 88 percent reduction in adelgid densities within five months of introduction. The beetle's lifecycle is in parallel to the lifecycle of the hemlock woolly adelgid. Both lay eggs in the spring and hatching occurs nearly simultaneously. When hatched, S. tsugae larvae are highly mobile and feed on hemlock woolly adelgid eggs and larvae. Each S. tsugae larva can effectively consume about 500 adelgid eggs or nearly 100 developing adelgid nymphs.

== Description ==
Adult S. tsugae are oval-shaped and are about 1.1 mm wide by 1.7 mm long. They are entirely black and are pubescent on their upper surface. Eggs are reddish-orange in color, oval-shaped, and 0.25 mm wide by 0.48 mm long inside an opalescent chorion. The eggs are usually laid individually or in small groups in bark crevices and in the scales of buds. The larvae grow from about 1.1 mm to 2.7 mm during their four developmental instars. They change color from reddish-brown to gray as they mature. The pupa is about 1.1 mm wide and 1.9 mm long and is reddish-brown color. The adults emerge as a light golden brown color and then to jet black after about one day.
