= Laricobius osakensis =

Scientific classification
- Kingdom: Animalia
- Phylum: Arthropoda
- Class: Insecta
- Order: Coleoptera
- Suborder: Polyphaga
- Family: Derodontidae
- Genus: Laricobius
- Species: L. osakensis

Binomial name
- Laricobius osakensis Shiyake and Montgomery, et al., 2011

Species of beetle

Laricobius osakensis is a species of derodontid beetle native to Japan. Described in 2011, it feeds exclusively on hemlock woolly adelgid (Adelges tsugae), an invasive insect species that is destroying huge numbers of hemlock trees in eastern North America. It has shown promise as a biological control agent in field trials.
