= Derodontus japonicus =

Scientific classification
- Kingdom: Animalia
- Phylum: Arthropoda
- Class: Insecta
- Order: Coleoptera
- Suborder: Polyphaga
- Family: Derodontidae
- Genus: Derodontus
- Species: D. japonicus

Binomial name
- Derodontus japonicus Hisamatsu, 1964

Species of beetle

Derodontus japonicus is a species of tooth-necked fungus beetle in the family Derodontidae. It is found primarily in Japan, but has also been recorded in Taiwan.
