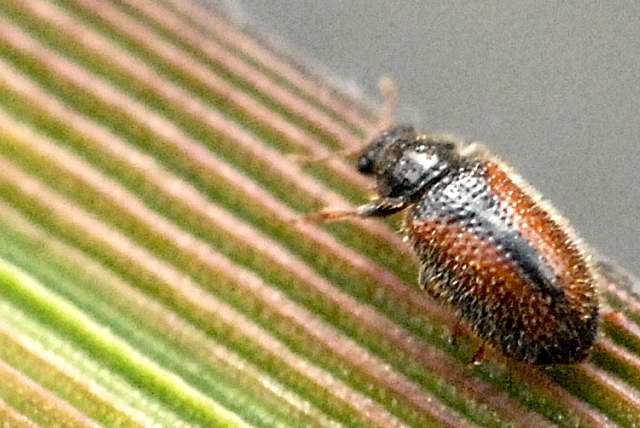

Scientific classification
- Domain: Eukaryota
- Kingdom: Animalia
- Phylum: Arthropoda
- Class: Insecta
- Order: Coleoptera
- Suborder: Polyphaga
- Family: Derodontidae
- Genus: Laricobius
- Species: L. erichsoni

Binomial name
- Laricobius erichsoni Rosenhauer, 1846

= Laricobius erichsoni =

Species of beetle

Laricobius erichsoni is a species of tooth-necked fungus beetle in the family Derodontidae. It is found in Europe and Northern Asia (excluding China) and North America.
