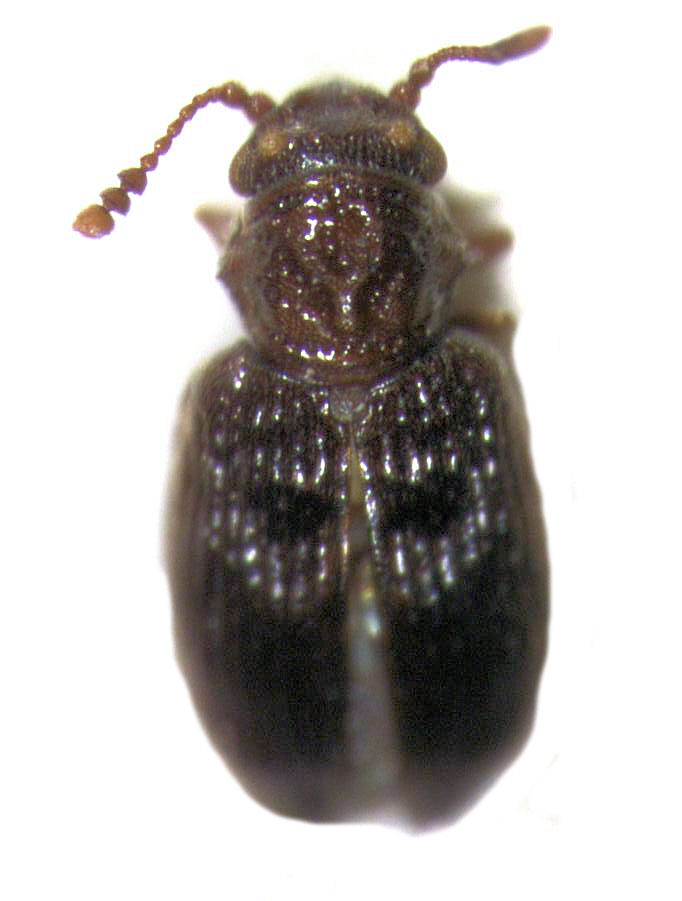
- Nothoderodontus gourlayi

Scientific classification
- Domain: Eukaryota
- Kingdom: Animalia
- Phylum: Arthropoda
- Class: Insecta
- Order: Coleoptera
- Suborder: Polyphaga
- Family: Derodontidae
- Genus: Nothoderodontus; Crowson, 1959

Species
- 6, see text

= Nothoderodontus =

Genus of beetles

Nothoderodontus is a genus of tooth-necked fungus beetles in the family Derodontidae. They are primarily associated with sooty molds, however specimens have been collected in other habitats, such as a new species that was discovered in flowers in New Zealand. There are six described species in Nothoderodontus. Species include:

- Nothoderodontus chilensis
- Nothoderodontus darlingtoni
- Nothoderodontus dentatus
- Nothoderodontus gourlayi
- Nothoderodontus newtonorum
- Nothoderodontus watti
