= Sasajiscymnus lancetapicalis =

Scientific classification
- Kingdom: Animalia
- Phylum: Arthropoda
- Clade: Pancrustacea
- Class: Insecta
- Order: Coleoptera
- Suborder: Polyphaga
- Infraorder: Cucujiformia
- Family: Coccinellidae
- Genus: Sasajiscymnus
- Species: S. lancetapicalis

Binomial name
- Sasajiscymnus lancetapicalis (Pang & Gordon, 1986)

Synonyms
- Nephus lancetapicalis Pang & Gordon, 1986

Species of beetle

Sasajiscymnus lancetapicalis is a species of beetle of the family Coccinellidae. It is found in China (Guangdong).

== Description ==
Adults reach a length of about 1.6–1.7 mm. Adults have a pale yellow head and pronotum. The elytron is dark brown with a yellow basal margin and apical one-sixth.
