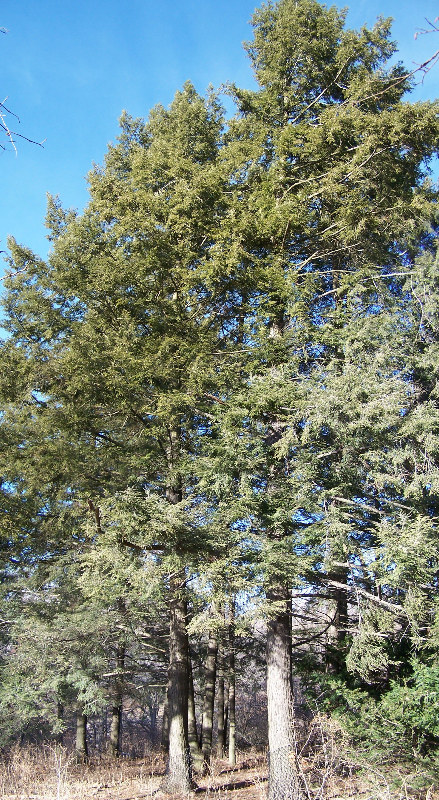
- Large specimens at Morton Arboretum

Conservation status
- Near Threatened (IUCN 3.1)

- Apparently Secure (NatureServe)

Scientific classification
- Kingdom: Plantae
- Clade: Tracheophytes
- Clade: Gymnosperms
- Division: Pinophyta
- Class: Pinopsida
- Order: Pinales
- Family: Pinaceae
- Genus: Tsuga
- Species: T. canadensis

Binomial name
- Tsuga canadensis (L.) Carrière
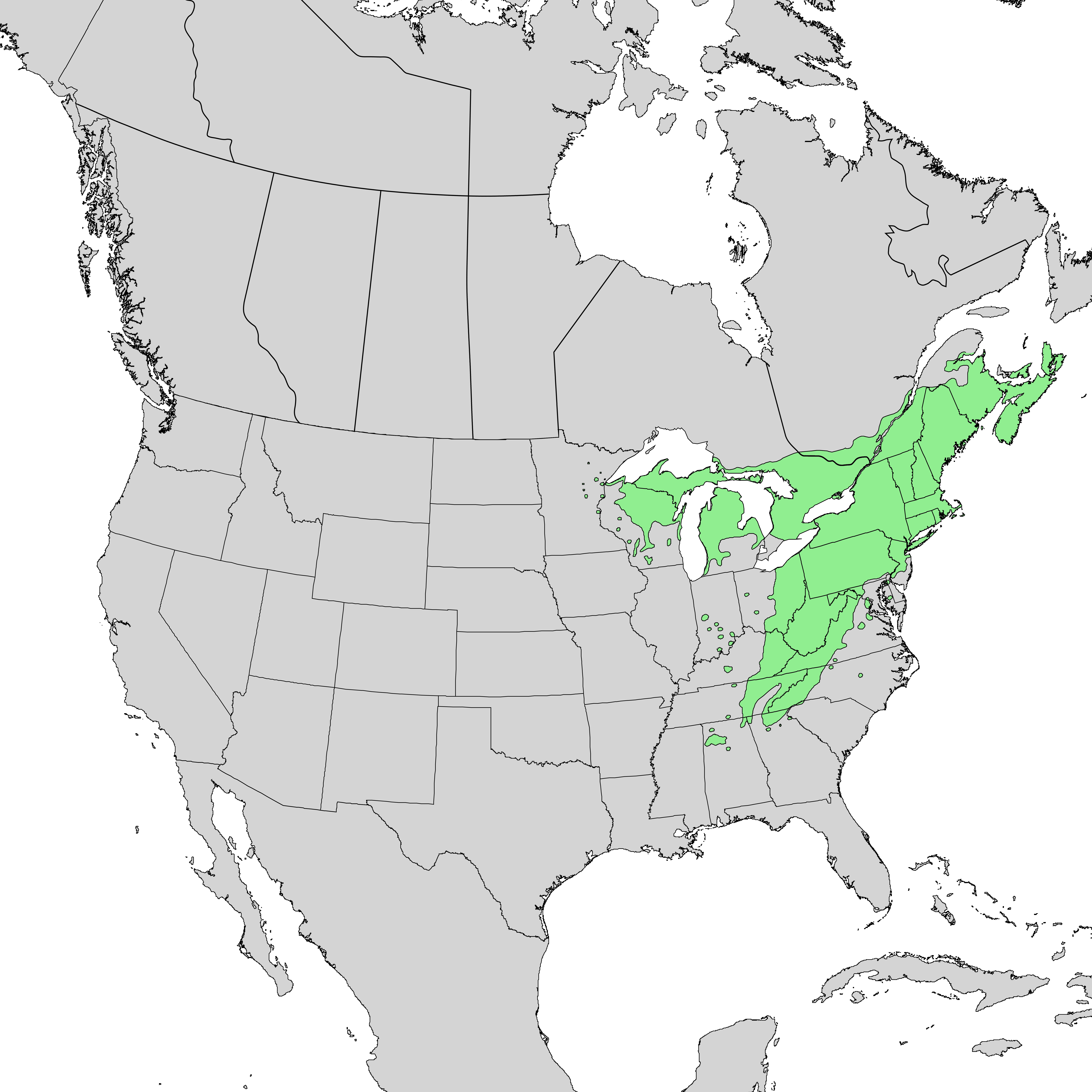
- Natural range
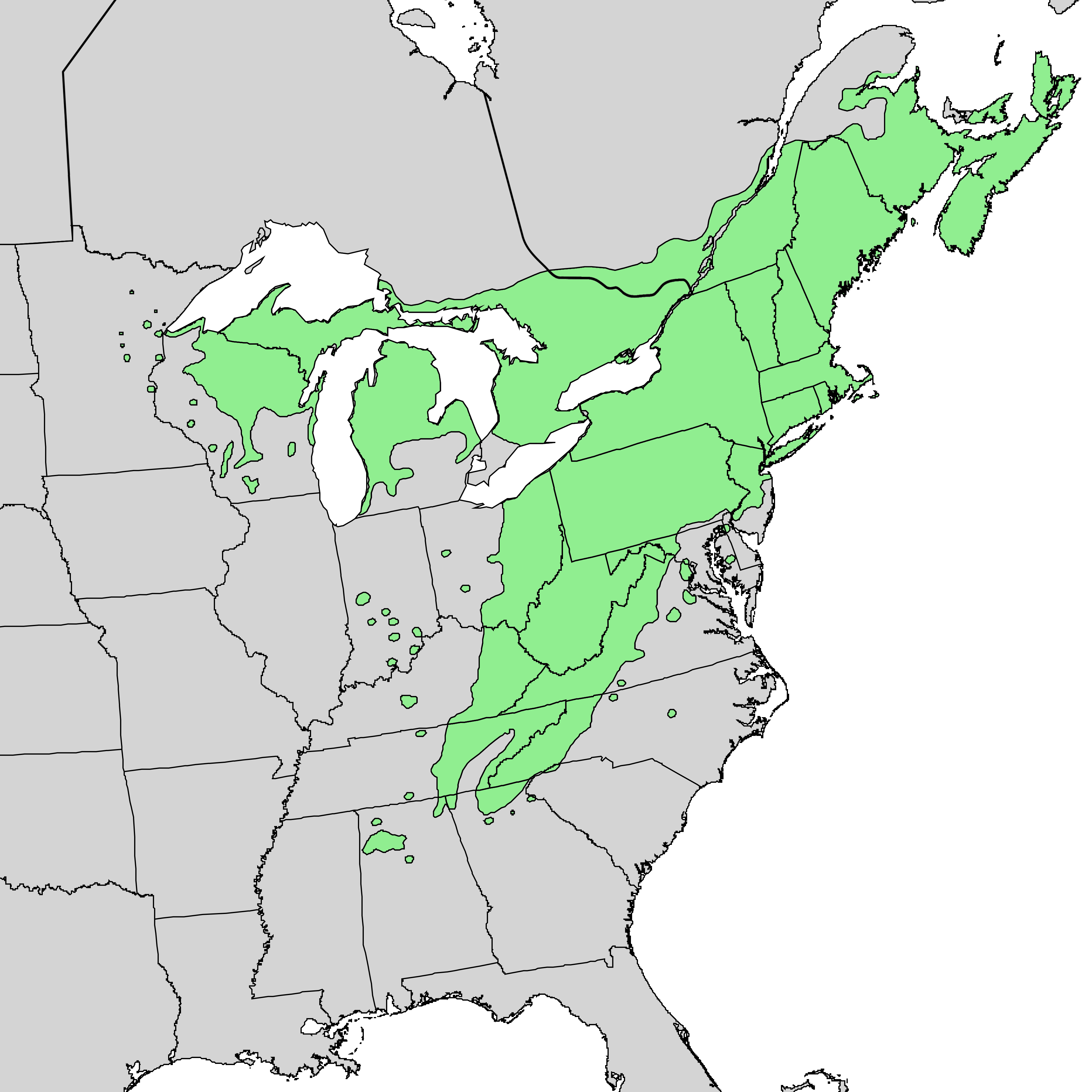
- Closeup view of range

= Tsuga canadensis =

Species of conifer

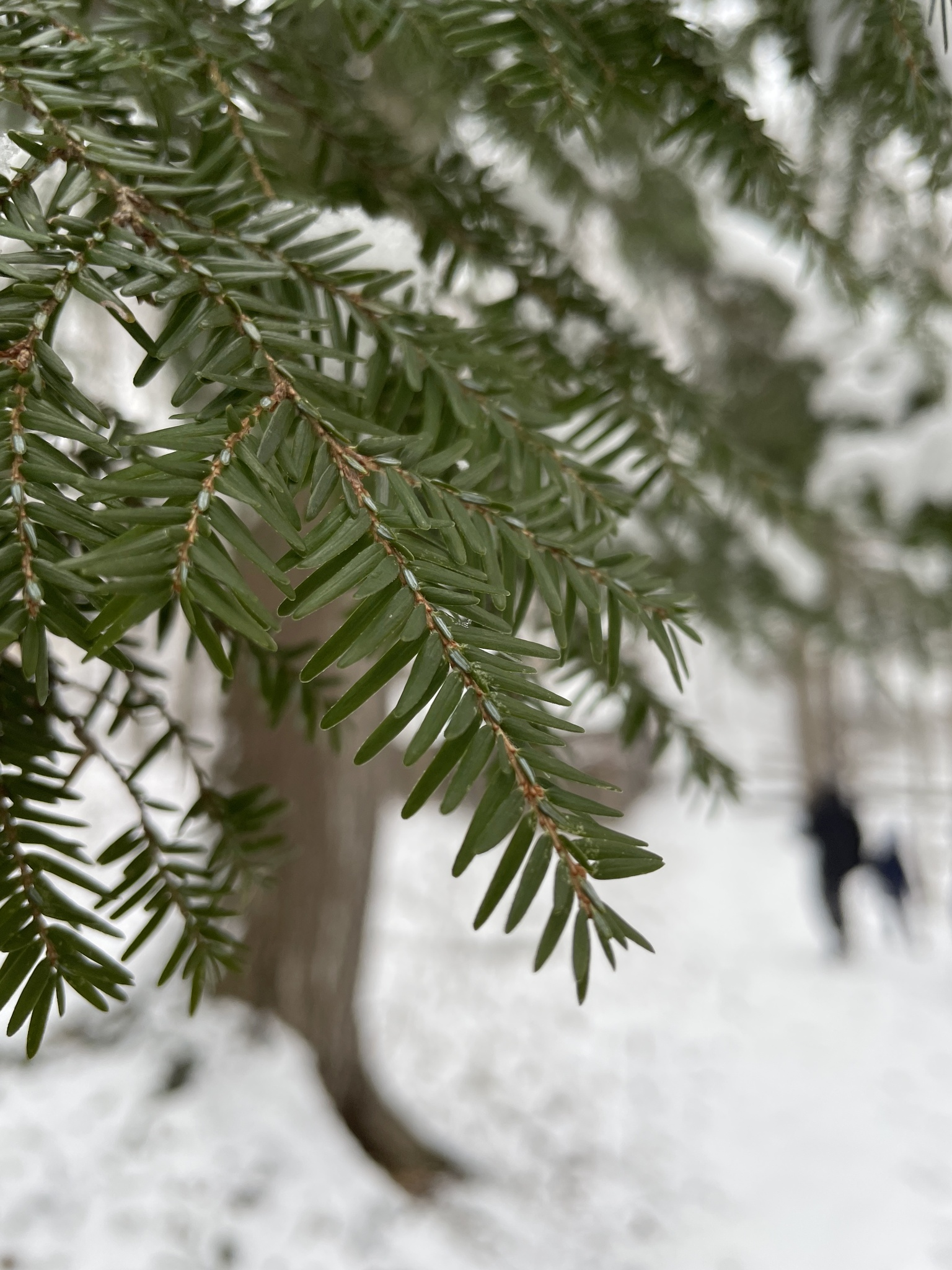
An eastern hemlock branch at the Kortright Centre for Conservation.

Tsuga canadensis, also known as Canadian hemlock, eastern hemlock-spruce, or eastern hemlock, and in the French-speaking regions of Canada as pruche du Canada, is a coniferous tree in the pine family, Pinaceae, native to eastern North America. It is the state tree of Pennsylvania. Eastern hemlocks are widespread throughout much of the Great Lakes region, the Appalachian Mountains, The Maritimes and the Northeastern United States. They have been introduced in the United Kingdom and mainland Europe, where they are used as ornamental trees.

Eastern hemlock populations in North America are threatened in much of their range by the spread of the invasive Hemlock woolly adelgid, which infests and eventually kills trees. Declines in population from hemlock wooly adelgid infestation have led to Tsuga canadensis being listed as Near Threatened on the IUCN Red List.

Eastern hemlocks are long lived trees, with many examples living for more than 500 years. They can grow to heights of more than 30 metres (100 ft), and are tolerant of shade, moist soil, and slopes. Hemlock wood is used in construction, and for railroad ties. Historically its bark was an important source of tannin for the leather tanning industry. Eastern hemlocks are popular as ornamental trees, thanks to their tolerance of a wide variety of soil and light conditions, as well as their characteristic drooping branches of the mutated tree known as 'weeping hemlock'.

== Description ==
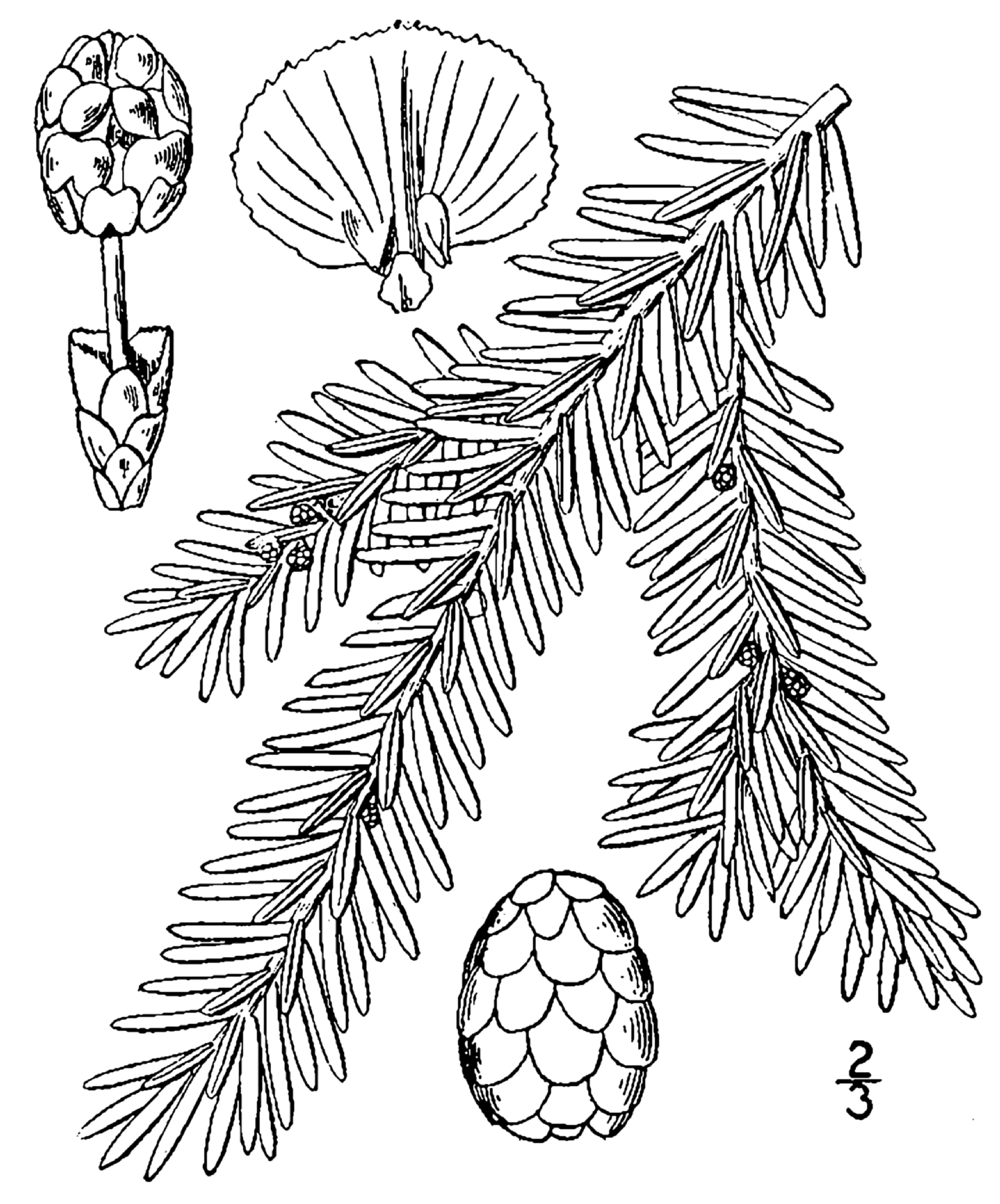
A line drawing of the leaves and cones from Britton and Brown's 1913 Illustrated flora of the northern states and Canada

The eastern hemlock grows well in shade and is very long lived, with the oldest recorded specimen, found in Tionesta, Pennsylvania, being at least 554 years old. The tree generally reaches heights of about 31 m (102 ft), but exceptional trees have been recorded up to 53 m (174 ft). The diameter of the trunk at breast height is often 1.5 m (4 ft 11 in), but again, outstanding trees have been recorded up to 1.75 m (5 ft 9 in). The trunk is usually straight and monopodial, but very rarely is forked. The crown is broadly conic, while the brownish bark is scaly and deeply fissured, especially with age. The twigs are a yellow-brown in color with darker red-brown pulvini, and are densely pubescent. The buds are ovoid in shape and are very small, measuring only 1.5 to 2.5 mm (0 to 1/8 in) in length. These are usually not resinous, but may be slightly so.

The leaves are typically 15 to 20 mm (0.59 to 0.79 in) in length, but may be as short as 5 mm (0.20 in) or as long as 25 mm (1 in).The leaves are arranged on little stalks, a characteristic that does not appear in the other evergreen trees. They are flattened and are typically distichous, or two-ranked. The bottom of the leaf is glaucous with two broad and clearly visible stomatal bands, while the top is a shiny green to yellow-green in color. The leaf margins are very slightly toothed, especially near the apex. The seed cones are ovoid in shape and typically measure 1.5 to 2.5 cm (5/8 to 1 in) in length and 1.0 to 1.5 cm (3/8 to 5/8 in) in width. The scales are ovate to cuneate in shape and measure 8 to 12 mm (3/8 to 1/2 in) in length by 7.0 to 10 mm (1/4 to 3/8 in) in width. The apex is more or less rounded and is often projected outward. Twenty-four diploid chromosomes are present within the trees' DNA.

=== Wood ===
The wood is soft, coarse-grained, and light buff in color. Air-dried, a cubic foot (0.028 m^{3}) weighs 28 pounds (13 kg). The lumber is used for general construction and crates. Because of its unusual power of holding spikes, it is also used for railroad ties. Untreated, the wood is not durable if exposed to the elements. As a fuel, it is low in value. The wood is also a source of pulp for paper manufacturing.

== Distribution and habitat ==
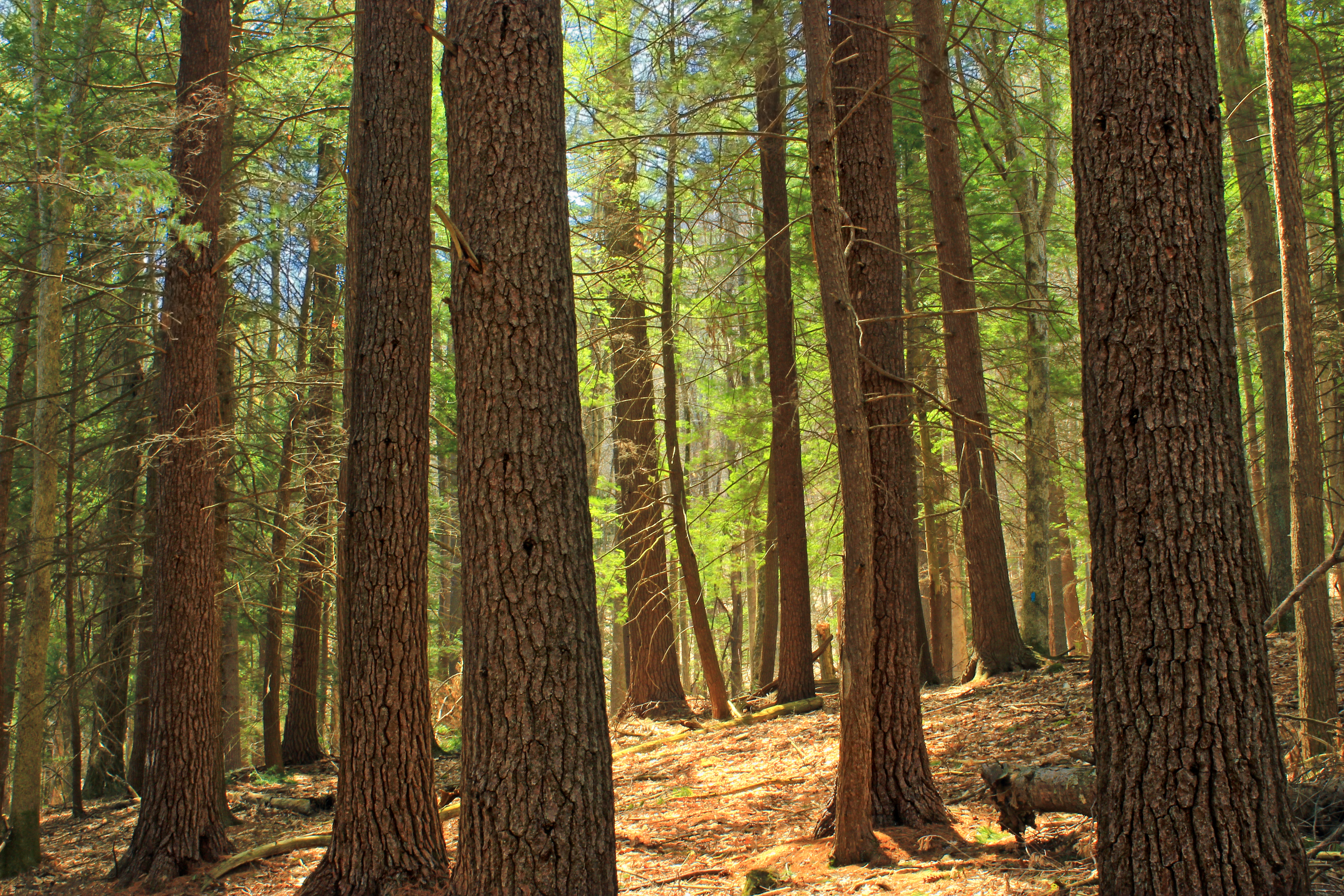
Stand of eastern hemlock and eastern white pine in Tiadaghton State Forest, Pennsylvania; note the hemlocks' deeply fissured bark

T. canadensis occurs at sea level in the north of its distribution, but is found primarily at elevations of 600–1,800 m (2,000–5,900 ft). It ranges from northeastern Minnesota eastward through southern Quebec and into Nova Scotia, and south in the Appalachian Mountains to northern Georgia and Alabama. Disjunct populations occur in the Piedmont region, northern Alabama, western Ohio and into Indiana, as well as western Wisconsin and eastern Minnesota. In Canada, it is present in Ontario and all provinces to the east except Newfoundland and Labrador. Its range completely overlaps that of the closely related Tsuga caroliniana.

It is found primarily on rocky ridges, ravines, and hillsides with relatively high levels of moisture.

=== Climate ===
Eastern hemlock is generally confined to areas with highland climates, with cool and humid conditions. Precipitation in the areas where it grows is typically 740 mm (29 in) to more than 1,270 mm (50 in) per year. The lower number is more typical of northern forests that receive heavy snowfall; the higher number is common in southerly areas with high summer rainfall. Near the Atlantic coast and in the southern Appalachians where the trees often reach their greatest heights, annual rainfall often exceeds 1,520 mm (60 in). In the north of its range, the temperatures in January average −12 °C (10 °F), while in July they average only 16 °C (61 °F). In these areas, the frost-free season can last fewer than 80 days. In contrast, the southern end of the range experiences up to 200 days without frost and January temperatures as high as 6 °C (43 °F).

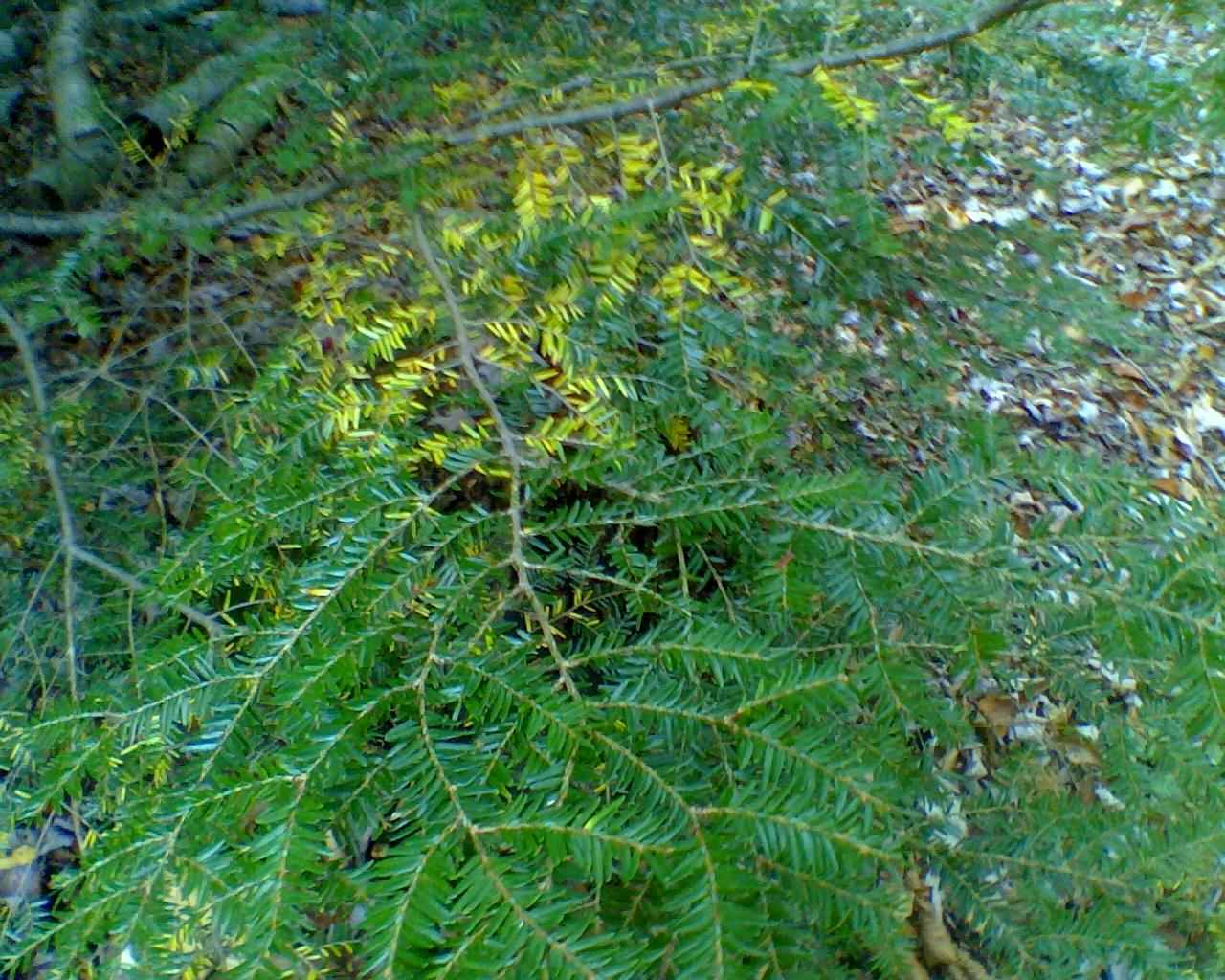
Hemlock boughs in the autumn, shedding older foliage

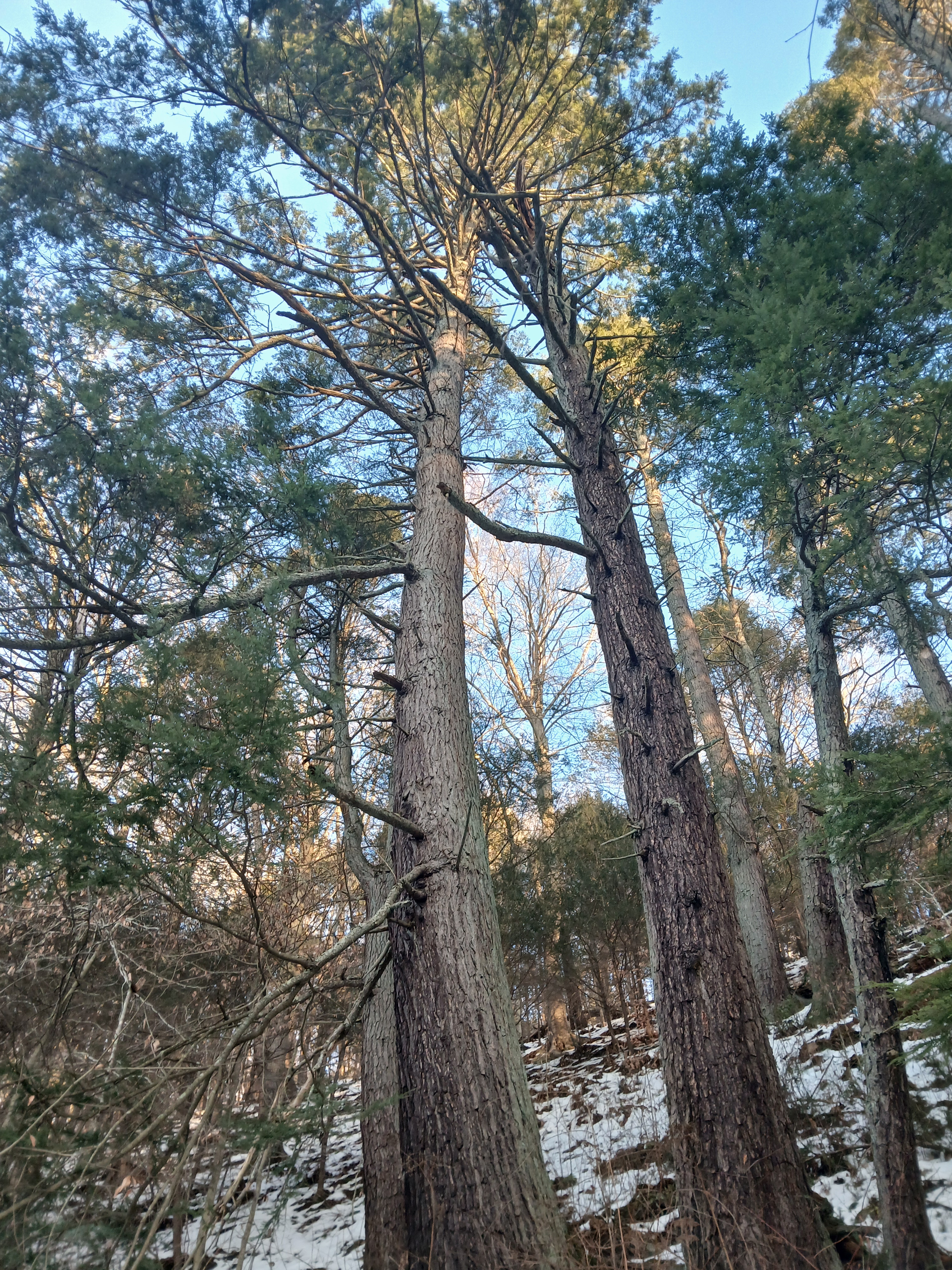
Old hemlocks, Fairfax County, VA

== Hemlock woolly adelgid ==
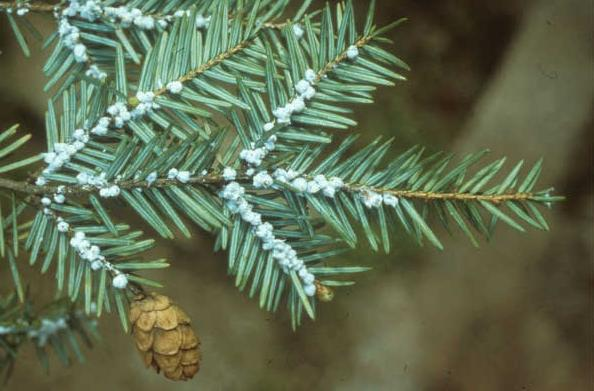
Shoot infested with hemlock woolly adelgid

The species is currently threatened by the hemlock woolly adelgid (Adelges tsugae), a sap-sucking bug introduced from East Asia to the United States in 1924, and first found in the native range of eastern hemlock in the late 1960s. The adelgid has spread very rapidly in southern parts of the range once becoming established, while its expansion northward is much slower. Virtually all the hemlocks in the southern Appalachian Mountains have seen infestations of the insect within the last five to seven years, with thousands of hectares of stands dying within the last two to three years. Attempts to save representative examples on both public and private lands are on-going. A project named "Tsuga Search", funded by the Great Smoky Mountains National Park, is being conducted to save the largest and tallest remaining eastern hemlocks in the Park. Through Tsuga Search, hemlocks have been found with trunk volumes up to 44.8 m^{3} within the park, making it the largest eastern evergreen conifer, eclipsing in volume both eastern white pine (Pinus strobus) and loblolly pine (Pinus taeda). The tree is currently listed as a near threatened species in the IUCN Red List, but this is based largely on its wide distribution and because the adelgid populations have not reached the northern areas of its range. In 2018, Kejimkujik National Park, in Nova Scotia, became the first National Park of Canada to detect hemlock woolly adelgid within its boundaries. Since then, park staff have been implementing active management options to preserve several hemlock stands within the park.

A study in 2009 conducted by scientists with the U.S. Forest Service Southern Research Station suggests the hemlock woolly adelgid is killing hemlock trees faster than expected in the southern Appalachians, and rapidly altering the carbon cycle of these forests. According to Science Daily, the pest could kill most of the region's hemlock trees within the next decade. According to the study, researchers found "hemlock woolly adelgid infestation is rapidly impacting the carbon cycle in [hemlock] tree stands," and "adelgid-infested hemlock trees in the South are declining much faster than the reported 9-year decline of some infested hemlock trees in the Northeast."

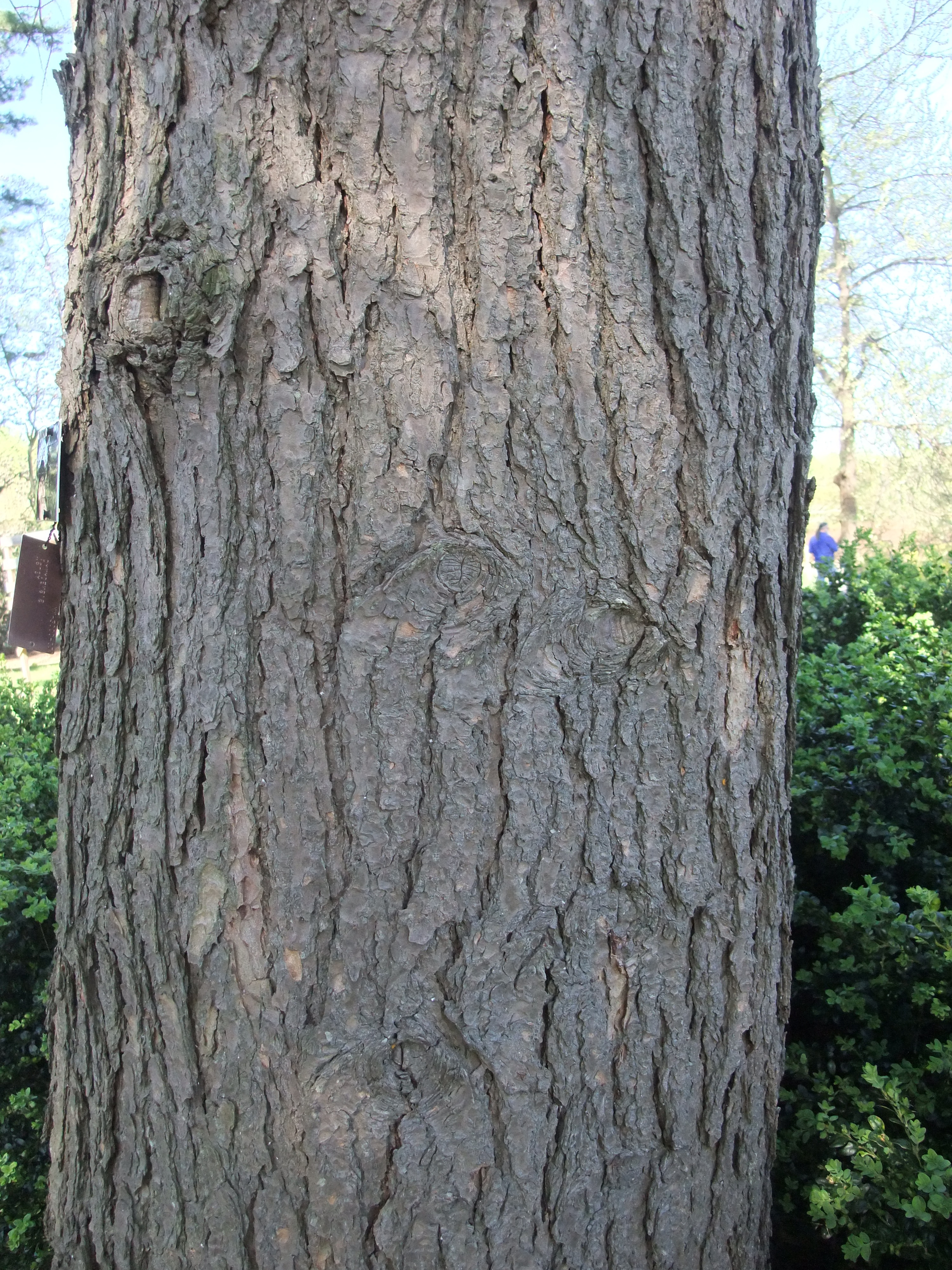
Closeup of bark

In a 2009 case study, entomologists from the U.S. Forest Service, Cornell University, and the University of Massachusetts-Amherst released 900 Laricobius nigrinus beetles into a stand of adelgid-infested hemlocks near Lansing, New York. L. nigrinus, which is native to the Pacific Northwest, naturally preys on the hemlock wooly adelgid. The particular site near Lansing was chosen because its hemlocks are only lightly infested with the woolly adelgid, and enough trees are found to sustain a long-term study. The site will be left untreated with pesticides for 10 years to study how well the L. nigrinus beetles become established; if the experiment proves successful, researchers expect the population will take two to three years to build to levels where they can be readily detected.

== Ecology ==
The tree can be found living in association with many forest mushrooms, such as Ramaria flavosaponaria and Ganoderma tsugae (which has the common name hemlock varnish shelf.)

== Paleoecology ==
The mid-Holocene decline of hemlock populations is a much-studied phenomenon. From its foundation in the early Holocene (around 16,000 BP) in what is now the southeastern US, T. canadensis expanded rapidly and successfully into its potential range. However, palynological analyses show the hemlock population experienced a pronounced decline approximately 5,500 BP that lasted for about 1,000 years. Continued research points to other, though less dramatic, dips in Holocene hemlock populations. Pathogens, insects, and climatic change, and a combination of these, have all been proposed to explain these anomalies. The eastern hemlock increased again after the major decline, but did not recover its former place as a dominant species.

== Exceptional trees ==
Due to it being a long-lived tree, several very large or otherwise impressive trees exist along the east coast of North America. One organization, the Eastern Native Tree Society (ENTS), has been particularly active in discovering and measuring these trees. In the southern Appalachians, many individuals reach 45 metres (148 ft) tall, and one tree has been measured in the Great Smoky Mountains National Park to 52.8 m (173 ft 3 in) tall, though this tree is now dead from hemlock woolly adelgids; the tallest now surviving, the "Noland Mountain tree", is 51.8 m (169 ft 11 in) tall. Altogether, ENTS has confirmed four trees to heights of 51 m (167 ft) or more by climb and tape drop. In the Northeast, the tallest accurately measured tree is 44 m (144 ft). This tree, named the Seneca hemlock, grows in Cook Forest State Park, PA. Above 43°N latitude, the maximum height of the species is less, under 39 m (128 ft). In New England, ENTS has measured hemlocks to 42 m (138 ft), although trees above 39 m (128 ft) are extremely rare in New England. By 44°N, the maximum height is probably not more than 35 m (115 ft). Diameters of mature hemlocks range from 0.75–1.8 m (2 ft 6 in – 5 ft 11 in), with trees over 1.6 m (5 ft 3 in) in diameter being very rare. In New England, the maximum diameter is 1.4 m (4 ft 7 in).

Trunk volume is the third dimension to receive attention by ENTS. Many eastern hemlocks have been modeled to over 30 m^{3} (1,100 cu ft) trunk volume, and the largest has been calculated to be 44.8 m^{3} (1,580 cu ft), making it the largest natural evergreen conifer in the eastern United States. The center of maximum size development for the species is the southern Appalachians, especially the Great Smoky Mountains.

== Cultivation ==
Tsuga canadensis has long been a popular tree in cultivation. The tree's preference for partial shade and tolerance of full shade allows it to be planted in areas where other conifers would not easily grow. In addition, its very fine-textured foliage that droops to the ground, its pyramidal growth habit, and its ability to withstand hard pruning make it a desirable ornamental tree. In cultivation, it prefers sites that are slightly acidic to neutral with nutrient-rich and moist but well-drained soil. It is most often used as a specimen, for a screen, or in small group plantings, though it can also be trained as a dense formal hedge. It should not be used on roadsides where salt is used in winter, as its foliage is sensitive to salt spray. It is also poorly adapted as a windbreak tree, as wind exposure causes dieback in winter. It has several drawbacks, such as a fairly low tolerance of urban stress, intolerance for very wet or very dry soils, and susceptibility to attack by the hemlock woolly adelgid, though this is treatable. Its tendency to shed needles rapidly after being cut down renders it unsuitable as a Christmas tree.

It was introduced to British gardens in 1736. In the UK, it is encountered frequently in gardens both large and small, as well as some parks, and is most common in the eastern areas of the country. It is sometimes employed as a hedge, but is considered inferior for this usage compared to Tsuga heterophylla (western hemlock); it is not well adapted to the UK climate and as a consequence often has a poorly developed, forked and sinuous trunk there. In Germany, it is the most frequently seen hemlock in cultivation, and is also used in forestry.

=== Cultivars ===
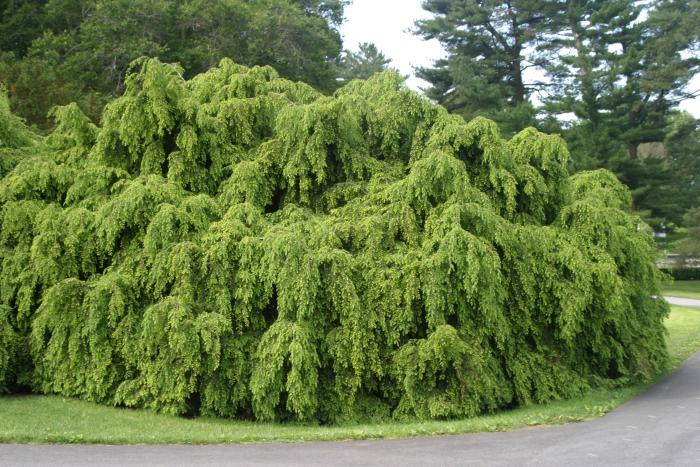
The weeping shrub form T. canadensis 'Sargentii'

Over 300 cultivars have been selected for use, many of them being dwarf forms and shrubs. A partial list of popular cultivars includes:

- 'Beehive' – a very small dwarf shrub typically growing to 1 m (3 ft 3 in) high and 1.5 m wide, resembling a spreading beehive in form
- 'Bennett' – a dwarf shrub reaching 1 m (3 ft 3 in) high and 1.5 m (4 ft 11 in) wide, with upper branchlets that first ascend and then arch upper, this selection prefers partial shade.
- 'Cole's Prostrate' – a groundcover form that can also be used in bonsai as an alternative to the prostrate junipers, it slowly grows to only 30 cm (12 in) tall with a 1.3-metre (4.3 ft) spread, with the central stems eventually becoming visible. It also prefers partial shade.
- 'Gentsch White' – a dwarf shrub growing to 1.3 m (4 ft 3 in) tall with an equal spread and new spring growth that turns creamy-white in autumn through winter, creating a dramatic contrast with the dark green old growth, it is easily scorched by the sun and requires partial shade. It is recommend to feather shear annually to keep it compact and create more tip growth.
- 'Jeddeloh' – a dwarf shrub reaching to 1 m (3 ft 3 in) high and 1.5 m (4 ft 11 in) wide, showing a small concavity in the centre, it is an alternative to the bird's-nest spruce (Picea abies 'Nidiformis'). This cultivar has gained the Royal Horticultural Society's Award of Garden Merit.
- 'Pendula' – an upright weeping form whose height is dependent on how long it is staked, but is typically seen 0.6–1.5 m (2 ft 0 in – 4 ft 11 in) tall with a 1.5-metre (4.9 ft) spread. It has also won the AGM.
- 'Sargentii' – a popular large weeping shrub that grows to 3 m (9.8 ft) tall with a wide spread up to 6 m (20 ft), it features numerous pendulous branches and is most effectively employed near water, in rock gardens, or on embankments.

== Uses ==
American pioneers made tea from the tree's leafy twigs and used its branches as brooms. Tea can be made from the needles. The inner bark, which is best in winter and coming into spring, can be eaten raw or boiled; it can also be used to make flour.

== In popular culture ==
- Numerous place names in North America are named Hemlock. For a list, see Hemlock.
- Hemlocks are a recurring image in the novel Ethan Frome. Author Edith Wharton described "hemlock boughs bent inward to their trunks by the weight of the snow," "intensely blue shadows of hemlocks on sunlit snow," and darkness "dropping down like a black veil from the heavy hemlock boughs."
