= Sasajiscymnus =

Scientific classification
- Kingdom: Animalia
- Phylum: Arthropoda
- Clade: Pancrustacea
- Class: Insecta
- Order: Coleoptera
- Suborder: Polyphaga
- Infraorder: Cucujiformia
- Family: Coccinellidae
- Tribe: Coccidulini
- Genus: Sasajiscymnus; Vandenberg, 2004

Synonyms
- Pseudoscymnus Chapin, 1962 (preocc.)

Genus of beetles

Sasajiscymnus is a genus of lady beetles in the family Coccinellidae.

== Species ==
- Sasajiscymnus acutus
- Sasajiscymnus amplus
- Sasajiscymnus anchorus
- Sasajiscymnus ancistroides
- Sasajiscymnus anmashanus
- Sasajiscymnus anomalus
- Sasajiscymnus applanatus
- Sasajiscymnus atypicus
- Sasajiscymnus aureus
- Sasajiscymnus bielawskii
- Sasajiscymnus bivalvis
- Sasajiscymnus changi
- Sasajiscymnus cultratus
- Sasajiscymnus cuonaicus
- Sasajiscymnus curvatus
- Sasajiscymnus dapae
- Sasajiscymnus disselasmatus
- Sasajiscymnus dwipakalpa
- Sasajiscymnus erinaceus
- Sasajiscymnus falcatus
- Sasajiscymnus flavostictus
- Sasajiscymnus flexus
- Sasajiscymnus fulvihumerus
- Sasajiscymnus funerarius
- Sasajiscymnus fuscus
- Sasajiscymnus fusinus
- Sasajiscymnus gibbosus
- Sasajiscymnus gressitti
- Sasajiscymnus guniujiang
- Sasajiscymnus hamatus
- Sasajiscymnus hanoiensis
- Sasajiscymnus hareja
- Sasajiscymnus heijia
- Sasajiscymnus hosonaga
- Sasajiscymnus intricatus
- Sasajiscymnus jenai
- Sasajiscymnus kuriharai
- Sasajiscymnus kurohime
- Sasajiscymnus lamellatus
- Sasajiscymnus lanceolatus
- Sasajiscymnus lancetapicalis
- Sasajiscymnus langsonensis
- Sasajiscymnus latus
- Sasajiscymnus lewisi
- Sasajiscymnus lishanicus
- Sasajiscymnus longisiphonulus
- Sasajiscymnus longus
- Sasajiscymnus luteoniger
- Sasajiscymnus luteus
- Sasajiscymnus maculatus
- Sasajiscymnus montanus
- Sasajiscymnus murreensis
- Sasajiscymnus nagasakiensis
- Sasajiscymnus nakanei
- Sasajiscymnus nepalicus
- Sasajiscymnus niganulus
- Sasajiscymnus nigritus
- Sasajiscymnus nirvana
- Sasajiscymnus obliquus
- Sasajiscymnus ocellatus
- Sasajiscymnus ocelliferus
- Sasajiscymnus ohtai
- Sasajiscymnus ohtsukai
- Sasajiscymnus orbiculatus
- Sasajiscymnus pallidicollis
- Sasajiscymnus paltatus
- Sasajiscymnus parallelus
- Sasajiscymnus parenthesis
- Sasajiscymnus perpusillus
- Sasajiscymnus pilicrepus
- Sasajiscymnus pronotus
- Sasajiscymnus pseudoamplus
- Sasajiscymnus quinquepunctatus
- Sasajiscymnus robustus
- Sasajiscymnus sagittalis
- Sasajiscymnus samuelsoni
- Sasajiscymnus seboshii
- Sasajiscymnus seminigrinus
- Sasajiscymnus shixingiensis
- Sasajiscymnus silfverbergi
- Sasajiscymnus simmondsi
- Sasajiscymnus striatus
- Sasajiscymnus subulatus
- Sasajiscymnus sylvaticus
- Sasajiscymnus tainanensis
- Sasajiscymnus truncatulus
- Sasajiscymnus tsugae
- Sasajiscymnus tumidus
- Sasajiscymnus variabilis
- Sasajiscymnus wuliangshan
