= Sasajiscymnus kuriharai =

Scientific classification
- Kingdom: Animalia
- Phylum: Arthropoda
- Clade: Pancrustacea
- Class: Insecta
- Order: Coleoptera
- Suborder: Polyphaga
- Infraorder: Cucujiformia
- Family: Coccinellidae
- Genus: Sasajiscymnus
- Species: S. kuriharai

Binomial name
- Sasajiscymnus kuriharai (Miyatake, 1959)

Synonyms
- Scymnus (Scymnus) kurohime Miyatake, 1959

Species of beetle

Sasajiscymnus kuriharai is a species of beetle of the family Coccinellidae. It is found in Japan and China (Fujian, Yunnan).

== Description ==
Adults reach a length of about 1.7–2.2 mm. Adults have a black head. The pronotum is black with a brown anterior margin and anterolateral angle. The elytron is black with a brownish apical margin.
