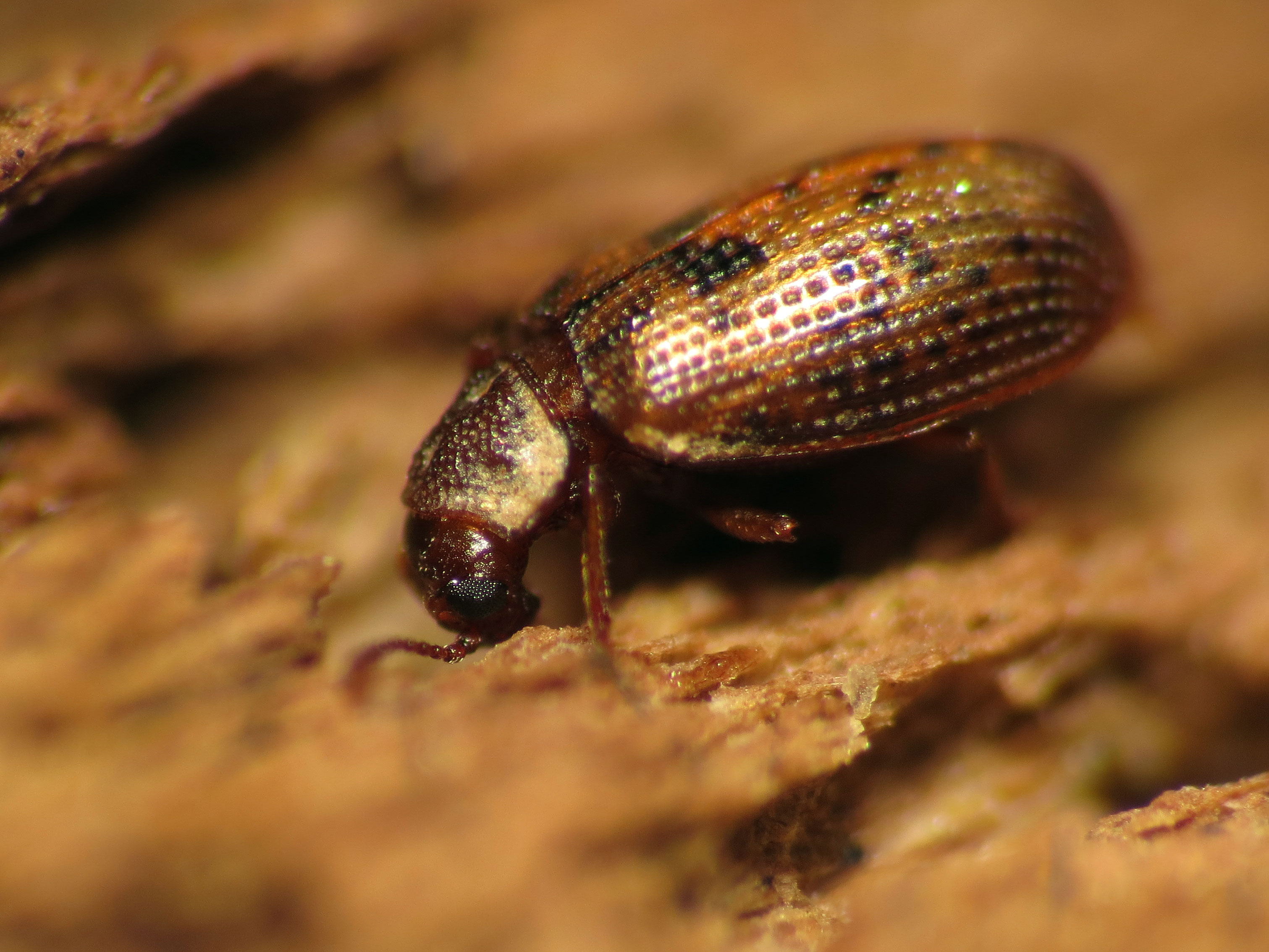
- Derodontus esotericus

Scientific classification
- Kingdom: Animalia
- Phylum: Arthropoda
- Clade: Pancrustacea
- Class: Insecta
- Order: Coleoptera
- Suborder: Polyphaga
- Family: Derodontidae
- Genus: Derodontus; LeConte, 1861

Synonyms
- Mycetomychus Frivaldszky, 1865

= Derodontus =

Genus of beetles

Derodontus is a genus of tooth-necked fungus beetles in the family Derodontidae. There are about eleven described species in Derodontus.

== Species ==
These eleven species belong to the genus Derodontus:

- Derodontus esotericus Lawrence, 1979
- Derodontus japonicus Hisamatsu, 1964
- Derodontus longiclavis Nikitskiy, 1987
- Derodontus macularis (Fuss, 1850)
- Derodontus maculatus (Melsheimer, 1844)
- Derodontus nepalensis Háva 2009
- Derodontus ossetious Nikitsky, 1993
- Derodontus raffrayi Grouvelle, 1917
- Derodontus trisignatus (Mannerheim, 1852)
- Derodontus tuberosus Hisamatsu & Sakai, 1986
- Derodontus unidentatus Lawrence, 1979
