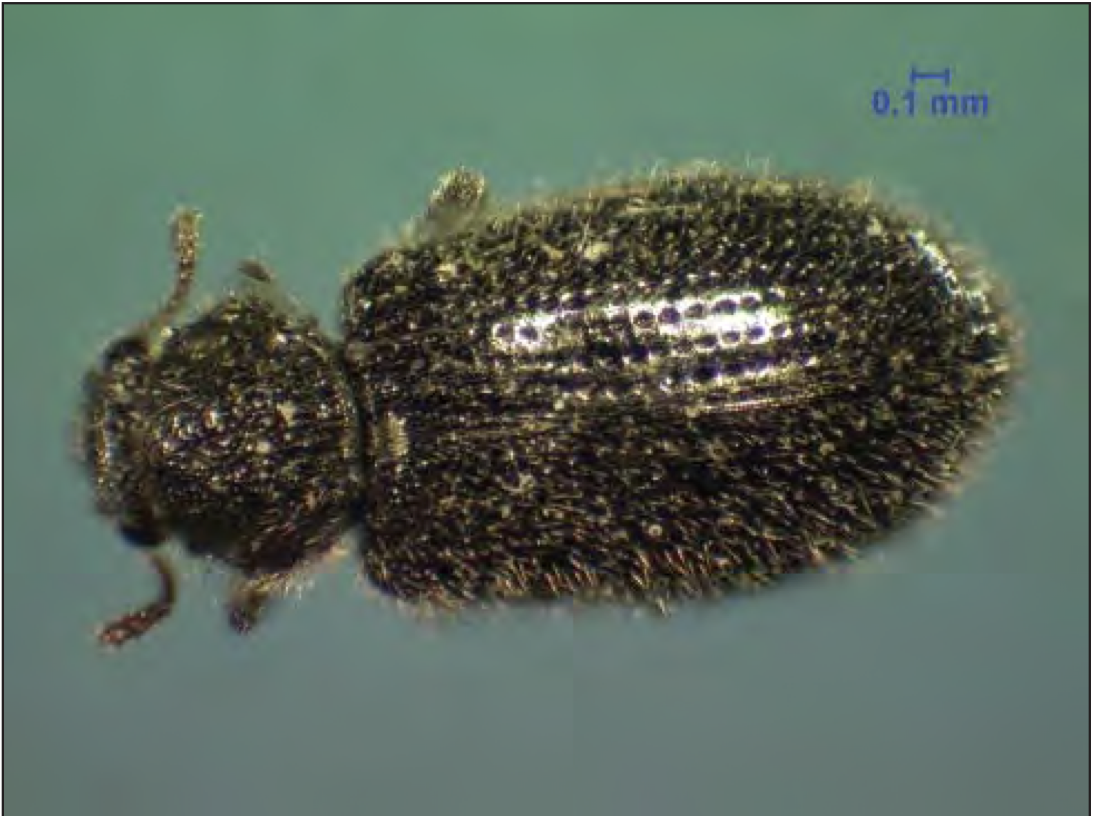

Scientific classification
- Kingdom: Animalia
- Phylum: Arthropoda
- Clade: Pancrustacea
- Class: Insecta
- Order: Coleoptera
- Suborder: Polyphaga
- Family: Derodontidae
- Genus: Laricobius
- Species: L. nigrinus

Binomial name
- Laricobius nigrinus Fender, 1945

= Laricobius nigrinus =

Species of beetle

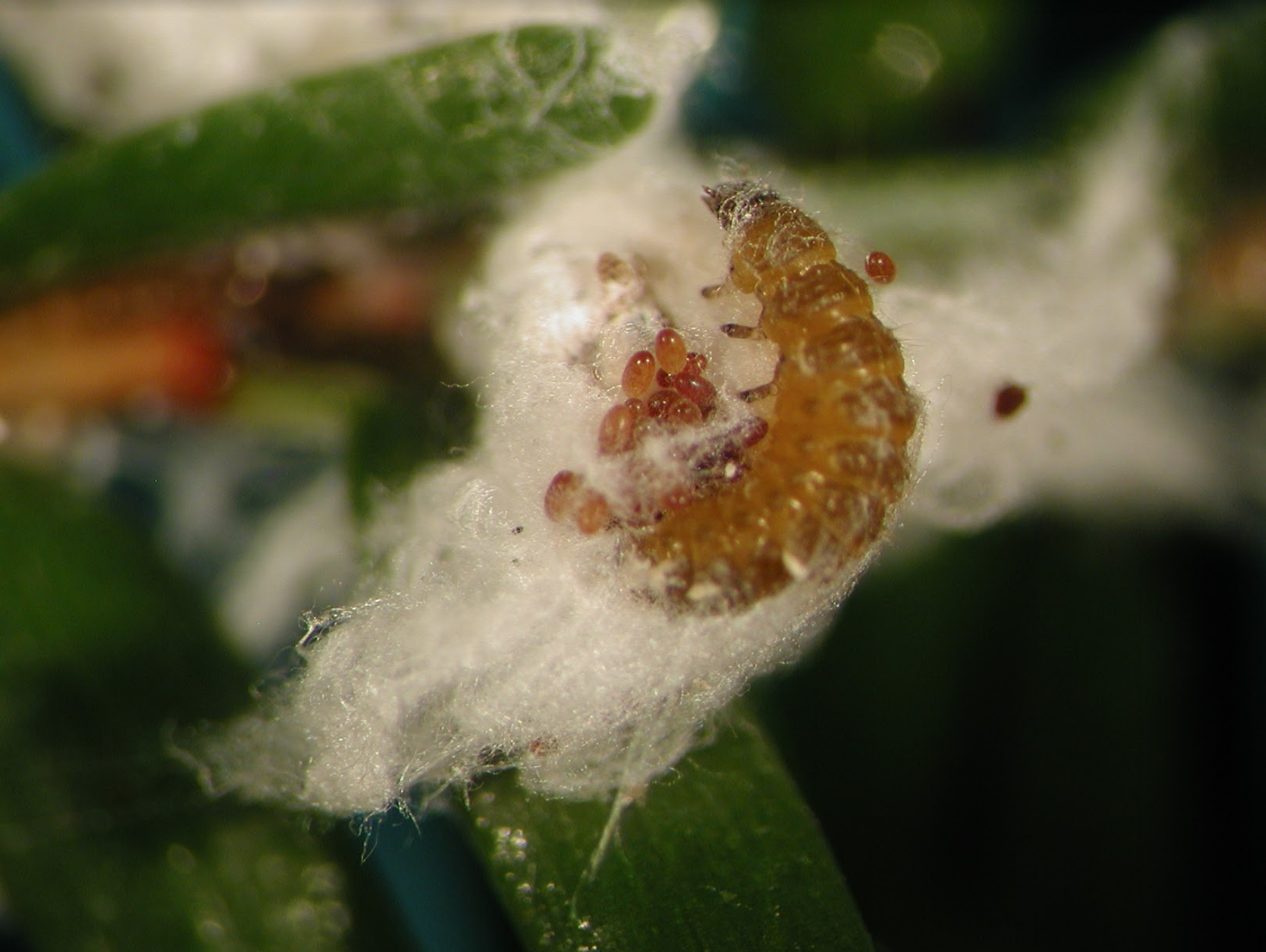
L. nigrinus larva feeding in an A. tsugae ovisac

Laricobius nigrinus is a species of tooth-necked fungus beetle in the family Derodontidae. It is native to western North America, and it is being studied as a biological control agent for the hemlock woolly adelgid. It was first released in 2003 and continues to be reared and released across the Northeast to control infestations.

== Taxonomy ==
Laricobius nigrinus was first described by Kenneth Fender in 1945 from specimens collected in Oregon. Laricobius is one of four genera in Derodontidae. The genus has a Holarctic distribution, with most species native to Asia.

== Description ==
Adult beetles have a black body, clubbed antennae with eleven segments, and two ocelli. Their palps, antennae, and tarsi are dark brown to red. The head is partially visible from above. They are usually 2.3–2.9 mm long, with no significant sex differences in size. The species can be distinguished from other black Laricobius by its toothed pronotal margin. Its eggs are yellow and oblong, usually laid in the ovisacs of A. tsugae. The larvae have three segmented antennae, a well-developed head with twelve stemmata and hairy abdominal segments. They are "oligopod type" larvae, with three pairs of thoracic legs, and no prolegs. The larvae start as yellow before darkening to yellow green/yellow brown with maturity. Pupae resemble the adult form, and individuals can be sexed in pupal form.

== Habitat, life cycle, and behavior ==
All members of Laricobius feed on members of Adelgidae, and Laricobius nigrinus is specialized on the hemlock woolly adelgid. The predatory life history of Laricobius is unique among the family as most derodontids are fungal feeders. L. nigrinus is native to hemlock forests in the Pacific Northwest. It can be found throughout the western U.S. and Canada, and specimens in the U.S. Museum of Natural History have been collected as far north as the southeastern Yukon. It has a univoltine life cycle, completing one generation per year. Eggs are laid in early spring, and its development is synchronized with the winter/spring generation of A. tsugae. Females lay an average of 100 eggs during their lifetimes. L. nigrinus goes through four larval instars, and the larvae use secretions to glue debris and adelgid wool to themselves as camouflage. Fourth instar larvae drop to the ground as prepupae and complete their development in the soil before emerging as adults in the fall. Similar to its prey, L. nigrinus is dormant during the summer months, aestivating as a pupa. The adult beetles feed on adult adelgids, while the larvae feed on the eggs of the spring progrediens generation. They have a temperature dependent development, and cannot complete development above 21 °C. They are significantly more active during the day than at night. Their flight behavior is responsive to prey densities, and they will only fly when their food source is scarce. They use scent to home in on adelgids at close range, and respond to the odors of the adelgid's native host tree, western hemlock as well as the odors of western white pine and white spruce.

== Biological control ==
Due to its narrow prey specificity and geographic range, L. nigrinus was approved by USDA-APHIS for release as a biological control agent in 2000. Field releases began in 2003, and populations have expanded to cover a wide range of A. tsugae infestation. As of 2021 it has been released in 18 states, and has established in Pennsylvania, Maryland, New York, New Jersey, Virginia, Georgia, West Virginia, North Carolina, Tennessee, Connecticut, Massachusetts, Maine, and New Hampshire. Releases are continuing throughout the infestation range. It has been shown to strongly impact A. tsugae densities in experiments conducted in their native range, and a recent study found that L. nigrinus has a significant impact on the mortality of A. tsugae eggs at caged release sites. Studies are ongoing to determine the rate of hybridization between L. nigrinus and its native congener, Laricobius rubidus which feeds on pine bark adelgid.

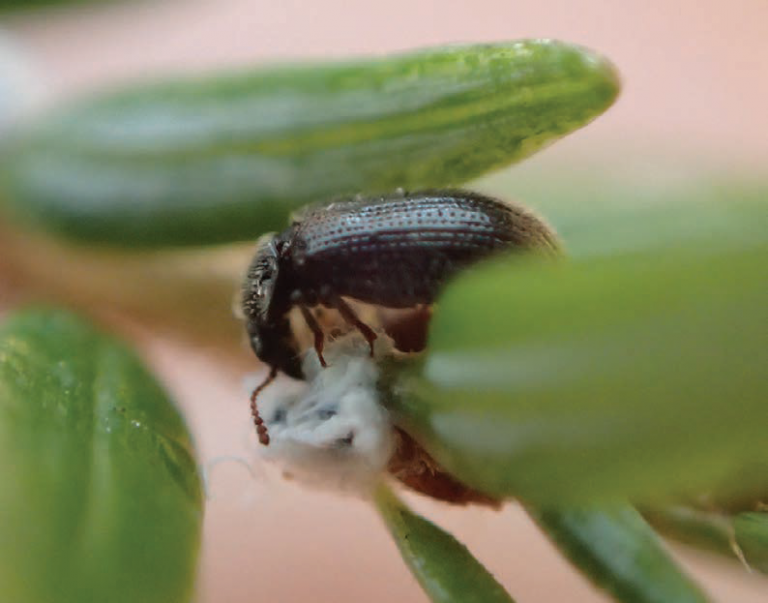
Adult L. nigrinus feeding on A. tsugae
