= Peltastica =

Scientific classification
- Domain: Eukaryota
- Kingdom: Animalia
- Phylum: Arthropoda
- Class: Insecta
- Order: Coleoptera
- Suborder: Polyphaga
- Family: Derodontidae
- Genus: Peltastica; Mannerheim, 1852

Species
- Peltastica tuberculata Peltastica amurensis

Genus of beetles

Peltastica is a genus of tooth-necked fungus beetles in the family Derodontidae. There are two described species in Peltastica, P. tuberculata and P. amurensis.
