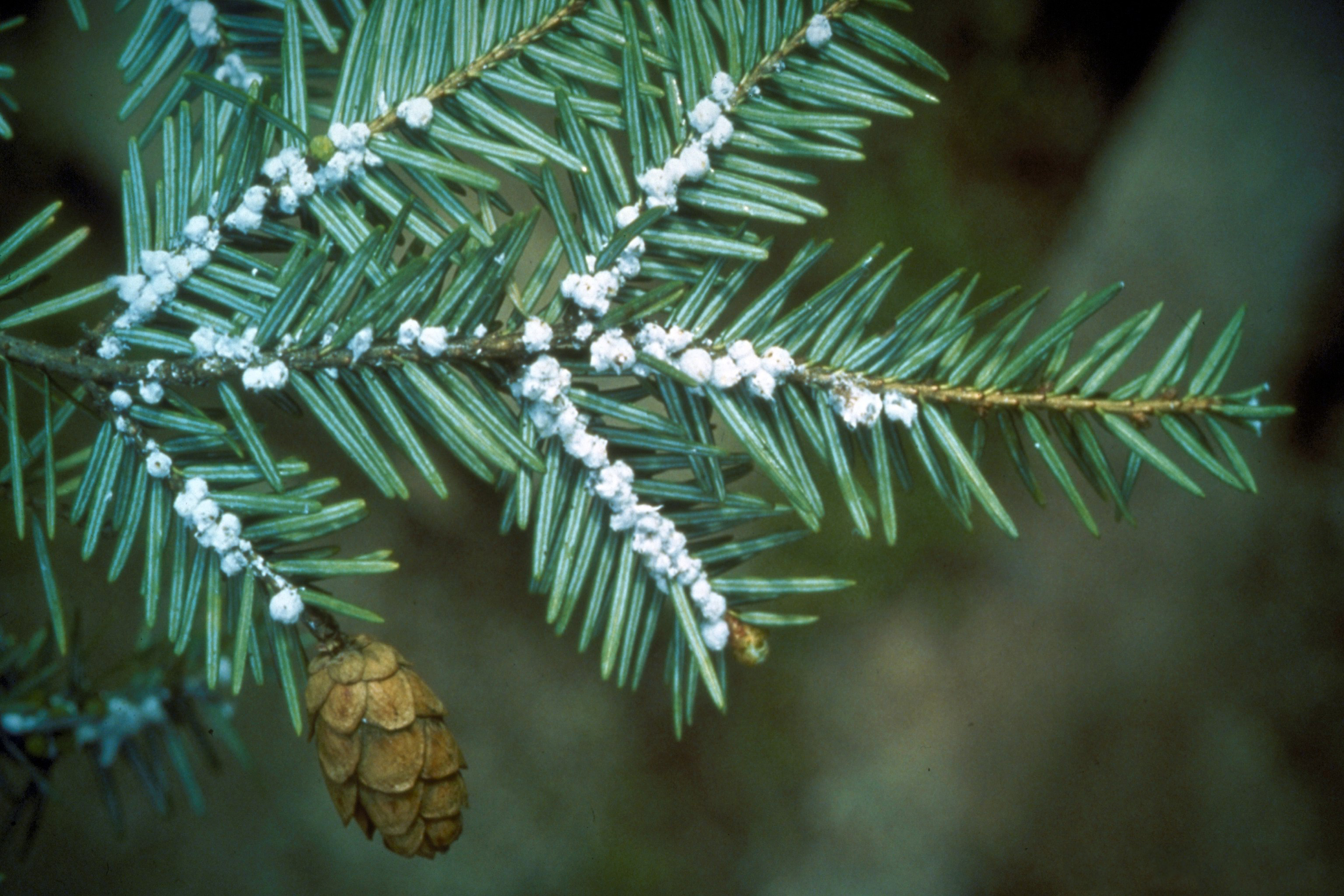
- Hemlock woolly adelgid on western hemlock (Tsuga heterophylla)

Scientific classification
- Kingdom: Animalia
- Phylum: Arthropoda
- Clade: Pancrustacea
- Class: Insecta
- Order: Hemiptera
- Suborder: Sternorrhyncha
- Family: Adelgidae
- Genus: Adelges
- Species: A. tsugae

Binomial name
- Adelges tsugae Annand, 1928

= Hemlock woolly adelgid =

Species of true bug

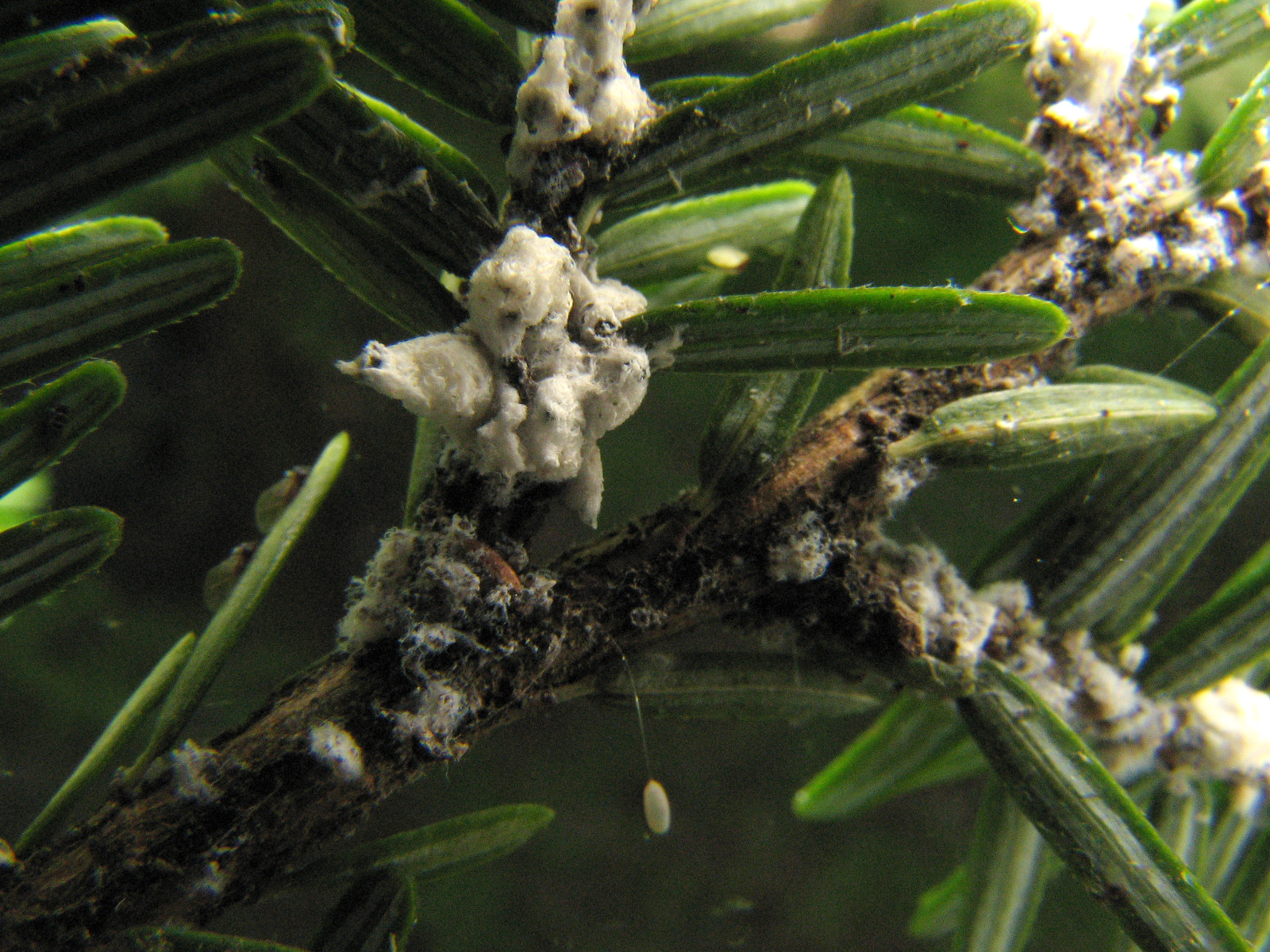
Bays Mountain Park, Sullivan County, Tennessee. With lacewing (Chrysopidae sp. egg)

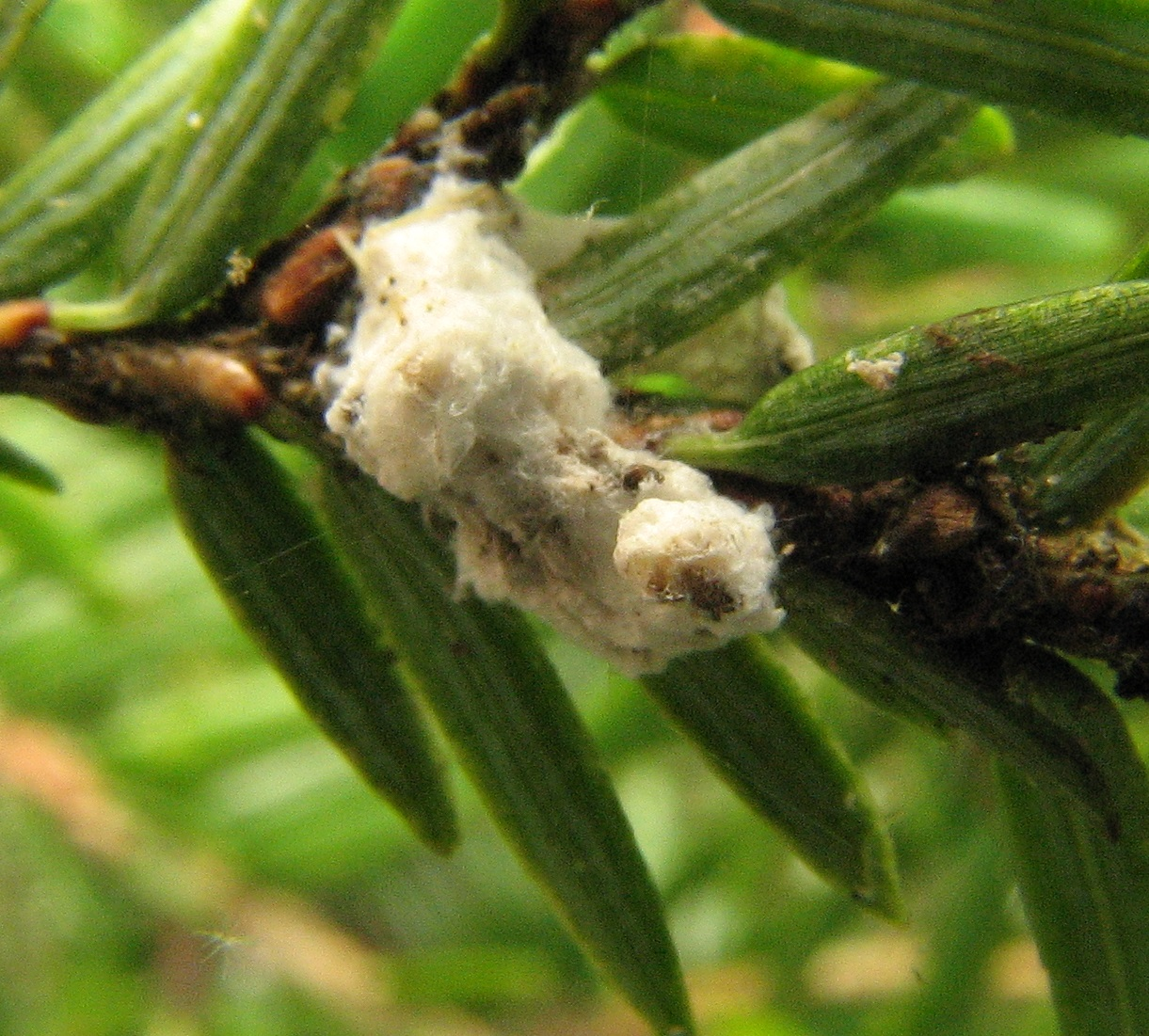
Closeup of a hemlock woolly adelgid

Adelges tsugae, the hemlock woolly adelgid (/əˈdɛl.dʒɪd/) or HWA, is an insect of the order Hemiptera (true bugs) native to East Asia. It feeds by sucking sap from hemlock and spruce trees (Tsuga spp.; Picea spp.). In its native range, HWA is not a serious pest because populations are managed by natural predators and parasitoids and by host resistance. In eastern North America it is a destructive pest that threatens the eastern hemlock (Tsuga canadensis) and the Carolina hemlock (Tsuga caroliniana). HWA is also found in western North America, where it has likely been present for thousands of years. In western North America, it primarily attacks western hemlock (Tsuga heterophylla) and has only caused minor damage due to natural predators and host resistance. Accidentally introduced to North America from Japan, HWA was first found in the eastern United States near Richmond, Virginia, in 1951. The pest is now found from northern Georgia to coastal Maine and southwestern Nova Scotia as well as areas of western Michigan near the eastern Lake Michigan shoreline. As of 2015, HWA has affected 90% of the geographic range of eastern hemlock in North America.

== Characteristics ==
An adult individual body length is typically 0.8 mm, and is oval in shape. The tiny brown-colored insect has four thread-like stylets that are bundled together and function as a mouthpart. Three times the length of its body, the stylet bundle pierces the host plant's parenchymatic ray tissue to derive nutrition from stored reserves. It may also inject a toxin while feeding. The resulting desiccation causes the tree to lose needles and not produce new growth. Hemlocks stricken by HWA frequently become grayish-green rather than a healthy dark green. In the northern portion of the hemlock's range, death typically occurs 4 to 10 years after infestation. Trees that survive the direct effects of the infection are usually weakened and may die from secondary causes.

The presence of HWA can be identified by its egg sacs, which resemble small tufts of cotton clinging to the underside of hemlock branches. In North America, the hemlock woolly adelgid asexually reproduces and can have two generations per year. Both generations are parthenogenetic and exclusively female. In its native Asian habitat, a third winged generation called sexupera occurs. This generation's sexual reproduction requires a species of spruce not found in the Eastern United States. Between 100 and 300 eggs are laid by each individual in the woolly egg sacs beneath the branches. Larvae emerge in spring and can spread on their own or with the assistance of wind, birds, or mammals. In the nymph stage, the adelgid is immobile and settles on a single tree.

== Control methods ==
=== Forest level ===
The current leading biological control method of hemlock woolly adelgid is Sasajiscymnus tsugae, [originally called Pseudoscymnus tsugae]. S. tsugae is a black lady beetle that is relatively host-specific, feeding only on three known adelgid species, including HWA. This beetle was discovered in 1992 while feeding on hemlock woolly adelgid in its natural range of Japan. Since 1995, the Pennsylvania Department of Conservation and Natural Resources's Bureau of Forestry has released hundreds of thousands of adult S. tsugae beetles into affected hemlock forests of the eastern United States to determine its effectiveness at controlling the spread of the adelgid. From 1995 to 1997, experiments in Connecticut and Virginia found that releasing adult Sasajiscymnus tsugae beetles into infested hemlock stands resulted in a 47 to 88% reduction in adelgid densities within 5 months of introduction. The beetle's lifecycle is in parallel to the lifecycle of the hemlock woolly adelgid. Both lay eggs in the spring and hatching occurs nearly simultaneously. When hatched, S. tsugae larvae are highly mobile and feed on hemlock woolly adelgid eggs and larvae. Each S. tsugae larva can effectively consume about 500 adelgid eggs or nearly 100 developing adelgid nymphs.

Laricobius nigrinus is another predatory beetle used as a biological control in response to hemlock woolly adelgid. Native to the western United States and Canada, L. nigrinus is known to prey exclusively on various woolly adelgids. L. nigrinus adults lay their eggs on top of wintering adelgid larvae in early spring, and upon hatching, the larval beetles feed on hemlock woolly adelgid.

Also under study is Laricobius osakensis from Japan, a relative of L. nigrinus. They have shown promise in field trials.

Other natural predators of adelgids include aphid fly larvae (family Chamaemyiidae), certain midge larvae, green lacewings (family Chrysopidae) and brown lacewings (family Hemerobiidae).

=== Individual trees ===
The environmentally safest chemical control methods for treating individual trees are nontoxic insecticidal soap and horticultural oil. These are sprayed on the foliage and smother the insects as they dry. Most trees need to be treated on a yearly basis.

Toxic systemic insecticides may be applied to the foliage and bark of a tree and can persist in killing the adelgid for up to four years after application. Caution must be used, and restraint exercised around bodies of water.

Soil drenches/soil injections/bark sprays are used in larger trees that cannot be completely sprayed with insecticidal soaps or foliage insecticides. The most common insecticide is imidacloprid, which can be effective for several years if absorbed through the soil. Tree roots absorb and transport the product into the foliage and kill hemlock woolly adelgid. Soil drenches must be applied when soil moisture is adequate for the tree roots to absorb the product. These products should not be used in close proximity to bodies of water.

Trunk injections are used for large trees that are near water or where soils are too rocky for soil injections or drenches. The chemical is injected directly into the tree and transported to the twigs and needles where the hemlock woolly adelgids are feeding. Adequate soil moisture is also necessary for the tree to take up these products.

== Significance ==
Hemlock is a vital component of the New England forest system, and is the third-most prevalent tree in Vermont. It provides protection from erosion along stream banks, food for deer and wildlife, and shelter for deer in winter. The tree is also valued both as an ornamental and as an important source of lumber. Unlike the balsam woolly adelgid that attacked only mature balsam fir, HWA infests hemlocks of all ages. Where hemlocks occur in pure stands in that region, the most commonly observed tree species to succeed it is black (sweet) birch. In the southern extreme of its range, hemlock typically occurs not in pure stands, but in linear riparian areas and other moist sites. Succession in these areas is affected by the presence of Rhododendron maximum, which often coexists with hemlock, because a combination of influences restricts regeneration to shade and otherwise understory-tolerant plant species. Major changes in ecosystem structure and function, including hydrologic processes, are expected with the loss of hemlock.

Loss of the eastern and Carolina hemlock from hemlock woolly adelgid infestation will likely result in many ecological shifts in eastern North America. The understory of hemlock forests is characterized as dark, damp, and cool and is an ideal habitat for various other organisms. The moist environment is preferred by many native amphibian species, particularly newts and salamanders. Some species of birds have close association with the hemlock, especially during mating and nesting periods. Aquatic systems adjunct to hemlock stands are also affected by the trees' decline. Brook trout is a native fish species to the eastern United States and is known to prefer the cool, shaded streams of hemlock forests during spawning events. Vulnerable animal populations are expected to diminish as a result of loss of hemlock habitat to the invasive hemlock woolly adelgid.

One factor giving hope is that the adelgid does not seem able to survive prolonged or bitter cold. Following the winter of 1999–2000, a considerable dieback of adelgids and subsequent regrowth of infested trees was observed across Connecticut. The same phenomenon was repeated after the prolonged winter of 2013–2014, in time to save numerous nearly succumbed forests.

A 2009 study conducted by scientists with the U.S. Forest Service Southern Research Station suggests the hemlock woolly adelgid is killing hemlock trees faster than expected in the southern Appalachians, and rapidly altering the carbon cycle of these forests. According to ScienceDaily, the pest could kill most of the region's hemlock trees within the next decade. According to the study, researchers found "hemlock woolly adelgid infestation is rapidly impacting the carbon cycle in [hemlock] tree stands", and "adelgid-infested hemlock trees in the South are declining much faster than the reported 9-year decline of some infested hemlock trees in the Northeast." In fact, as of 2007, the rate of HWA expansion was recorded as 15.6 km/year south of Pennsylvania and 8.13 km/year (or less) in the northern section of the HWA's range.
