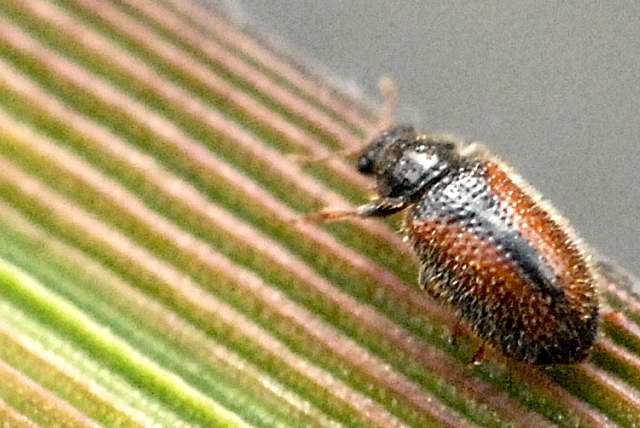
- Laricobius erichsoni from Belgium

Scientific classification
- Kingdom: Animalia
- Phylum: Arthropoda
- Clade: Pancrustacea
- Class: Insecta
- Order: Coleoptera
- Suborder: Polyphaga
- Superfamily: Derodontoidea; LeConte, 1861
- Family: Derodontidae; LeConte, 1861

Genera
- 4, see text

= Derodontidae =

Derodontidae Temporal range: Middle Jurassic–Recent

Family of beetles

Derodontidae is a family of beetles, in its own superfamily, Derodontoidea, sometimes known as the tooth-necked fungus beetles. Beetles of this family are small, between 2 and 6 mm in length, typically with spiny margins on their pronotum (part of the thorax) that give them their name, though the genus Laricobius lacks these spines. Unusual among beetles, they have two ocelli on the top of their heads.

They are related to the Bostrichoidea, which includes the death watch beetles, skin beetles, powder-post beetles and other subgroups.

Some species feed on slime molds, but the larvae and adults of the genus Laricobius are predators of woolly adelgids which attack conifers, and species of this genus are used as biological control agents in the United States for control of balsam woolly adelgid and hemlock woolly adelgid.

There are 42 species in 4 genera and 3 subfamilies. The family includes:

- Subfamily Derodontinae
  - Genus Derodontus (11 species)
- Subfamily Laricobiinae
  - Genus Laricobius (23 species)
  - Genus Nothoderodontus (6 species)
- Subfamily Peltasticinae
  - Genus Peltastica (2 species)

A fossil genus, Juropeltastica, is known from the Middle Jurassic ( ~ 163 million years old) Daohugou Beds of China.
