= South India =

Region in India

South India Peninsular India
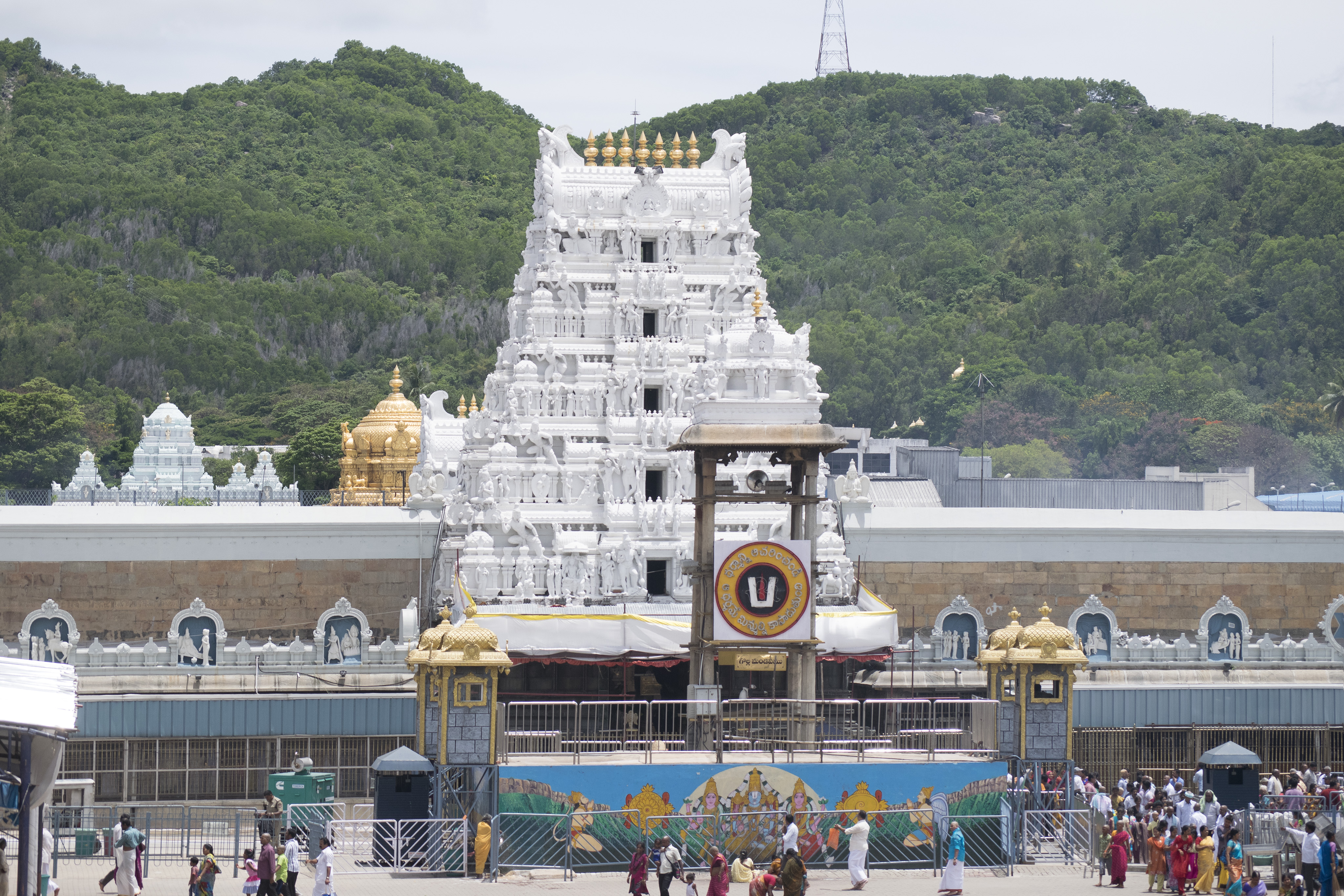
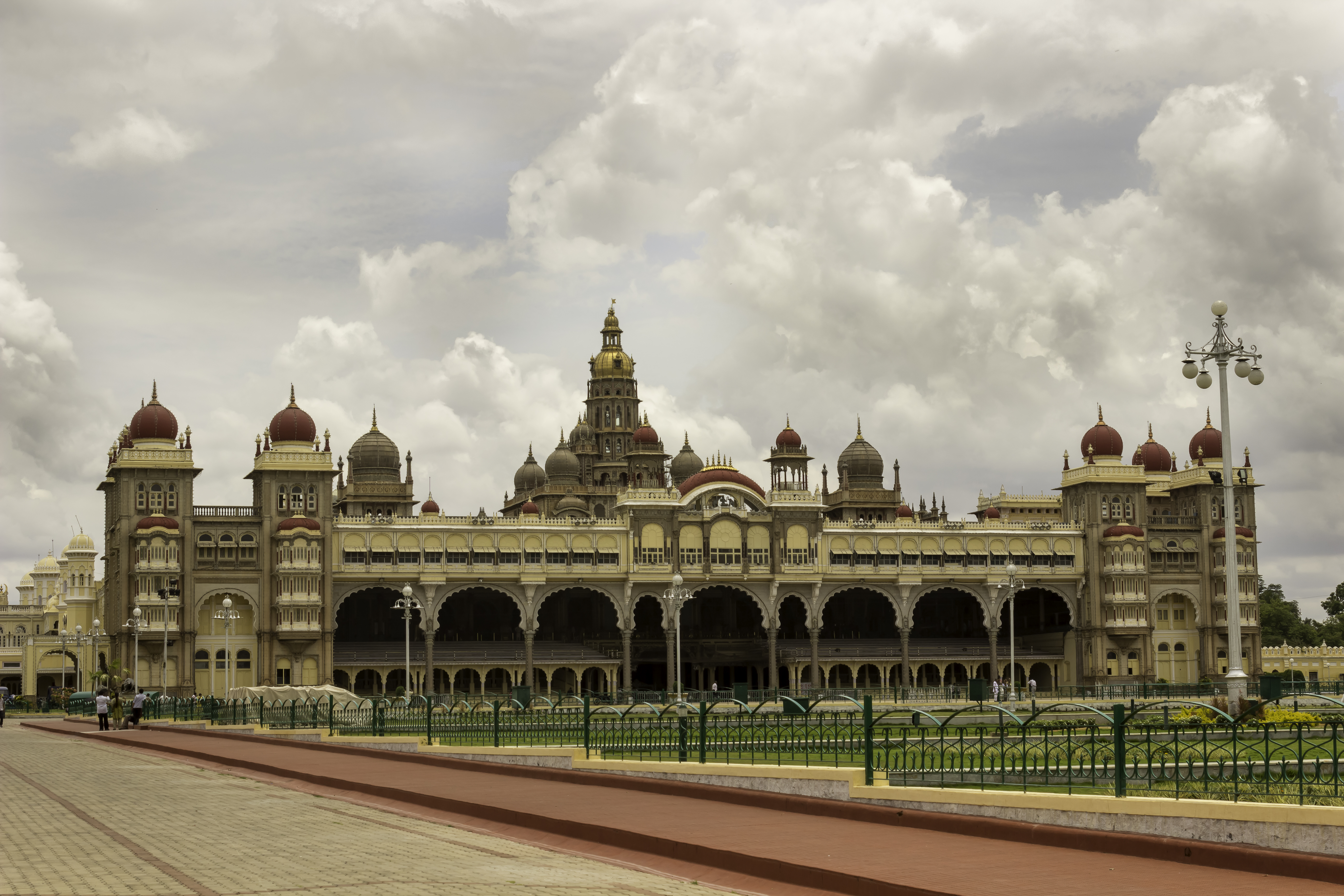
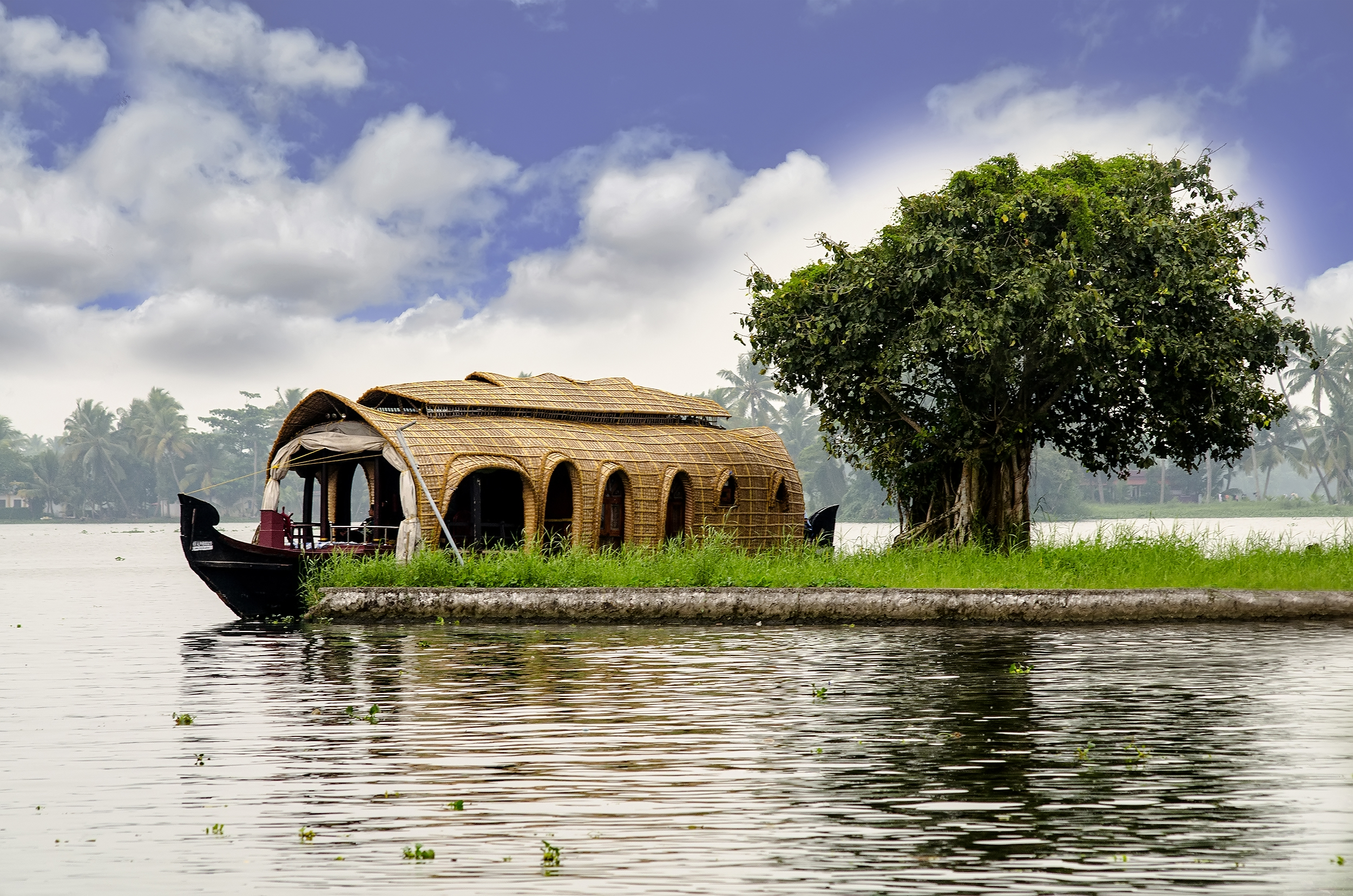
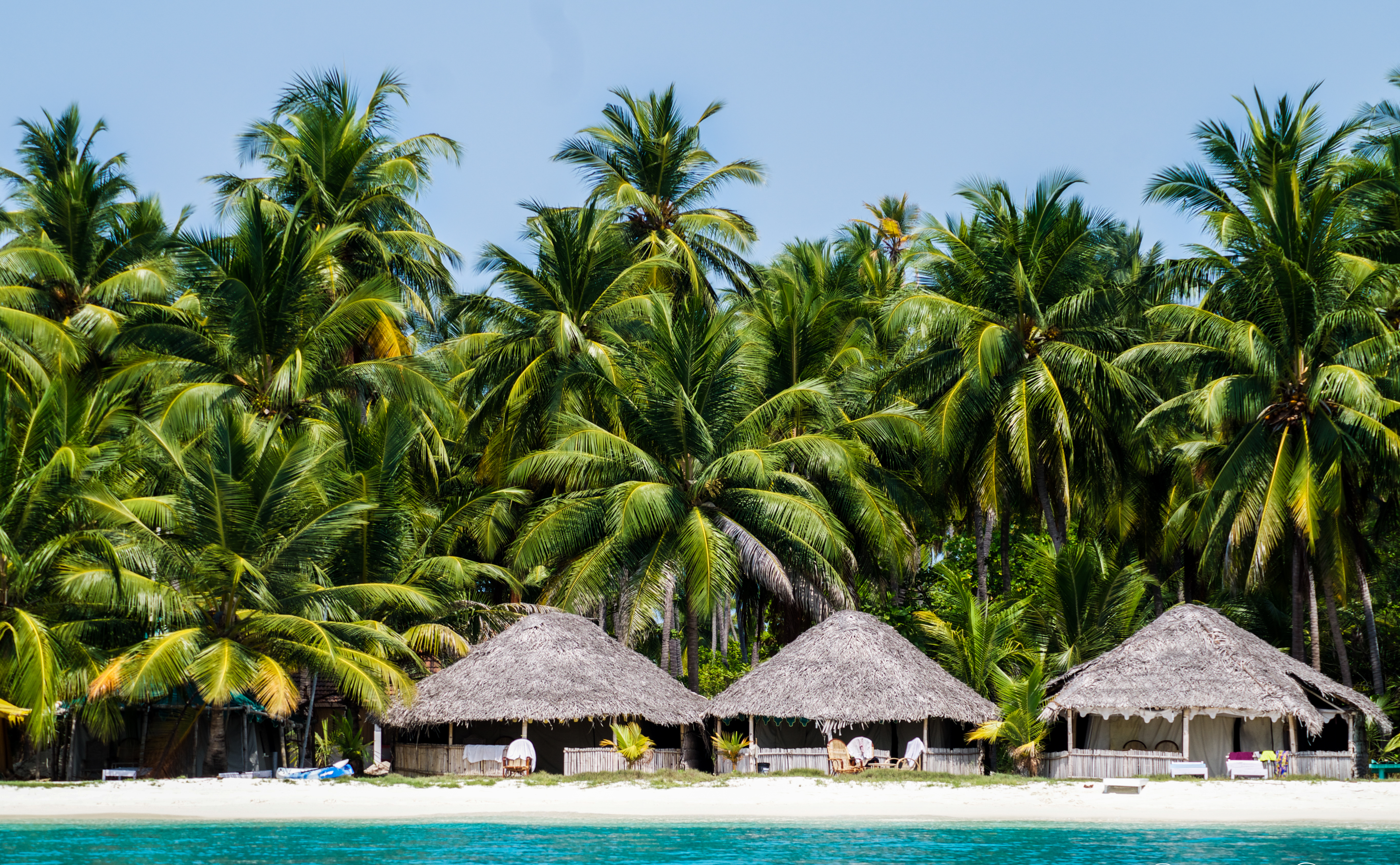
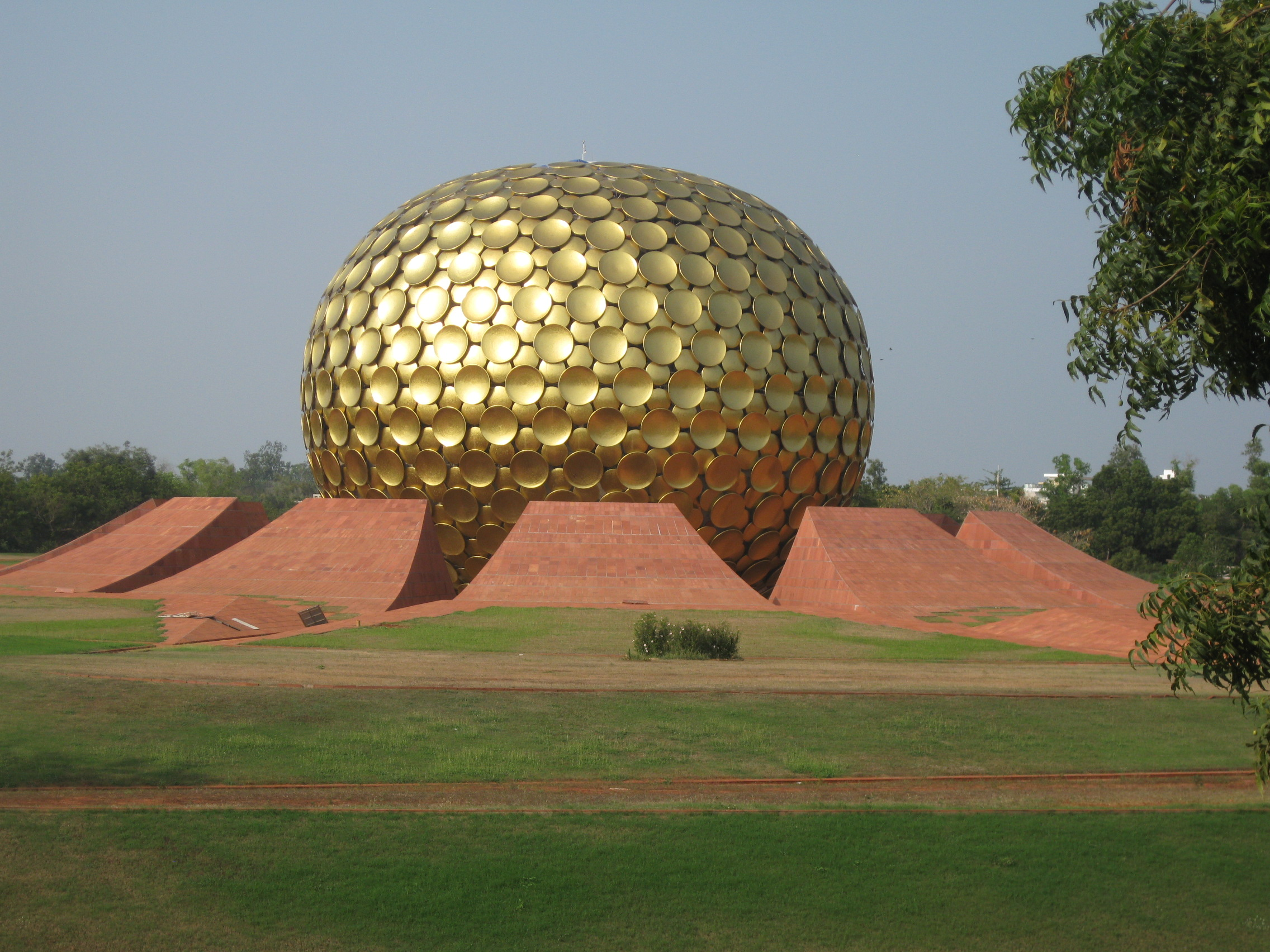
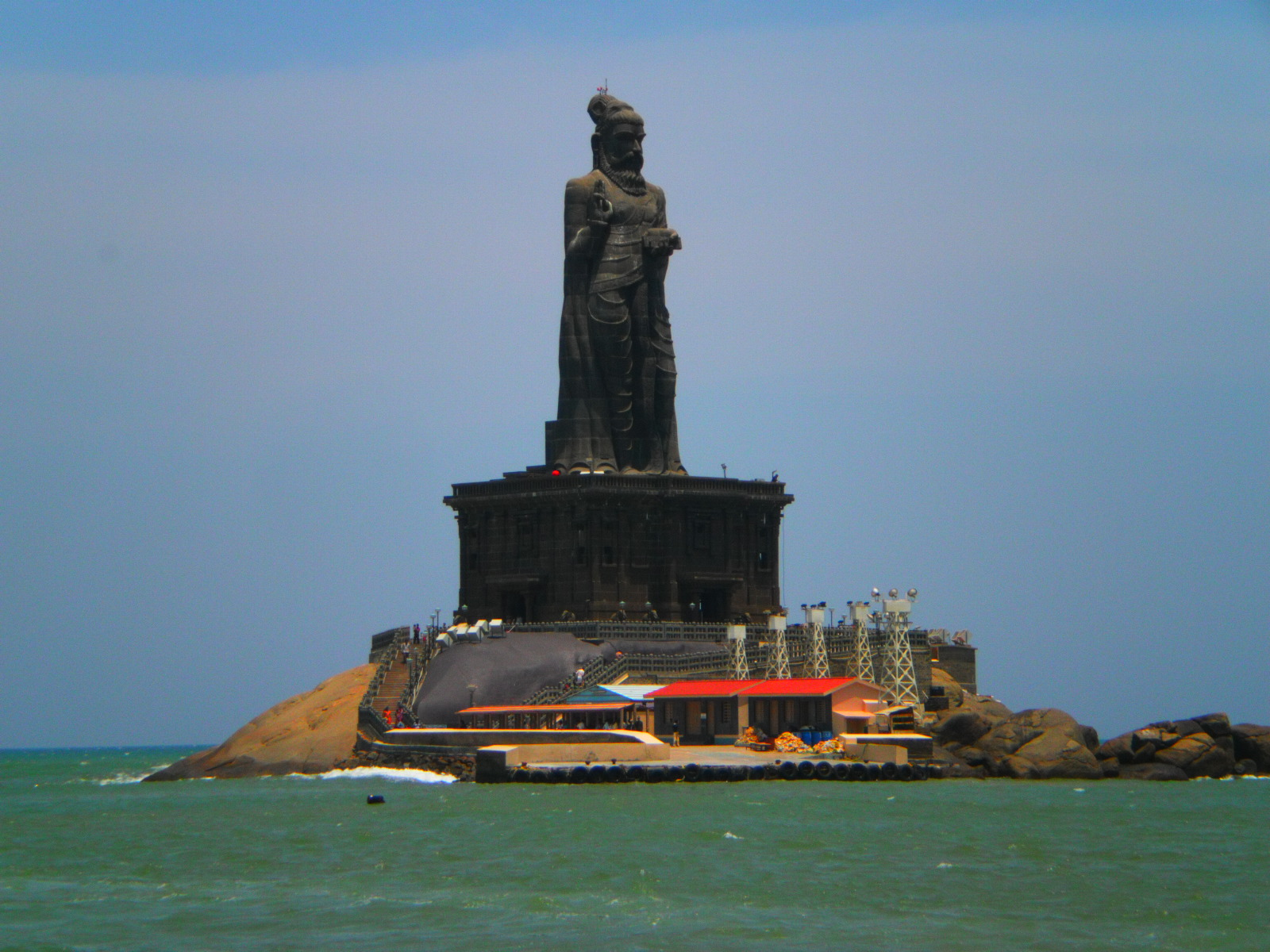
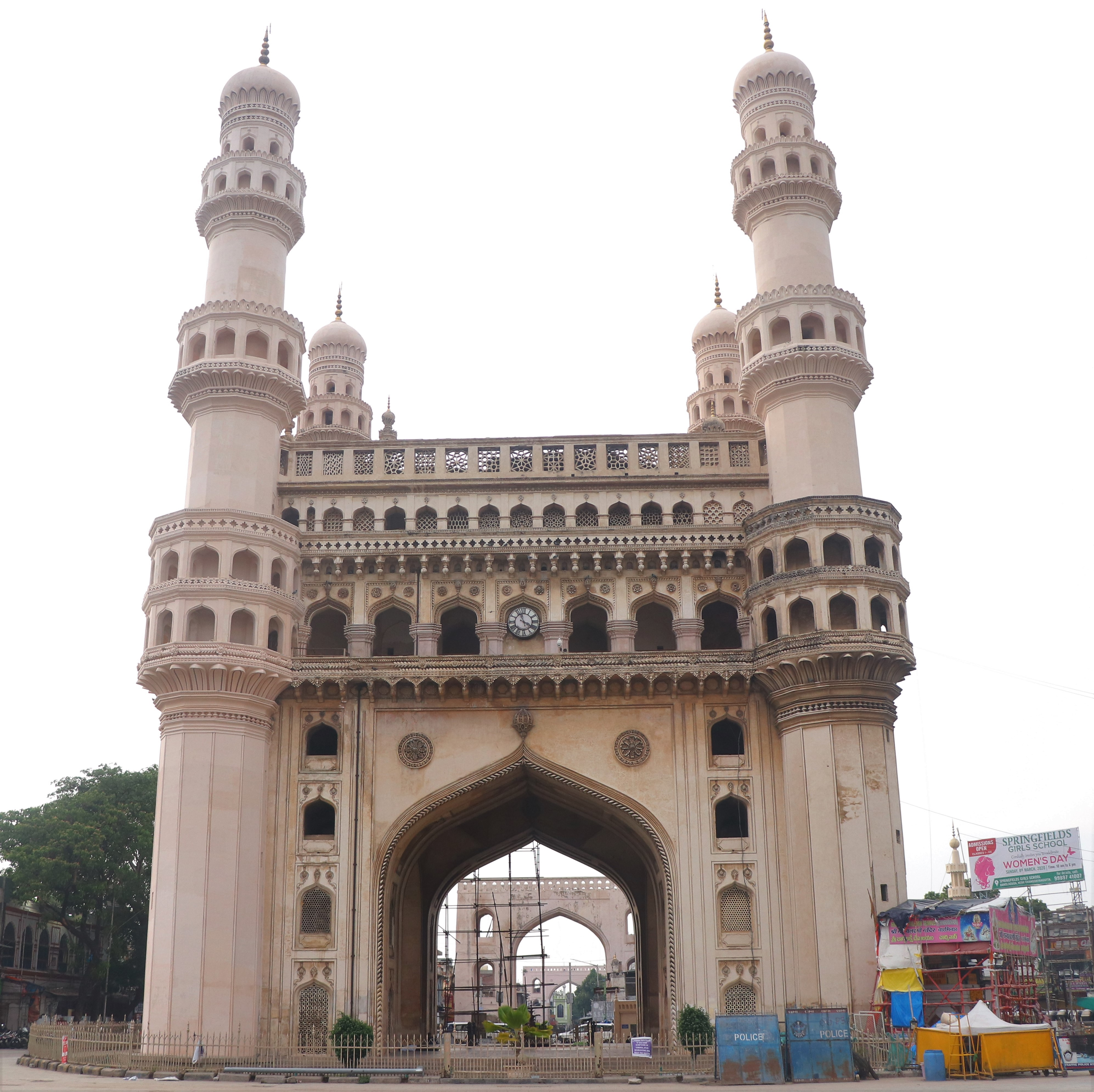
- Tirupati Venkateswara Temple (Andhra Pradesh) Mysore Palace (Karnataka) Backwaters of Alappuzha (Kerala) Bangaram Atoll (Lakshadweep) Matrimandir (Puducherry) Thiruvalluvar Statue (Tamil Nadu) Charminar (Telangana)

- States and union territories in South India
- Country: India
- States and union territories: Andhra Pradesh; Karnataka; Kerala; Lakshadweep; Puducherry; Tamil Nadu; Telangana
- Most populous cities: Chennai; Bengaluru; Hyderabad; Visakhapatnam; Coimbatore

Area
  - Total: 635,780 km^{2} (245,480 sq mi)
- Highest elevation (Anamudi): 2,695 m (8,842 ft)
- Lowest elevation (Kuttanad): −2.2 m (−7.2 ft)

Population (2011)
  - Total: 253,051,953
  - Density: 400/km^{2} (1,000/sq mi)
  - Urban: 111,386,832
- Demonym(s): South Indian; Telugu; Tamilar; Kannadiga; Malayali; Laccadivian; Pondicherrian
- Time zone: IST (UTC+5:30)
- Official languages: Telugu; Tamil; Kannada; Malayalam; English; Urdu
- HDI (2019): ▲0.755 (High)
- Literacy (2011): 76.43%
- Sex ratio (2011): 986 ♀/1000 ♂

South India, also known as Southern India or Peninsular India, is the southern part of the Deccan Peninsula in India encompassing the states of Andhra Pradesh, Karnataka, Kerala, Tamil Nadu and Telangana as well as the union territories of Lakshadweep and Puducherry, occupying 19.31% of India's area (635,780 km^{2} or 245,480 sq mi) and 20% of India's population. It is bound by the Bay of Bengal in the east, the Arabian Sea in the west and the Indian Ocean in the south. The geography of the region is diverse, with two mountain ranges, the Western and Eastern Ghats, bordering the plateau heartland. The Godavari, Krishna, Kaveri, Penna, Tungabhadra and Vaigai rivers are important non-perennial sources of water. Chennai, Bengaluru, Hyderabad, Coimbatore and Kochi are the largest urban areas in the region.

The majority of the people in South India speak at least one of the four major Dravidian languages: Telugu, Tamil, Kannada and Malayalam. During its history, a number of dynastic kingdoms ruled over parts of South India, and shaped the culture in those regions. Major dynasties that were established in South India include the Cheras, Cholas, Pandyas, Pallavas, Satavahanas, Chalukyas, Hoysalas, Rashtrakutas and Vijayanagara. European countries entered India through Kerala and the region was colonized by Britain, Portugal and France.

After experiencing fluctuations in the decades immediately after Indian independence, the economies of South Indian states have registered a sustained higher-than-national-average growth over the past three decades. South India has the largest combined largest gross domestic product compared to other regions in India. The South Indian states lead in some socio-economic metrics of India with a higher HDI as the economy has undergone growth at a faster rate than in most northern states. As of 2011, literacy rates in the southern states are higher than the national average at approximately 76%. The fertility rate in South India is 1.9, the lowest of all regions in India.

== Etymology ==
"South India" is also known as "Peninsular India" indicating its location in a peninsula surrounded by water on three sides. The term "Deccan", referring to the area covered by the Deccan Plateau that covers most of peninsular India excluding the coastal areas, is an anglicised form of the Prakrit word dakkhiṇa derived from the Sanskrit word dakshiṇa meaning south. Carnatic, derived from "Karnāḍ" or "Karunāḍ" meaning black country, has also been associated with South India.

== History ==
=== Ancient and medieval era ===
Extent of the Chola Empire during the reign of Rajendra Chola I, circa. 1030 CE

Carbon dating shows that ash mounds associated with Neolithic cultures in South India date back to 8000 BCE. Towards the beginning of 1000 BCE, iron technology spread through the region; however, there does not appear to be a fully developed Bronze Age preceding the Iron Age in South India. The region was in the middle of a trade route that extended from Muziris to Arikamedu linking the Mediterranean to East Asia. Trade with Phoenicians, Romans, Greeks, Arabs, Syrians, Jews, and Chinese began during the Sangam period (c. 3rd century BCE to c. 4th century CE). The region was part of the ancient Silk Road connecting the East with the West.

Several dynasties such as the Cheras of Karuvur, the Pandyas of Madurai, the Cholas of Thanjavur, the Zamorins of Kozhikode, the Satavahanas of Amaravati, the Pallavas of Kanchi, the Kadambas of Banavasi, the Western Gangas of Kolar, the Rashtrakutas of Manyakheta, the Chalukyas of Badami, the Hoysalas of Belur, and the Kakatiyas of Orugallu ruled over the region from the 6th century BCE to the 14th century CE. In the 15th century, Vijayanagara Empire was the last kingdom to conquer all of Southern India. After repeated invasions from the Sultanate of Delhi, the Vijayanagara Empire fell in 1646 and the region was ruled by various Deccan Sultanates, polygars and Nayak governors of the erstwhile Vijayanagara Empire who declared independence.

=== Colonial era ===
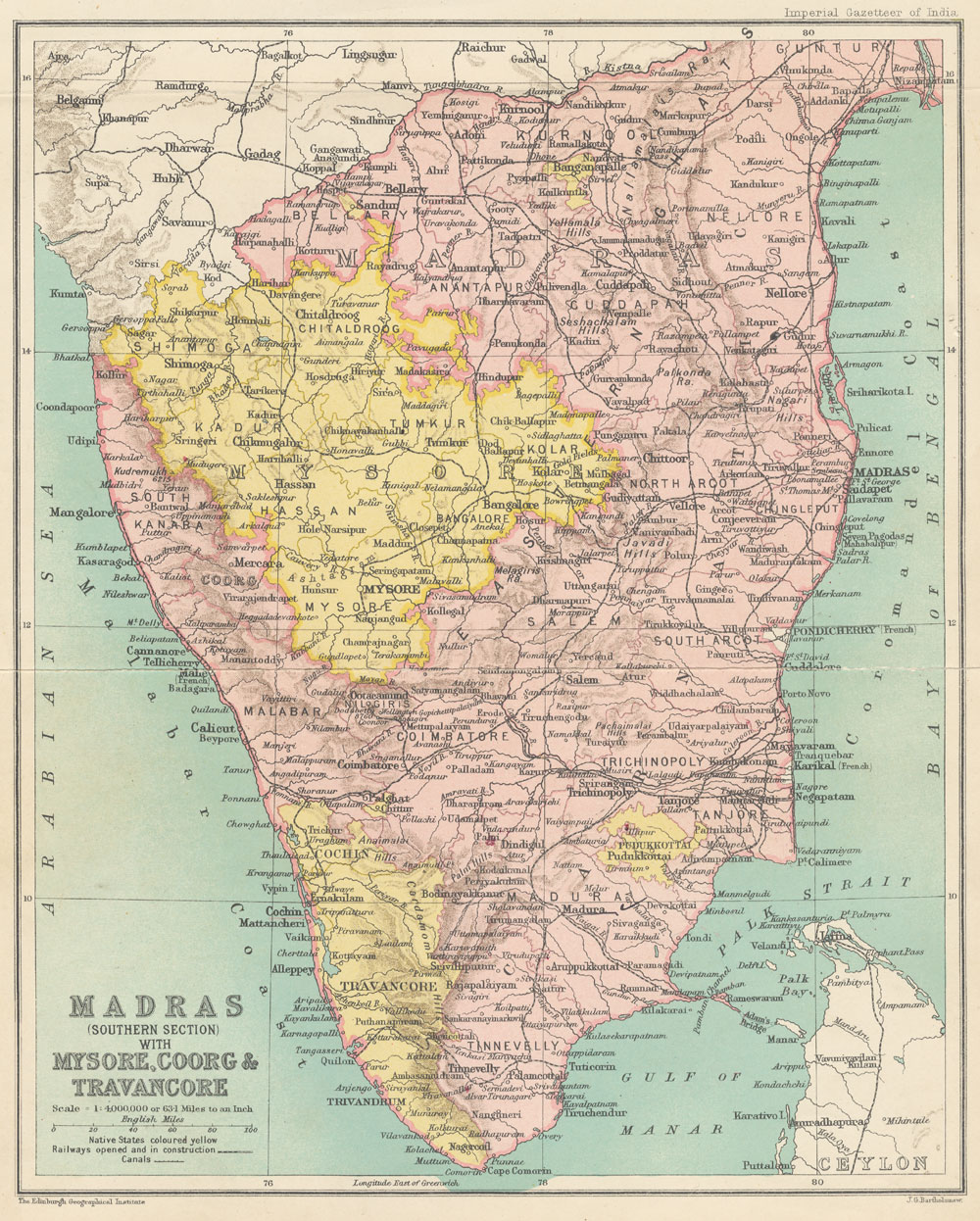
Map of South India during the British Raj (1909)

The Europeans arrived in the 15th century; and by the middle of the 18th century, the French and the British were involved in a protracted struggle for military control over South India. After the defeat of Tipu Sultan in the Fourth Anglo-Mysore War in 1799 and the end of the Vellore Mutiny in 1806, the British consolidated their power over much of present-day South India, with the exception of French Pondichéry. The British Empire took control of the region from the British East India Company in 1857. During the British colonial rule, the region was divided into the Madras Presidency (later, the Madras Province), Hyderabad State, Mysore, and the Madras States Agency (composed of Travancore, Cochin, Jeypore, and a number of other minor princely states). The region played a major role in the Indian independence movement. Of the 72 delegates who participated in the first session of the Indian National Congress at Bombay in December 1885, 22 hailed from South India.

=== Post-independence ===
After Indian Independence in 1947, the region was organized into the states of Madras State, Mysore State, Hyderabad State, and Travancore-Cochin. Dravida Nadu was a proposal for a separate sovereign state for the speakers of the Dravidian languages in South India. Initially, the demand of Dravida Nadu proponents was limited to Tamil-speaking regions, but it was later expanded to include other Indian states with a majority of Dravidian-speakers in the region. The States Reorganisation Act 1956, which reorganized the states based on linguistic lines, weakened the demand for a separate sovereign state.

The reorganisation resulted in the region being organised into the states of Andhra Pradesh, Kerala, Madras, and Mysore. The Madras State retained its name with Kanyakumari district added to it from Travancore-Cochin, and the state was subsequently renamed as Tamil Nadu in 1968. Andhra Pradesh was created from the merger of Andhra State with the Telugu-speaking districts of Hyderabad State. Kerala was formed by the merger of Malabar district and Kasaragod taluk of South Canara district of Madras State with Travancore-Cochin. Mysore State was reorganised with the addition of the districts of Bellary and South Canara (excluding Kasaragod taluk) and the Kollegal taluk of Coimbatore district from the Madras State, the districts of Belgaum, Bijapur, North Canara, and Dharwad from Bombay State, the Kannada-majority districts of Bidar, Raichur and Gulbarga from Hyderabad State and the province of Coorg. Mysore State was renamed as Karnataka in 1973. The union territory of Puducherry was created in 1954 comprising the previous French enclaves of Pondichéry, Karaikal, Yanam and Mahé. The Laccadive Islands which were divided between South Canara and Malabar districts of Madras State were united and organized into the union territory of Lakshadweep. Telangana was created on June 2, 2014, by bifurcating Andhra Pradesh and comprises ten districts in northwestern Andhra Pradesh.

== Geography ==
=== Topography ===
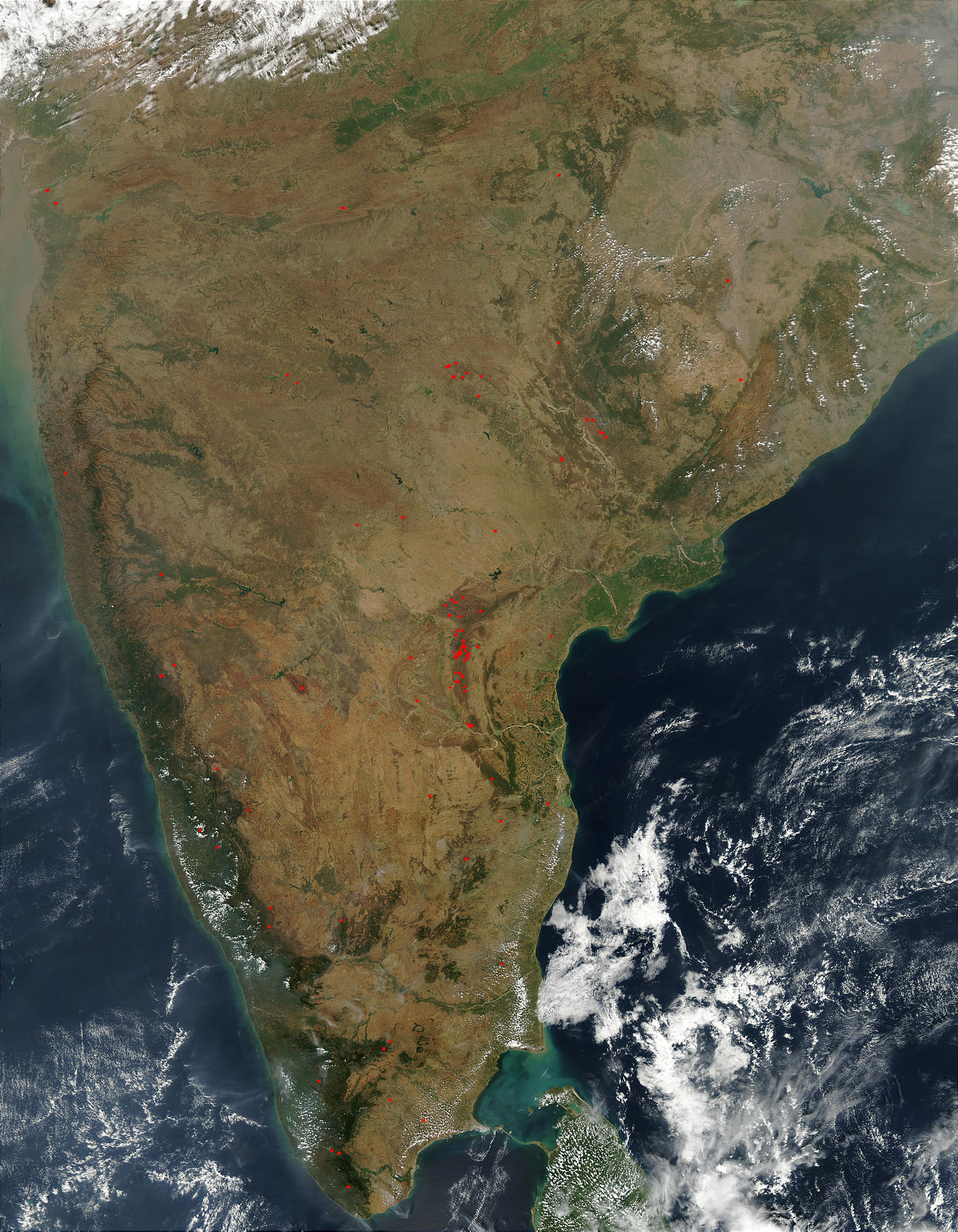
Satellite image of South India

South India is a peninsula in the shape of an inverted triangle bound by the Indian Ocean in the South, the Arabian Sea in the west, the Bay of Bengal in the east and the Vindhya and Satpura ranges in the north. The Narmada River flows westwards in the depression between the Vindhya and Satpura ranges, which define the northern spur of the region. The southernmost tip of mainland India is at Kanyakumari where the Indian Ocean meets the Bay of Bengal and the Arabian Sea. The Palk Strait, the Gulf of Mannar, and the chain of low sandbars and islands known as Rama's Bridge separate the region from Sri Lanka, which lies off the southeastern coast of the Indian mainland.

The low-lying islands of Lakshadweep are situated off the southwestern coast of India. In the Lakshadweep, the Eight Degree Channel separates the Laccadive and Amindivi Islands from the Minicoy Island to the south. Laccadive Sea is a smaller sea. There are coral reefs located in the Gulf of Mannar and the Lakshadweep islands.

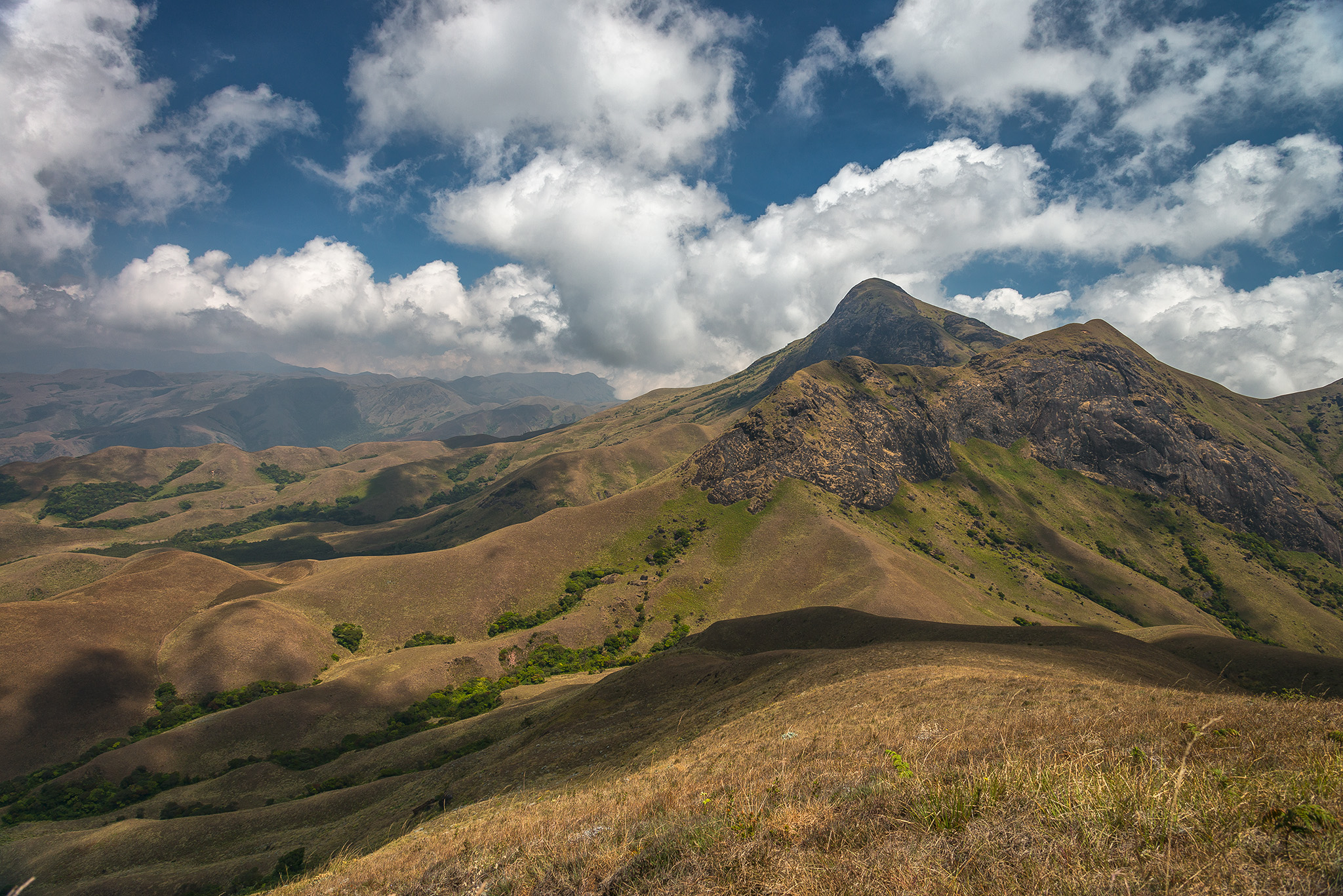
The peak of Anamudi is the highest point of elevation in South India

The Western Ghats runs south along the western coast from south of the Tapti river to Kanyakumari and forms a narrow strip of land with the Arabian Sea, divided into Konkan and Malabar regions. Anaimudi in the Anaimalai Hills in the Western Ghats is the highest peak in South India at 2,695 m (8,842 ft). The Eastern Ghats run parallel to the eastern coast along the Bay of Bengal and the strip of land between them forms the Coromandel region. They are a discontinuous range of mountains, which have been eroded and quadrisected by the four major rivers of South India–Godavari, Mahanadi, Krishna, and Kaveri. Both the mountain ranges meet at Nilgiris, which run in a crescent approximately along the borders of Tamil Nadu with northern Kerala and Karnataka, encompassing the Palakkad and Wayanad hills and the Sathyamangalam ranges, and extending to the relatively low-lying hills of the Eastern Ghats on the western portion of the Tamil Nadu–Andhra Pradesh border, forming the Tirupati and Annamalai hills.

The Deccan Plateau is the elevated region bound by the mountain ranges. The plateau rises to 100 m (330 ft) in the north and to more than 1 km (0.62 mi) in the south, forming a raised triangle within the downward-pointing triangle of the Indian subcontinent's coastline. It also slopes gently from West to East resulting in major rivers arising in the Western Ghats and flowing east into the Bay of Bengal. The volcanic basalt beds of the Deccan were laid down in the massive Deccan Traps eruption, which occurred towards the end of the Cretaceous period, between 67 and 66 million years ago. Multiple layers were formed by repeated volcanic activity that lasted many years and when the volcanoes became extinct, they left a region of highlands with typically vast stretches of flat areas on the top. Large lakes in the region include Vembanad, and Pulicat Lakes.

=== Climate ===
Climatic zones

Monsoon onset

The region has a tropical climate and depends on monsoons for rainfall. According to the Köppen climate classification, it has a non-arid climate with minimum mean temperatures of 18 °C (64 °F). The humid tropical monsoon climate characterised by moderate to high year-round temperatures and seasonally heavy rainfall above 2,000 mm (79 in) per year, is experienced in a strip of south-western lowlands abutting the Malabar Coast, the Western Ghats, and the Lakshadweep islands.

A tropical wet and dry climate, drier than areas with a tropical monsoon climate, prevails over most of the inland peninsular region except for a semi-arid rain shadow east of the Western Ghats. Winter and early summer are long dry periods with temperatures averaging above 18 °C (64 °F); summer is exceedingly hot with temperatures in low-lying areas exceeding 50 °C (122 °F); and the rainy season lasts from June to September, with annual rainfall averaging between 750 and 1,500 mm (30 and 59 in) across the region. Post September, only parts of Tamil Nadu receives precipitation, leaving other states comparatively dry. A hot semi-arid climate predominates in the land east of the Western Ghats and the Cardamom Hills. The region – which includes Karnataka, inland Tamil Nadu and western Andhra Pradesh – gets between 400 and 750 mm (16 and 30 in) of rainfall annually, with hot summers and dry winters with average temperatures of 20–24 °C (68–75 °F). The months between March and May are hot and dry, with mean monthly temperatures hovering around 32 °C (90 °F), with an average of 320 mm (13 in) precipitation. Without artificial irrigation, this region is not suitable for agriculture.

The southwest monsoon from June to September accounts for most of the rainfall in the region. The Arabian Sea branch of the southwest monsoon hits the Western Ghats along the coastal state of Kerala and moves northward along the Konkan coast, bringing rainfall to the coastal areas west of the Western Ghats. The lofty Western Ghats prevent the winds from reaching the interior of the Deccan Plateau, resulting in the leeward region (the region deprived of winds) receiving very little rainfall. The Bay of Bengal branch of the southwest monsoon heads toward northeast India, picking up moisture from the Bay of Bengal. The Coramandel coast does not receive much rainfall from the southwest monsoon, due to the shape of the land. Tamil Nadu and southeastern Andhra Pradesh receive rains from the northeast monsoon. The northeast monsoon takes place from November to early March, when the surface high-pressure system is strongest. The North Indian Ocean tropical cyclones occur throughout the year in the Bay of Bengal and the Arabian Sea, bringing devastating winds and heavy rainfall.

=== Flora and fauna ===
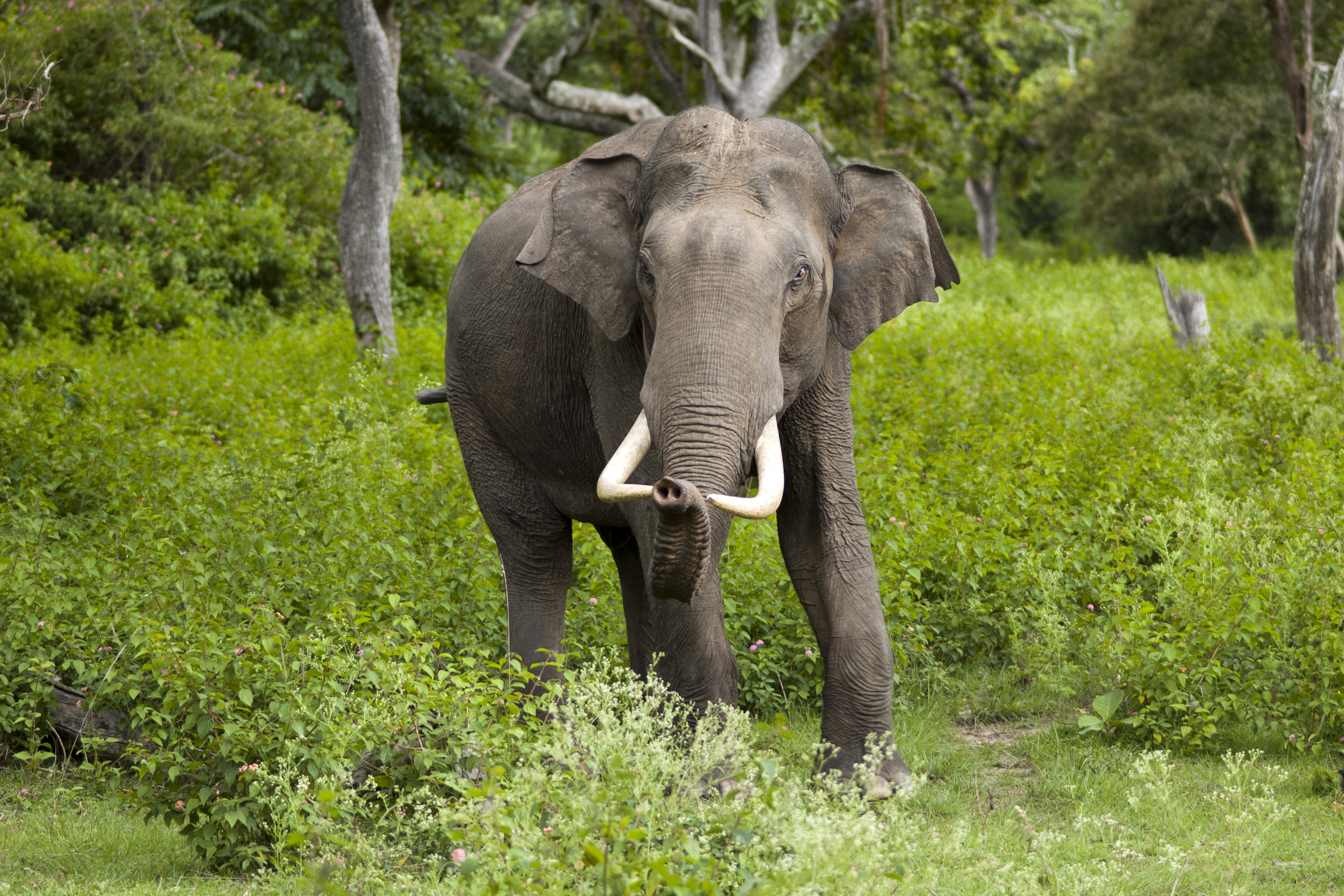
South India has a significant Asian elephant population

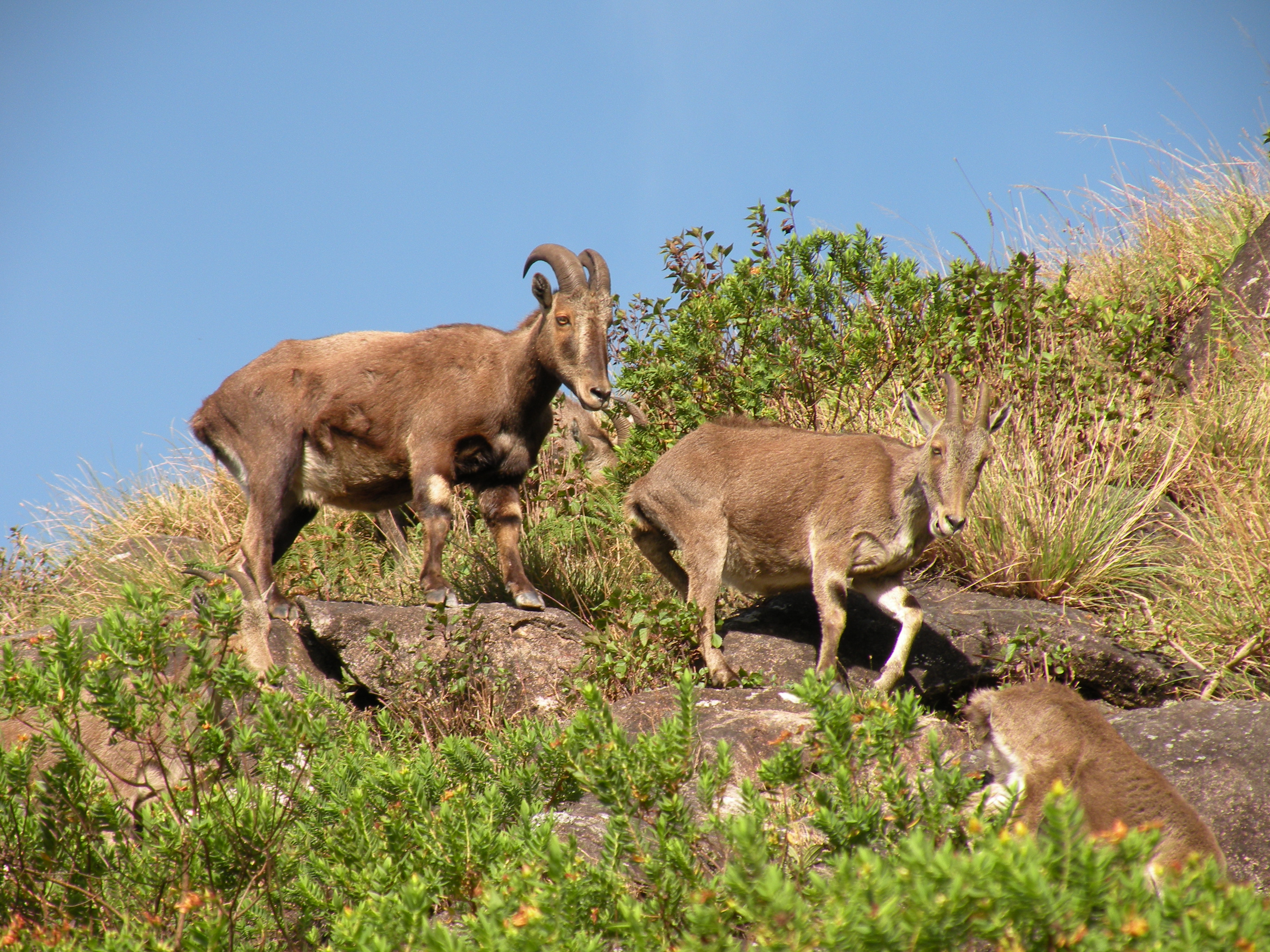
Nilgiri tahr found only in the region

There is a wide diversity of plants and animals in South India, resulting from its varied climates and geography. Deciduous forests are found along the Western Ghats while tropical dry forests and scrub lands are common in the interior Deccan Plateau. The southern Western Ghats have rain forests located at high altitudes called the South Western Ghats montane rain forests, and the Malabar Coast moist forests are found on the coastal plains. The Western Ghats is one of the eight hottest biodiversity hotspots in the world and a UNESCO World Heritage Site.

Important ecological regions of South India include the Nilgiri Biosphere Reserve in the Nilgiri Hills, and the Agasthyamala Biosphere Reserve in the Agastya Mala-Cardamom Hills. The Gulf of Mannar Biosphere Reserve covers an area of 10,500 km^{2} (4,100 sq mi) of ocean, islands and the adjoining coastline including coral reefs, salt marshes, and mangroves. It is home to several endangered aquatic species, including dolphins, dugongs, whales and sea cucumbers. There are 28 bird sanctuaries including Kadalundi, Kallaperambur, Kazhuveli, Kumarakom, Neelapattu, Point Calimere, Pulicat, Ranganathittu, Thattekad, and Vedanthangal, which are home to numerous migratory and local birds.

South India is home to significant population of endangered Bengal tigers and Indian elephants, and is home to one-third of the tiger population and more than half of the elephant population in India. There are 14 Tiger reserves designated under Project Tiger and 11 Project Elephant reserves. Elephant populations are found in eight fragmented sites in the region: in northern Karnataka, along the Western Ghats, in Bhadra–Malnad, in Brahmagiri–Nilgiris–Eastern Ghats, in Nilambur–Silent Valley–Coimbatore, in Anamalai–Parambikulam, in Periyar–Srivilliputhur, and in Agasthyamalai Other threatened and endangered species found in the region include the grizzled giant squirrel, grey slender loris, Indian leopard. lion-tailed macaque, Nilgiri langur, Nilgiri tahr, and sloth bear.

Symbols of states of South India
Name	Animal	Bird	Tree	Fruit	Flower
Andhra Pradesh	Blackbuck (Antilope cervicapra)	Rose-ringed parakeet (Psittacula krameri)	Neem (Azadirachta indica)	Mango (Mangifera indica)	Common jasmine (Jasminum officinale)
Karnataka	Indian elephant (Elephas maximus)	Indian roller (Coracias indica)	Sandalwood (Santalum album)	Mango (Mangifera indica)	Lotus (Nelumbo nucifera)
Kerala	Indian elephant (Elephas maximus)	Great hornbill (Buceros bicornis)	Coconut (Cocos nucifera)	Jackfruit (Artocarpus heterophyllus)	Cana fistula (Cassia fistula)
Lakshadweep	Butterfly fish (Chaetodon falcula)	Noddy tern (Anous stolidus)	Bread fruit (Artocarpus incisa)		
Puducherry	Indian palm squirrel (Funambulus palmarum)	Koel (Eudynamys scolopaceus)	Bael fruit (Aegle marmelos)		Cannonball (Couroupita guianensis)
Tamil Nadu	Nilgiri tahr (Nilgiritragus hylocrius)	Emerald dove (Chalcophaps indica)	Palmyra palm (Borassus flabellifer)	Jackfruit (Artocarpus heterophyllus)	Glory lily (Gloriosa superba)
Telangana	Chital deer (Axis axis)	Indian roller (Coracias indica)	Khejri (Prosopis cineraria)	Mango (Mangifera indica)	Tanner's cassia (Senna auriculata)

== Politics ==
Politics in South India is characterized by a mix of regional and national political parties. The Justice Party and Swaraj Party were the two major parties in the erstwhile Madras Presidency. The Justice Party eventually lost the 1937 elections to the Indian National Congress, and Chakravarti Rajagopalachari became the Chief Minister of the Madras Presidency. During the 1920s and 1930s, the Self-Respect Movement, spearheaded by Theagaroya Chetty and E. V. Ramaswamy (Periyar), emerged in the Madras Presidency. In 1944, Periyar transformed the party into a social organisation, renaming the party Dravidar Kazhagam, and withdrew from electoral politics, with the initial aim of secession from the rest of India upon Indian independence.

After independence, C. N. Annadurai, a follower of Periyar, formed the Dravida Munnetra Kazhagam (DMK) in 1948. The Indian National Congress dominated the political scene in Madras in the 1950s and 1960s under the leadership of K. Kamaraj, who led the party after the death of Jawaharlal Nehru and ensured the selection of Prime Ministers Lal Bahadur Shastri and Indira Gandhi. The anti-Hindi agitations led to the rise of the DMK, which came to power in 1967. In 1972, a split in the DMK resulted in the formation of the All India Anna Dravida Munnetra Kazhagam (AIADMK) led by M. G. Ramachandran. Dravidian parties continue to dominate Tamil Nadu electoral politics, the national parties usually aligning as junior partners to the major Dravidian parties, AIADMK and DMK.

The Congress continues to be a major party in Karnataka, Kerala, Puducherry, and Telangana. The party ruled with minimal opposition for 30 years in Andhra Pradesh, before the formation of the Telugu Desam Party by Nandamuri Taraka Rama Rao in 1982. In Karnataka, the Bharatiya Janata Party and Janata Dal (Secular) emerged as significant parties in the late 20th century. Two prominent coalitions in Kerala are the United Democratic Front, led by the Congress, and the Left Democratic Front, led by the Communist Party of India (Marxist). For the past fifty years, these two coalitions have been alternately in power; and E. M. S. Namboodiripad, the first elected chief minister of Kerala in 1957, is credited as the leader of the first democratically elected communist government in the world. Parties which split from the Congress such as YSR Congress in Andhra Pradesh, and All India N.R. Congress in Puducherry, have emerged as significant regional parties in their respective regions. The Telangana Rashtra Samithi emerged as a prominent party in Telangana, after its campaign for statehood for Telangana and the state's formation in 2014.

Rajagopalachari was the first and only Indian to hold the post Governor General of India, before the position was abolished in January 1950. The region has produced six Indian presidents, namely, Sarvepalli Radhakrishnan, V. V. Giri, Neelam Sanjiva Reddy, R. Venkataraman, K. R. Narayanan, and APJ Abdul Kalam. Indian prime ministers from South India include P. V. Narasimha Rao, and H. D. Deve Gowda.

=== Administration ===

South India consists of the five southern Indian states of Andhra Pradesh, Telangana, Karnataka, Kerala, and Tamil Nadu, and the union territories of Puducherry, and Lakshadweep. Puducherry and the five states each have an elected legislature, while Lakshadweep is administered by the union government.

A governor, who is appointed by the president of India, is the de jure head of the government in the states. The governor appoints the leader of the state legislature's ruling party or coalition as the chief minister, who is the de facto head of the government.

Each state or territory is further divided into districts, each of which is administered by a district collector. For land revenue administration, the districts are further subdivided into revenue divisions administered by revenue divisional officers which are further subdivided into revenue divisions and taluks or tehsils administered by tehsildars. The taluks are divided into revenue blocks called firkas which consist of revenue villages. The local administration consists of municipal corporations, municipalities, and town panchayats in the urban areas, and panchayat unions and village panchayats, in rural areas.

==== States ====
Name	ISO	Established	Area (km^{2})	Capital
Andhra Pradesh	AP	1 October 1953	162,968	Amaravati (Note: Telangana was subdivided from Andhra Pradesh on 2 June 2014. Hyderabad, located entirely within the borders of Telangana, served as the joint capital for both the states initially.)
Karnataka	KA	1 November 1956	191,791	Bengaluru
Kerala	KL	1 November 1956	38,863	Thiruvananthapuram
Tamil Nadu	TN	26 January 1950	130,058	Chennai
Telangana	TG	2 June 2014	112,077	Hyderabad

==== Union territories ====
Name	ISO	Established	Area (km^{2})	Capital
Lakshadweep	LD	1 November 1956	30	Kavaratti
Puducherry	PY	1 July 1963	490	Puducherry

=== Legislative representation ===
Legislative assemblies of states

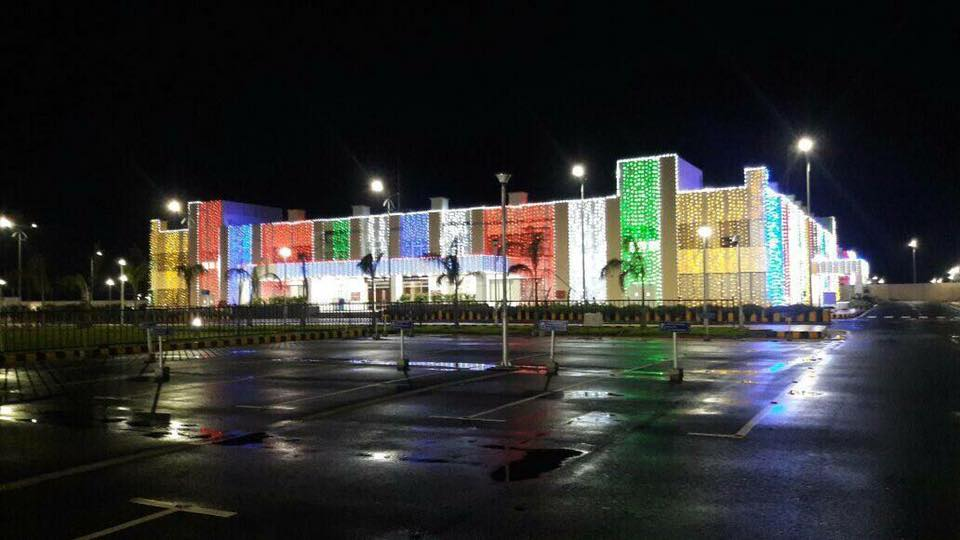
Shasana Sabha (Andhra Pradesh)

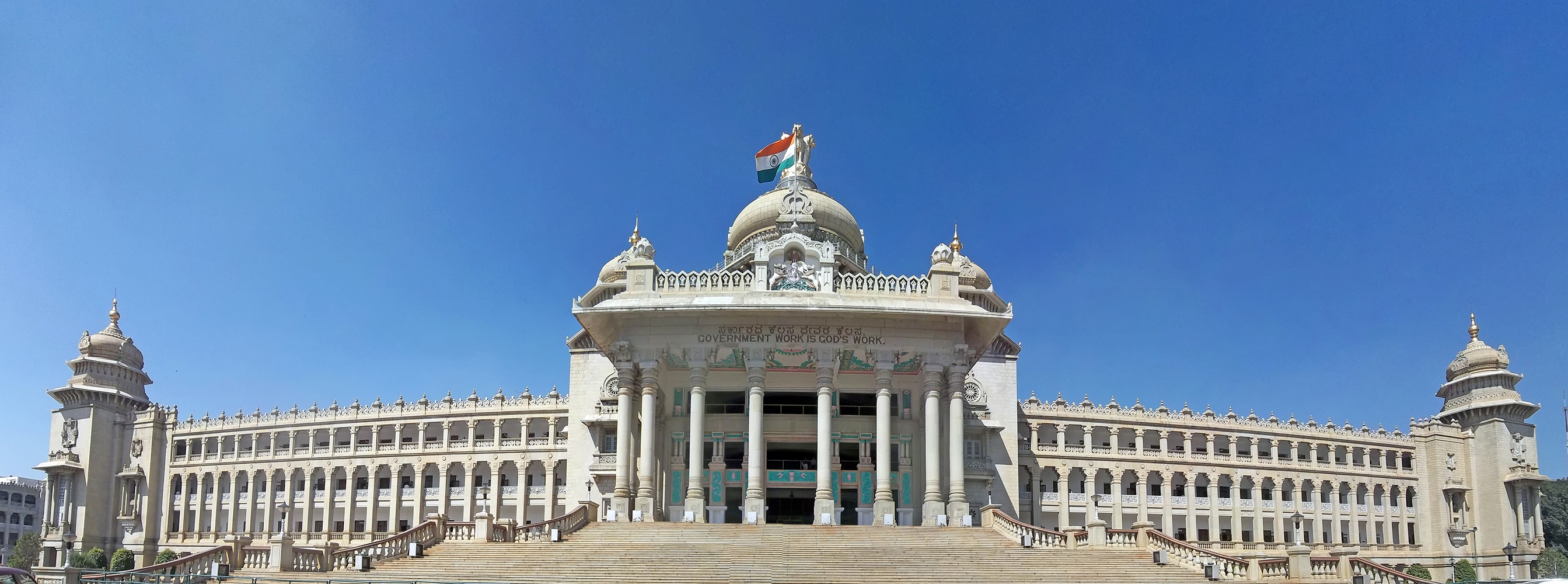
Vidhan Soudha (Karnataka)

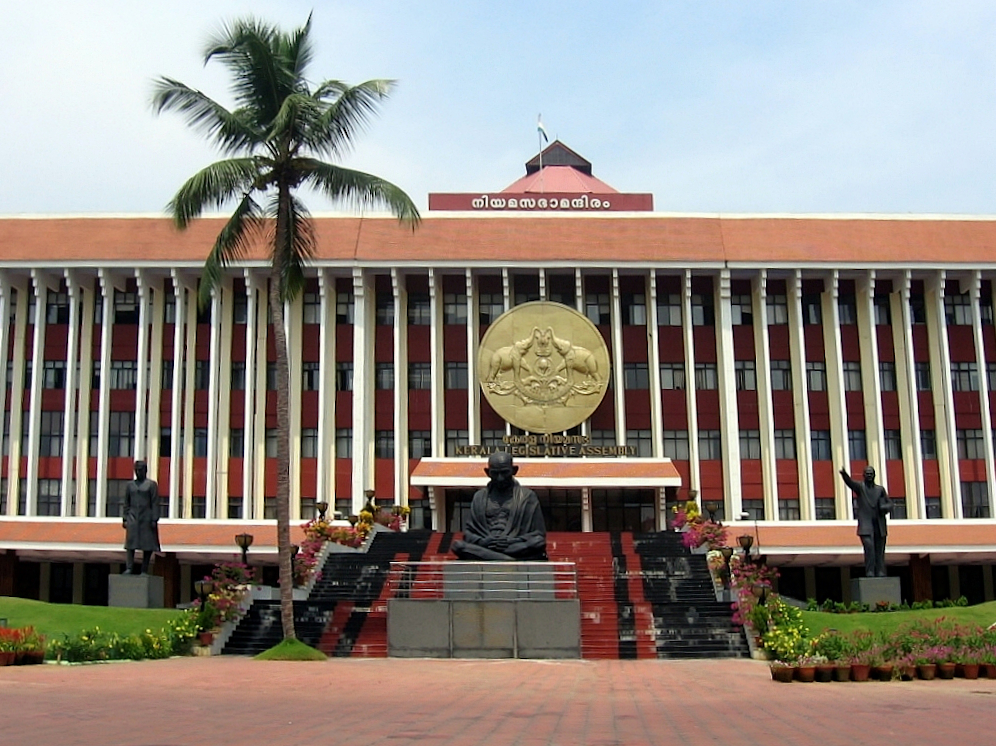
Niyamasabha Mandiram (Kerala)

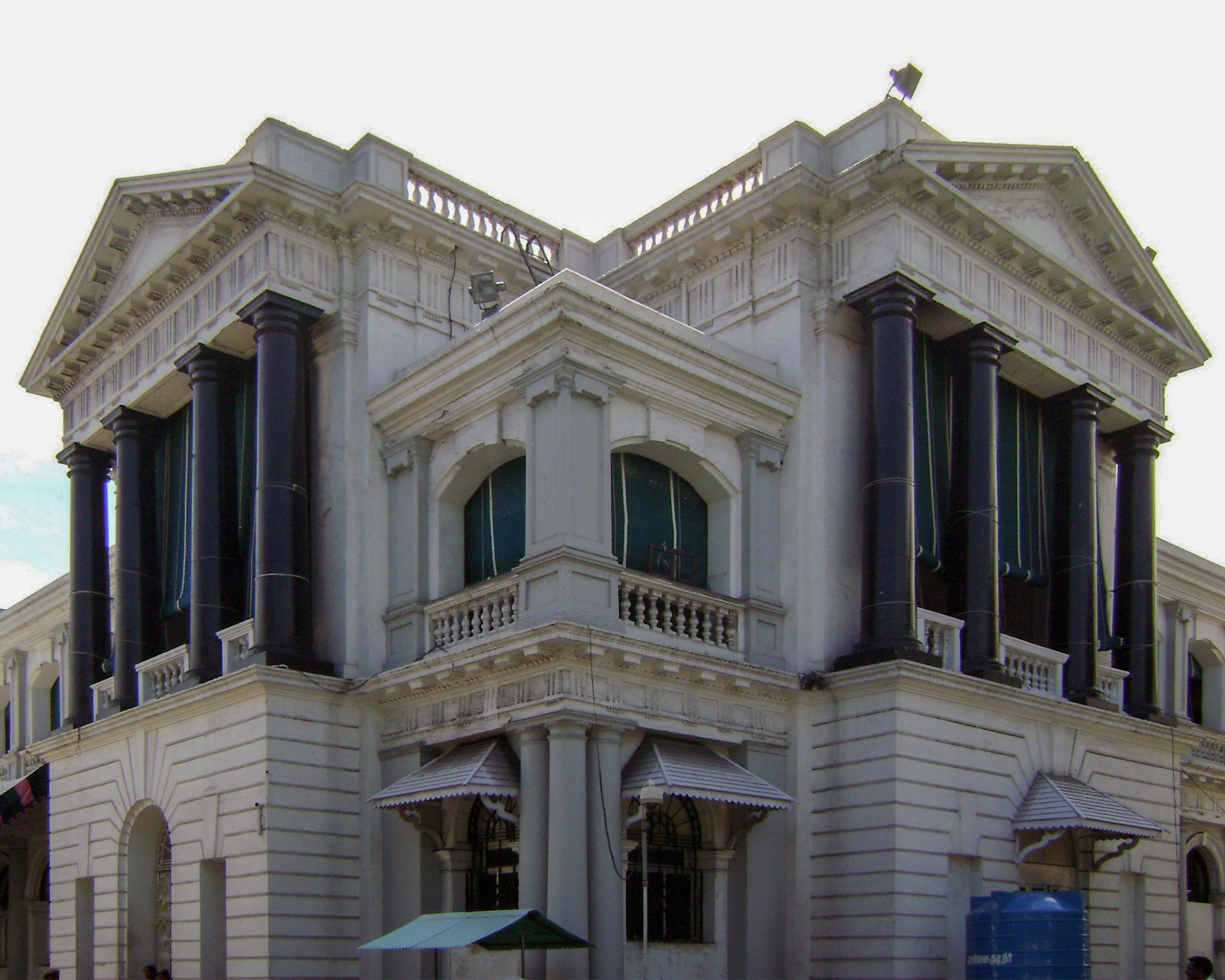
Fort St. George (Tamil Nadu)

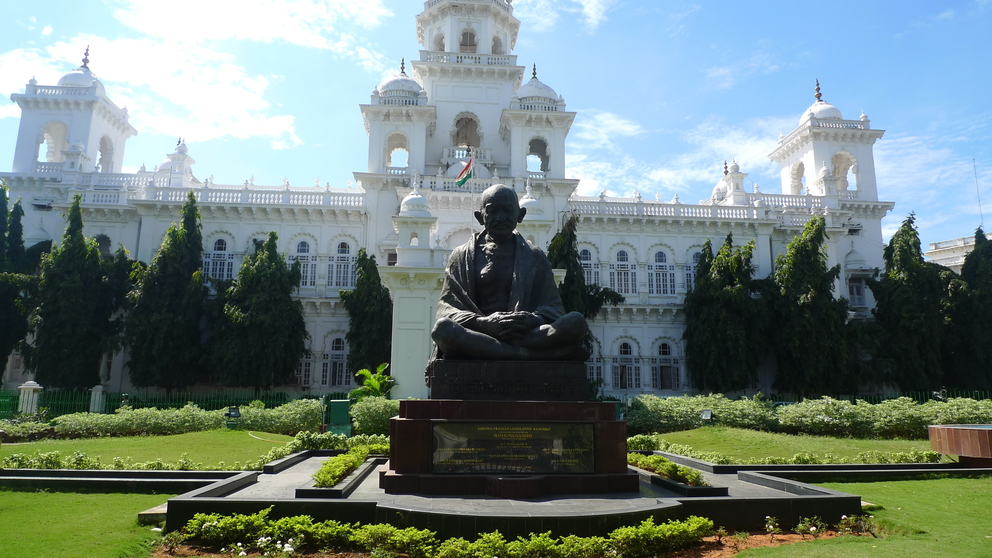
Shasana Sabha (Telangana)

South India elects 132 members to the Lok Sabha, accounting for roughly one-fourth of the total strength. The region is allocated 58 seats in the Rajya Sabha, out of the total of 245.

The state legislatures of Tamil Nadu, Kerala and Puducherry are unicameral, while Andhra Pradesh, Karnataka, and Telangana have bicameral legislatures. States with bicameral legislatures have an upper house (Legislative Council) with members not more than one-third the size of the Assembly. State legislatures elect members for terms of five years. Governors may suspend or dissolve assemblies and can administer when no party is able to form a government.

State/UT	Lok Sabha	Rajya Sabha	State Assembly	Governor/Lt. Governor	Chief Minister
Andhra Pradesh	25	11	175 (Note: legislative council seats 58)	S. Abdul Nazeer	N. Chandrababu Naidu
Karnataka	28	12	224 (Note: legislative council seats 70)	Thawar Chand Gehlot	Siddaramaiah
Kerala	20	9	140	Rajendra Arlekar	V. D. Satheesan
Lakshadweep	1	—N/a	—N/a	Praful Khoda Patel	—N/a
Puducherry	1	1	30	Kuniyil Kailashnathan	N. Rangaswamy
Tamil Nadu	39	18	234	Rajendra Arlekar	C. Joseph Vijay
Telangana	17	7	119 (Note: legislative council seats 40)	Shiv Pratap Shukla	Revanth Reddy
Total	132	58	922		

== Demographics ==
As per the 2011 census of India, the estimated population of South India was 252 million, around one fifth of the total population of the country. The region's total fertility rate (TFR) was less than the population replacement level of 2.1 set by the United Nations, with Kerala and Tamil Nadu having the lowest TFRs in India at 1.7. As a result, the proportion of the population of South India to India's total population has shown a declining trend from 1981 to 2011. Scheduled Castes and Tribes form 18% of the population of the region. Agriculture is the major employer in the region, with 47.5% of the population being involved in agrarian activities. About 60% of the population lives in permanent housing structures. In 2011, about 67.8% of the people in South India had access to tap water, with wells and springs being major sources of water supply.

After experiencing fluctuations in the decades immediately after the independence of India, the economies of South Indian states have, over the past three decades, registered growth higher than the national average. While South Indian states have improved in some of the socio-economic metrics, poverty continues to affect the region as it does the rest of the country, although it has considerably decreased over the years. The HDI in the southern states is high, and the economy has grown at a faster rate than those of most northern states.

As per the 2011 census, the average literacy rate in South India is approximately 80%, considerably higher than the Indian national average of 74%, with Kerala having the highest literacy rate of 93.91%. South India has a higher sex ratio than the national average with Kerala and Tamil Nadu being the top two states in the country. The South Indian states rank amongst the top half in economic freedom, access to electricity, access to drinking water, house ownership, TV ownership, and lower poverty rate. In early 2010s, the average per capita income of the South Indian states was ₹19,531 (US$210), more than double of the average of other Indian states (₹8,951 (US$96)). Of the three demographically related targets of the Millennium Development Goals set by the United Nations and expected to be achieved by 2015, Kerala and Tamil Nadu achieved the goals related to improvement of maternal health and of reducing infant mortality and child mortality by 2009.

State	Population	Males	Females	Sex Ratio	Literacy %	Rural Population	Urban Population	Density (/km^{2})
Andhra Pradesh	49,386,799	24,738,068	24,648,731	996	67.41	34,776,389	14,610,410	308
Karnataka	61,130,704	30,966,657	30,128,640	973	75.36	37,469,335	23,625,962	319
Kerala	33,406,061	16,027,412	17,378,649	1084	96.2	17,471,135	15,934,926	859
Lakshadweep	64,473	33,123	31,350	946	91.85	14,141	50,332	2,013
Puducherry	1,247,953	612,511	635,442	1037	86.55	395,200	852,753	2,598
Tamil Nadu	72,147,030	36,137,975	36,009,055	996	82.9	37,229,590	34,917,440	555
Telangana	35,003,674	17,611,633	17,392,041	988	72.80	21,395,009	21,395,009	312

=== Languages ===
Languages of South India (2011 census):
1. Telugu (31.1%)
2. Tamil (27.0%)
3. Kannada (16.8%)
4. Malayalam (13.5%)
5. Urdu (6.09%)
6. Others (5.53%)

The largest linguistic group in South India is the Dravidian family of languages, consisting of approximately 73 languages. The major languages spoken include Telugu, Tamil, Kannada, and Malayalam. Deccani Urdu a regional dialect of Urdu spoken in the region. Other minor languages include Konkani and Tulu. English is widely spoken in urban areas. Kannada, Konkani, Malayalam, Tamil, Telugu, and Urdu are amongst the 22 official languages of India. Tamil was the first language to be granted classical language status by the Government of India in 2004. Later, Telugu (2008), Kannada (2008) and Malayalam (2013) were also declared as classical languages. These four languages combined have a higher literary output than the combined output of all other literary languages of India.

S.No.	Language	Number of speakers (2011)	States and union territories where official
1	Telugu	78,631,655	Andhra Pradesh, Telangana, Puducherry
2	Tamil	68,239,659	Tamil Nadu, Puducherry
3	Kannada	42,560,250	Karnataka
4	Malayalam	34,104,225	Kerala, Lakshadweep, Puducherry
5	Urdu	15,411,542	Telangana
6	Konkani	1,655,065	Karnataka, Kerala

=== Religion ===
Evidence of prehistoric religion in South India comes from scattered Mesolithic rock paintings depicting dances and rituals, such as the Kupgal petroglyphs of eastern Karnataka, at Stone Age sites. Hinduism, regarded as one of the oldest religions. is the major religion in South India, with about 82.6% of the population adhering to it. Its major spiritual traditions include Shaivism and Vaishnavism, although Buddhist and Jain philosophies were also influential earlier. Ayyavazhi originated in South India in the 19th century.

Islam was introduced to the Malabar Coast in the early 7th century CE by the Arab traders, and spread during the rule of the Deccan Sultanates, in the 17th and 18th centuries. As of 2011, about 11.6% of the population In South India follow the religion. Christianity was introduced to South India by Thomas the Apostle, who visited Muziris in Kerala in 52 CE and proselytised the natives. As of 2011, about 5.1% of the population follow the religion. Kerala is also home to one of the oldest Jewish communities in the world, who are supposed to have arrived on the Malabar coast during the reign of King Solomon.

=== Largest cities ===
Largest cities or towns in South India
Rank		State	Pop.
1	Bengaluru	Karnataka	15,257,000
2	Chennai	Tamil Nadu	11,570,000
3	Hyderabad	Telangana	9,797,000
4	Kozhikode	Kerala	3,049,000
5	Thiruvananthapuram	Kerala	2,851,000
6	Coimbatore	Tamil Nadu	2,551,000
7	Kochi	Kerala	2,381,000
8	Madurai	Tamil Nadu	2,048,000
9	Visakhapatnam	Andhra Pradesh	2,005,000
10	Malappuram	Kerala	1,868,000

== Transport ==
Highway distribution with population density

=== Road ===
South India has an extensive road network with 23,304 km (14,480 mi) of National Highways and 49,927 km (31,023 mi) of State Highways. The Golden Quadrilateral connecting Chennai with Mumbai and Kolkata traverses Tamil Nadu, Karnataka and Andhra Pradesh. Bus services are provided by state-run transport corporations, namely the Andhra Pradesh State Road Transport Corporation, Tamil Nadu State Transport Corporation, Karnataka State Road Transport Corporation, Telangana State Road Transport Corporation, Kerala State Road Transport Corporation, and Puducherry Road Transport Corporation.

State	National Highway	State Highway	Motor vehicles per 1000 pop.
Andhra Pradesh	7,356 km (4,571 mi)	10,650 km (6,620 mi)	145
Karnataka	6,432 km (3,997 mi)	20,774 km (12,908 mi)	182
Tamil Nadu	5,006 km (3,111 mi)	10,764 km (6,688 mi)	257
Telangana	2,635 km (1,637 mi)	3,152 km (1,959 mi)	N/A
Kerala	1,811 km (1,125 mi)	4,341 km (2,697 mi)	425
Puducherry	64 km (40 mi)	246 km (153 mi)	521
Total	23,304 km (14,480 mi)	49,927 km (31,023 mi)	

=== Rail ===
In 1832, the proposal to construct the first railway line in India at Madras was made. In 1835, a railway track was constructed between Red Hills and Chintadripet in Madras and became operational in 1837. The Madras Railway was established in 1845. The Great Southern of India Railway Company was founded in England in 1853 and registered in 1859. The construction on the first main line in the South between Royapuram in Madras and Arcot started in 1853, which became operational on 1 July 1856. Construction of track in the Madras Presidency began in 1859 and the 80 miles (130 km) link from Trichinopoly to Negapatam and a link from Tirur to the Port of Beypore at Kozhikode on the Malabar Coast, which eventually got expanded into the Mangalore-Chennai line via Palakkad Gap were opened in 1861. The Carnatic Railway Company was founded in 1864 and opened a Madras–Arakkonam–Conjeevaram–Katpadi junction line in 1865. These two companies subsequently merged in 1874 to form the South Indian Railway Company. In 1880, the Great Indian Peninsula Railway, established by the British, built a railway network radiating from Madras. In 1879, the Madras Railway constructed a line from Royapuram to Bangalore; and the Maharaja of Mysore established the Mysore State Railway to build an extension from Bangalore to Mysore. The Madras and Southern Mahratta Railway was founded on 1 January 1908 by merging the Madras Railway and the Southern Mahratta Railway.

On 14 April 1951, the Madras and Southern Mahratta Railway, the South Indian Railway, and the Mysore State Railway were merged to form the Southern Railway, the first zone of Indian Railways. The South Central zone was created on 2 October 1966 as the ninth zone of Indian Railways and the South Western zone was created on 1 April 2003. Most of the region is covered by the three zones, with small portions of the coasts covered by East Coast Railway and Konkan Railway. In 2019, the South Coast Railway zone was formed and it became operational on 1 June 2026. The Nilgiri Mountain Railway of Southern Railway is a UNESCO World Heritage Site. Indian Railways under the ownership of the Ministry of Railways of the Government of India operates the railway system.

Railway zone	Abbr.	Route length (km)	Headquarters	Estd.	Divisions	Major stations
Southern	SR	5,087	Chennai	14 April 1951	Chennai, Madurai, Palakkad, Salem, Thiruvananthapuram, Tiruchirappalli	Chennai Central, Chennai Egmore, Tambaram, Coimbatore Jn., Madurai Jn., Thiruvananthapuram Central, Ernakulam Jn., Kozhikode, Katpadi Jn., Thrissur, Arakkonam Jn., Chengalpattu Jn., Tiruvallur, Avadi, Tiruchirappalli Jn., Tirunelveli Jn., Salem Jn., Tiruppur, Palakkad Jn., Erode Jn., Kannur, Nagercoil Jn., Ernakulam Town, Kollam Jn., Mangalore Central
South Central	SCR	3,572	Secunderabad	2 October 1966	Hyderabad, Secunderabad	Secunderabad Jn., Hyderabad, Kacheguda, Warangal
South Western	SWR	3,629	Huballi	1 April 2003	Bengaluru, Hubli, Mysuru	KSR Bengaluru, Mysore Jn., Yesvantpur Jn., Huballi Jn.
South Coast	SCoR	3,532	Visakhapatnam	1 June 2026	Guntakal, Guntur, Vijayawada, Visakhapatnam	Guntakal Jn., Guntur Jn., Kakinada Town, Nellore, Rajahmundry, Tenali Jn., Tirupati, Vijayawada Jn., Visakhapatnam Jn.

==== Suburban and Metro ====
As of 2026, metro systems are operational in four cities of South India: Chennai, Bengaluru, Hyderabad and Kochi. The Chennai Suburban railway, opened in 1928, is one of the oldest and largest urban networks in the country. Inaugurated in 1995, Chennai MRTS was the first elevated urban railway in India. Hyderabad MMTS was opened in 2003, becoming the second city in South India to have a local rail transit system. As of December 2022, South India has 205.06 km of operational metro lines and 16 systems.

System	City	State	Image	Lines	Stations	Length	Opened
Chennai Suburban	Chennai	Tamil Nadu		3	53	212 km (132 mi)	1928
Chennai MRTS	Chennai	Tamil Nadu		1	17	19.715 km (12.250 mi)	1995
Hyderabad MMTS	Hyderabad	Telangana		2	44	90 km (56 mi)	2003
Namma Metro	Bengaluru	Karnataka		2	63	69.6 km (43.2 mi)	2011
Chennai Metro	Chennai	Tamil Nadu		2	41	54.1 km (33.6 mi)	2015
Kochi Metro	Kochi	Kerala		1	22	25.6 km (15.9 mi)	2017
Hyderabad Metro	Hyderabad	Telangana		3	57	69.2 km (43.0 mi)	2017

=== Air ===
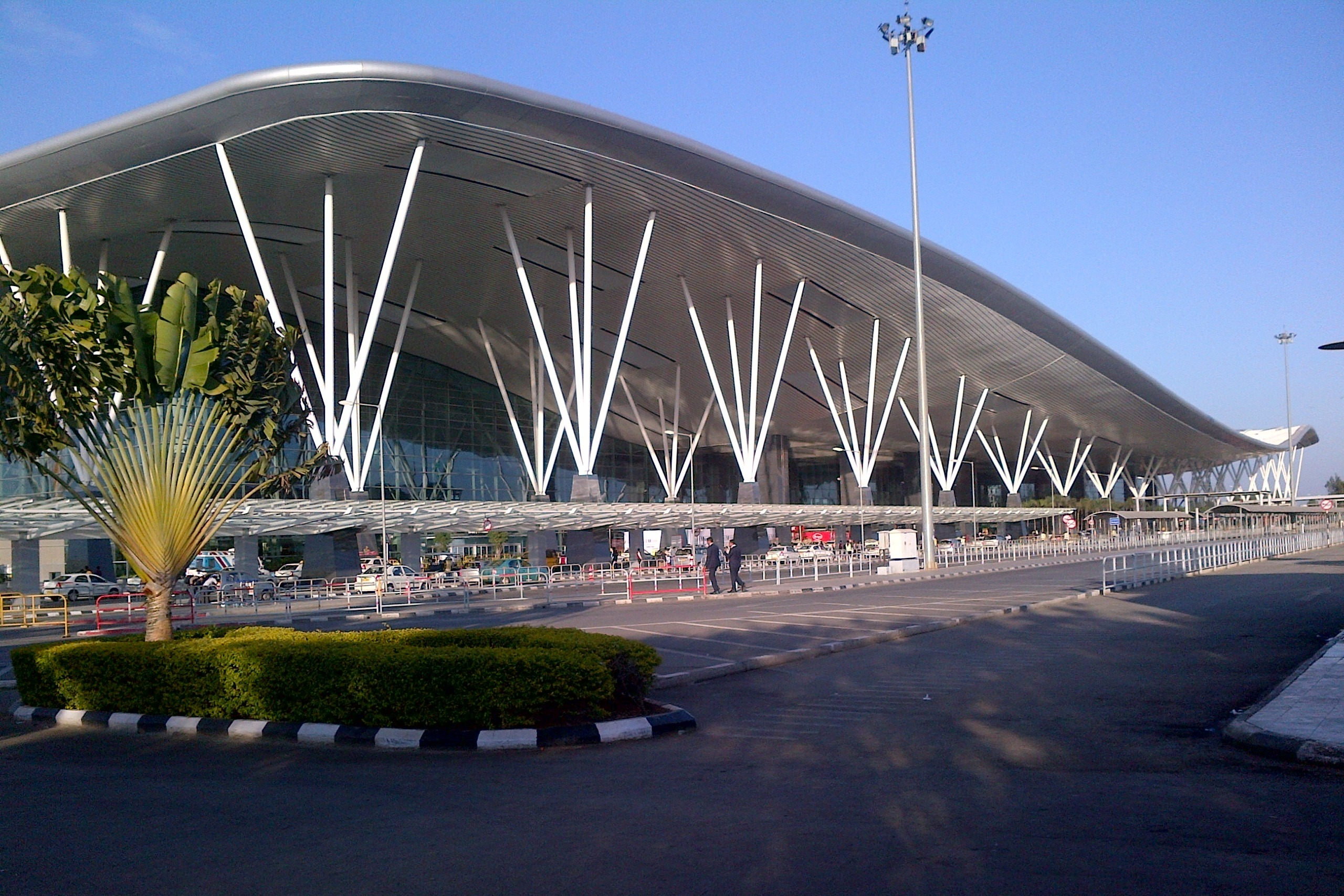
Kempegowda International Airport, Bengaluru

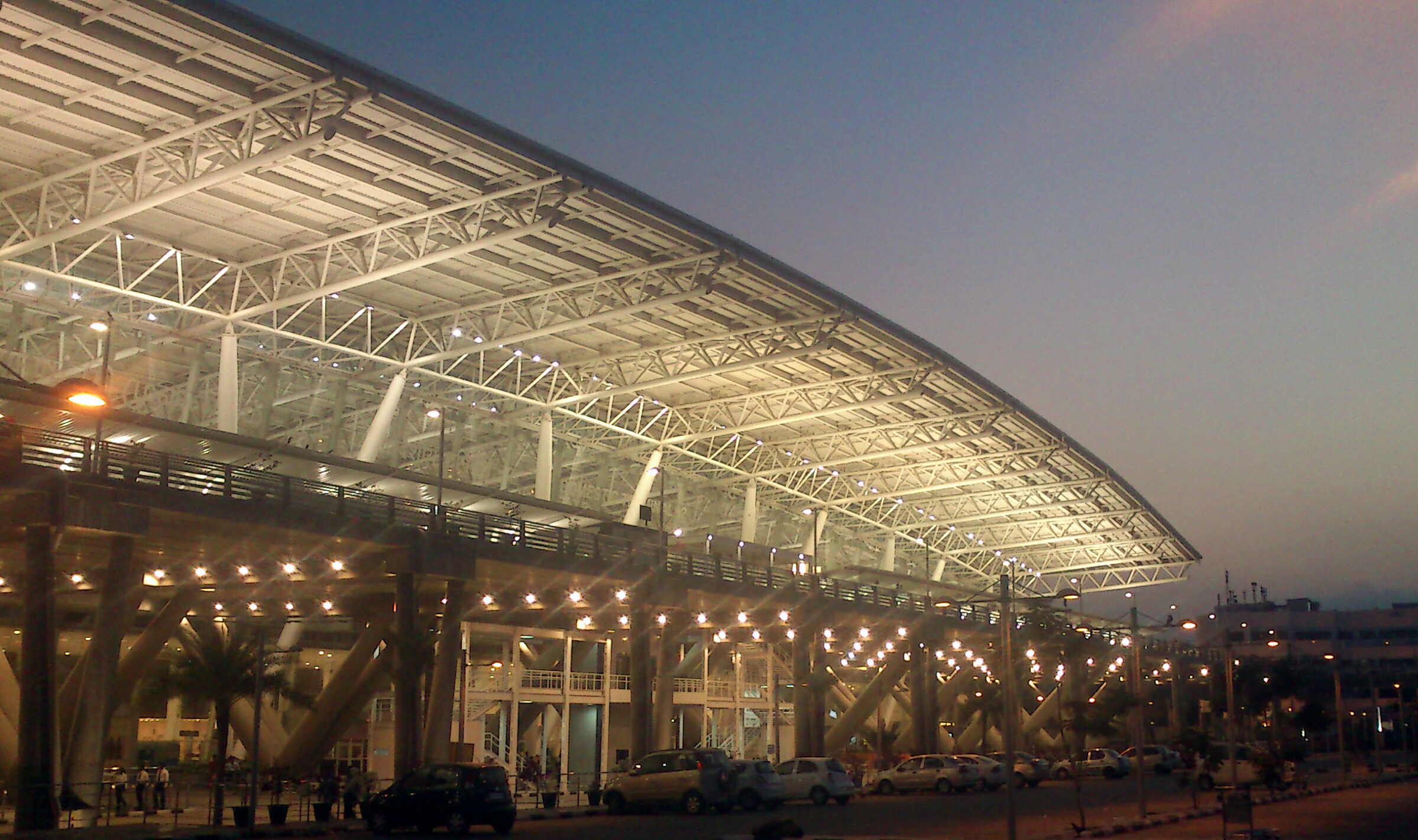
Chennai International Airport

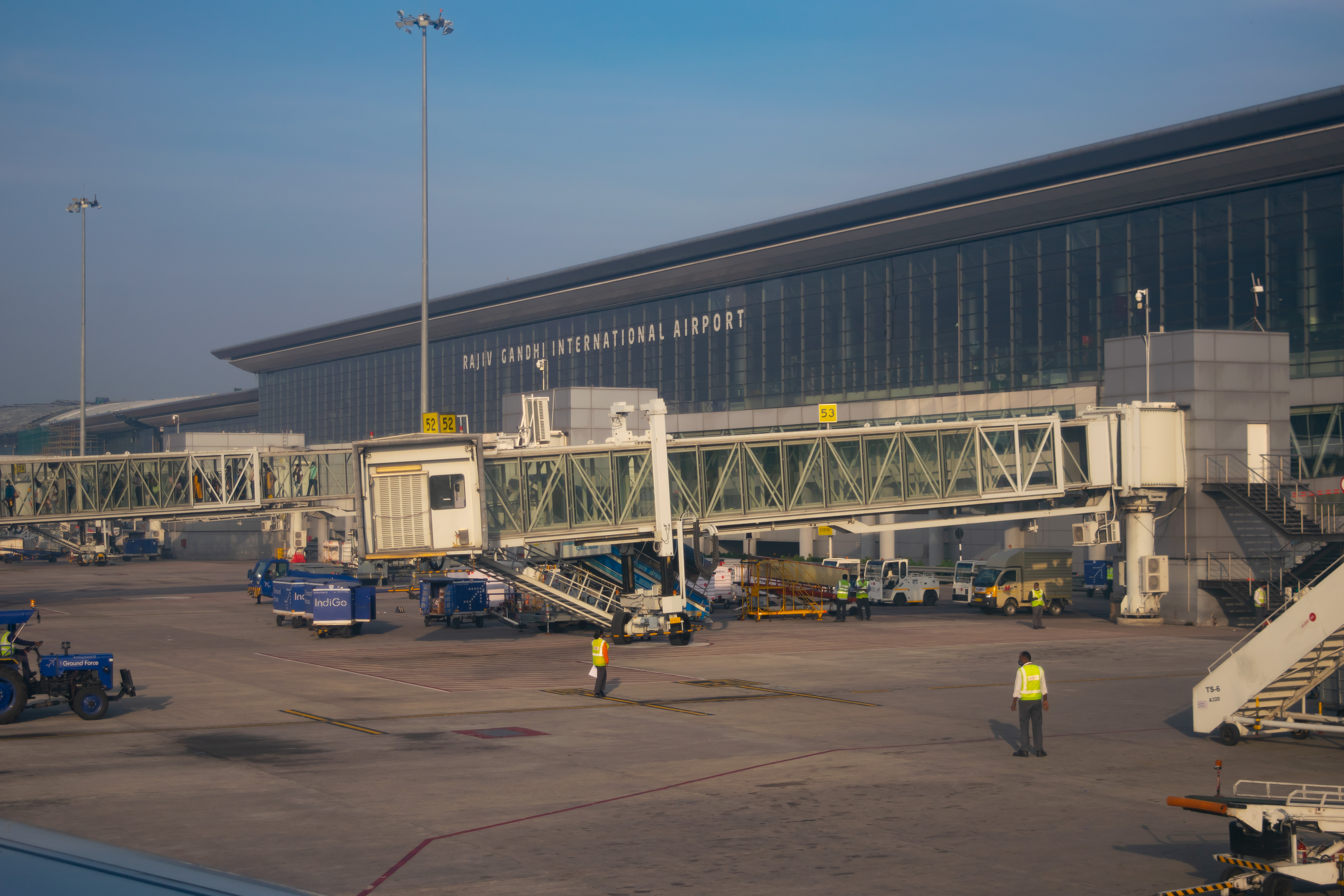
Rajiv Gandhi International Airport, Hyderabad

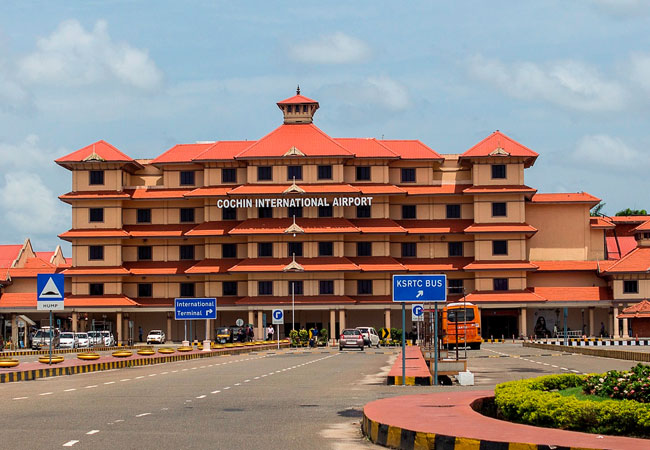
Cochin International Airport

In 1915, Tata Sons started a regular airmail service between Karachi and Madras marking the beginning of air transportation in the southern part of India. In March 1930, a discussion initiated by pilot G. Vlasto led to the founding of the Madras Flying Club, which became a pioneer in pilot training in South India. On 15 October 1932, Indian aviator J. R. D. Tata flew a Puss Moth aircraft carrying mail from Karachi to Juhu aerodrome, Bombay; and the aircraft continued to Madras, piloted by Neville Vincent, a former Royal Air Force pilot and friend of Tata.

There are 12 international airports, 2 customs airports, 15 domestic airports, 5 state owned/private airports and 15 air bases in South India. Bengaluru, Chennai, Hyderabad, and Kochi international airports are amongst the 10 busiest in the country. Chennai International Airport serves as the Southern Regional Headquarters of the Airports Authority of India, the Southern Region comprising the states of Andhra Pradesh, Karnataka, Kerala, Tamil Nadu, and Telangana, and the union territories of Puducherry and Lakshadweep. Four of the ten busiest airports in India are in South India.

The region comes under the purview of the Southern Air Command of the Indian Air Force headquartered at Thiruvananthapuram. In addition, the National Training Command is headquartered at Bengaluru. The Air Force operates nine air bases in Southern India. In the region, the Indian Navy operates airbases at Kochi, Arakkonam, Uchipuli, Vizag and Chennai.

State/UT	International	Customs	Domestic	State/Private	Military
Andhra Pradesh	2	1	3	1	1
Karnataka	2	0	4	4	3
Kerala	4	0	0	0	2
Lakshadweep	0	0	1	0	0
Puducherry	0	0	1	0	0
Tamil Nadu	3	1	3	0	6
Telangana	1	0	3	0	3
Total	12	2	15	5	15

Rank	Name	City	State	IATA Code	Total passengers (Apr-Jul'24)
1	Kempegowda International Airport	Bengaluru	Karnataka	BLR	1,35,63,383
2	Rajiv Gandhi International Airport	Hyderabad	Telangana	HYD	90,75,887
3	Chennai International Airport	Chennai	Tamil Nadu	MAA	72,52,642
4	Cochin International Airport	Kochi	Kerala	COK	36,59,362
5	Thiruvananthapuram International Airport	Thiruvananthapuram	Kerala	TRV	16,54,523
6	Calicut International Airport	Kozhikode	Kerala	CCJ	12,46,845
7	Coimbatore International Airport	Coimbatore	Tamil Nadu	CJB	10,39,954
8	Visakhapatnam International Airport	Visakhapatnam	Andhra Pradesh	VTZ	9,14,742
9	Mangalore International Airport	Mangaluru	Karnataka	IXE	7,34,128
10	Tiruchirappalli International Airport	Tiruchirappalli	Tamil Nadu	TRZ	6,52,780

=== Water ===
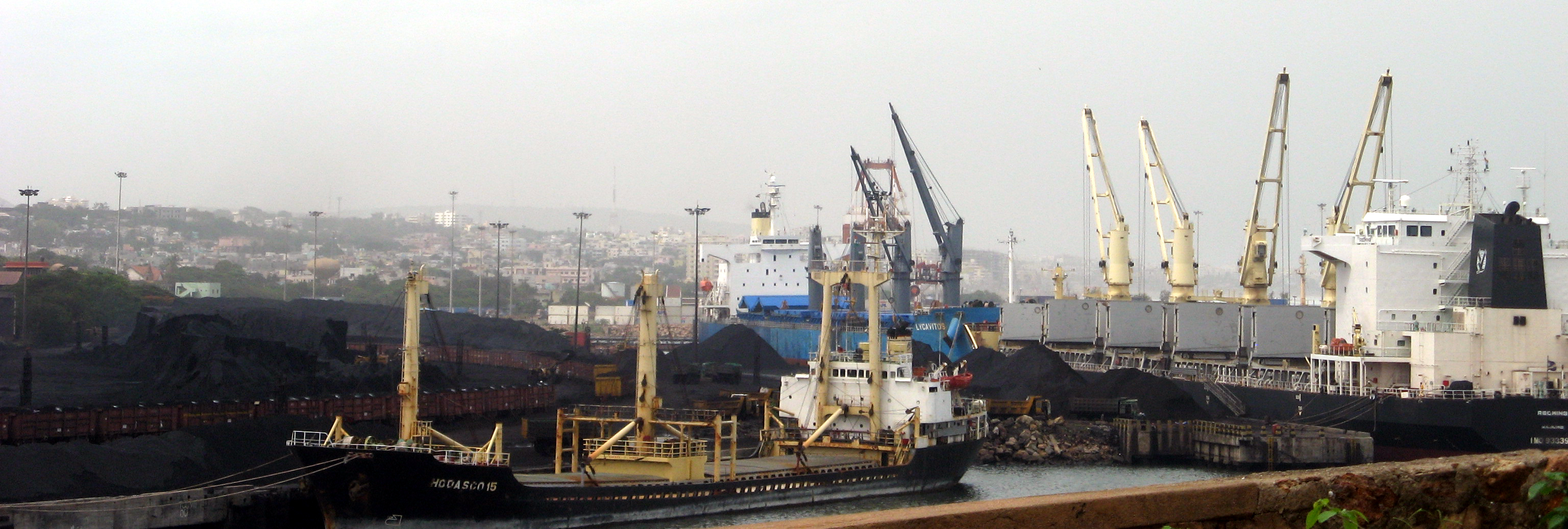
Vishakhapatnam harbour

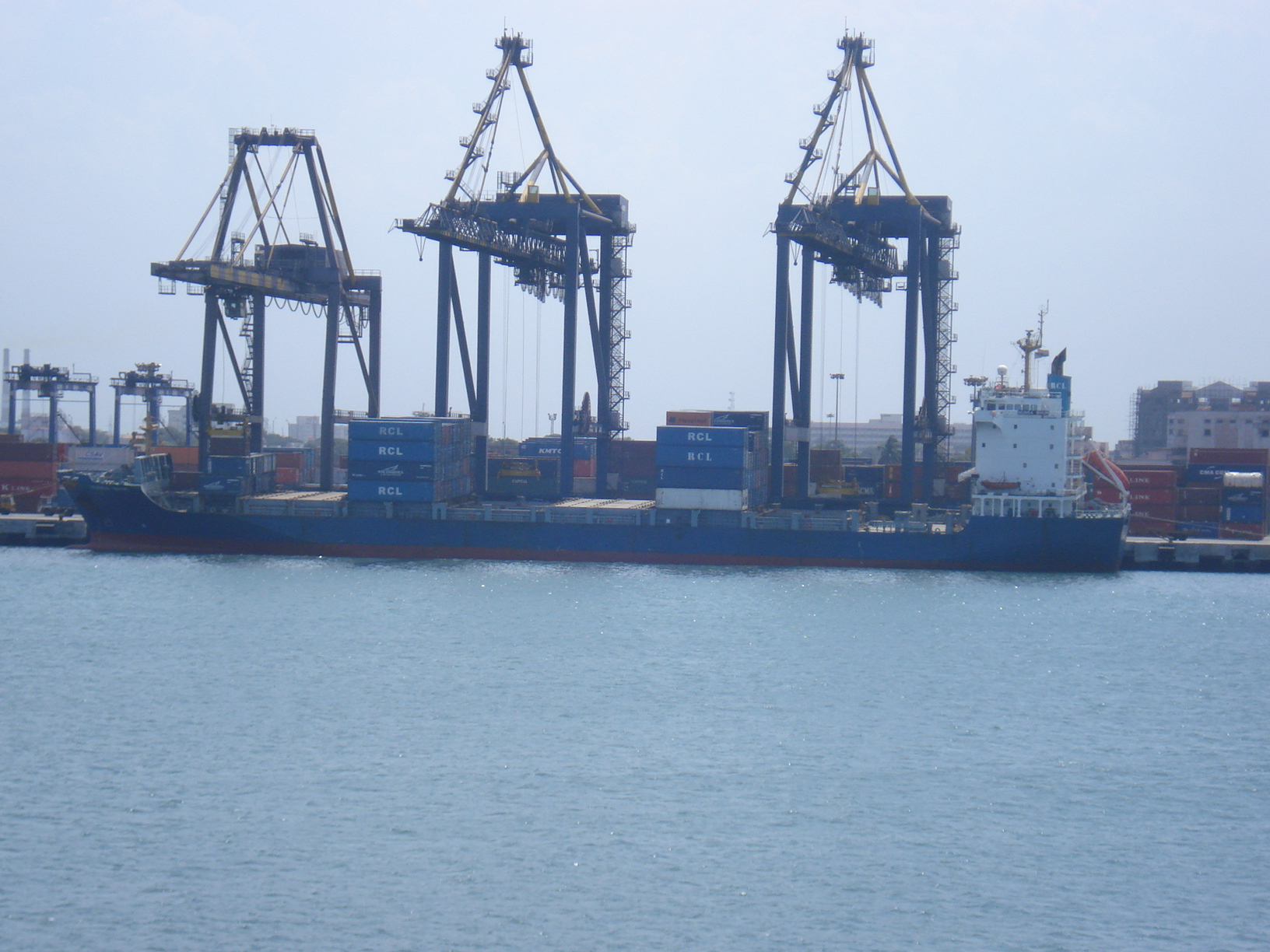
Chennai Port

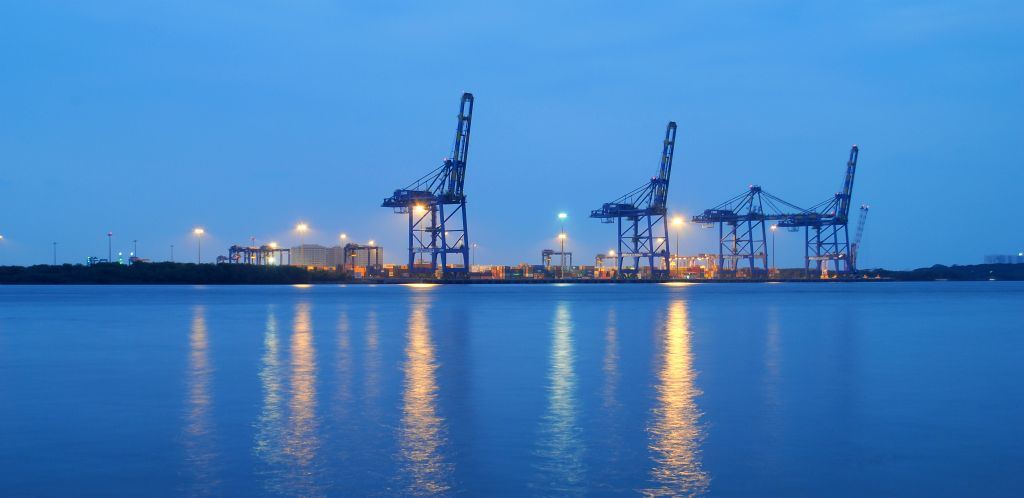
Kochi Port

The region is covered by water on three sides and has a long coastline. A total of 67 ports are situated in South India: Tamil Nadu (18), Kerala (14), Andhra Pradesh (13), Karanataka (11), Lakshadweep (10) and Pondicherry (1). Major ports include Visakhapatnam, Chennai, Mangalore, Tuticorin, Ennore and Kochi.

Name	City	State	Cargo Handled (MT) (FY2021–22)	Passengers (FY2022–23)
Visakhapatnam Port	Visakhapatnam	Andhra Pradesh	69.03	Nil
Chennai Port	Chennai	Tamil Nadu	48.56	88,596
New Mangalore Port	Mangalore	Karnataka	39.30	1,440
Kamarajar Port	Chennai	Tamil Nadu	38.74	Nil
Cochin Port	Kochi	Kerala	34.55	26,550
V.O. Chidambaranar Port	Thoothukudi	Tamil Nadu	34.12	Nil

The Kerala backwaters are a network of interconnected canals, rivers, lakes, and inlets, a labyrinthine system formed by more than 900 km of waterways. The Eastern Naval Command and Southern Naval Command of the Indian Navy are headquartered at Visakhapatnam and Kochi respectively. In the region, the Indian Navy has its major operational bases at Visakhapatnam, Chennai, Kochi, Karwar, and Kavaratti. Kochi Water Metro is the first water metro service in India launched in 2023.

== Economy ==
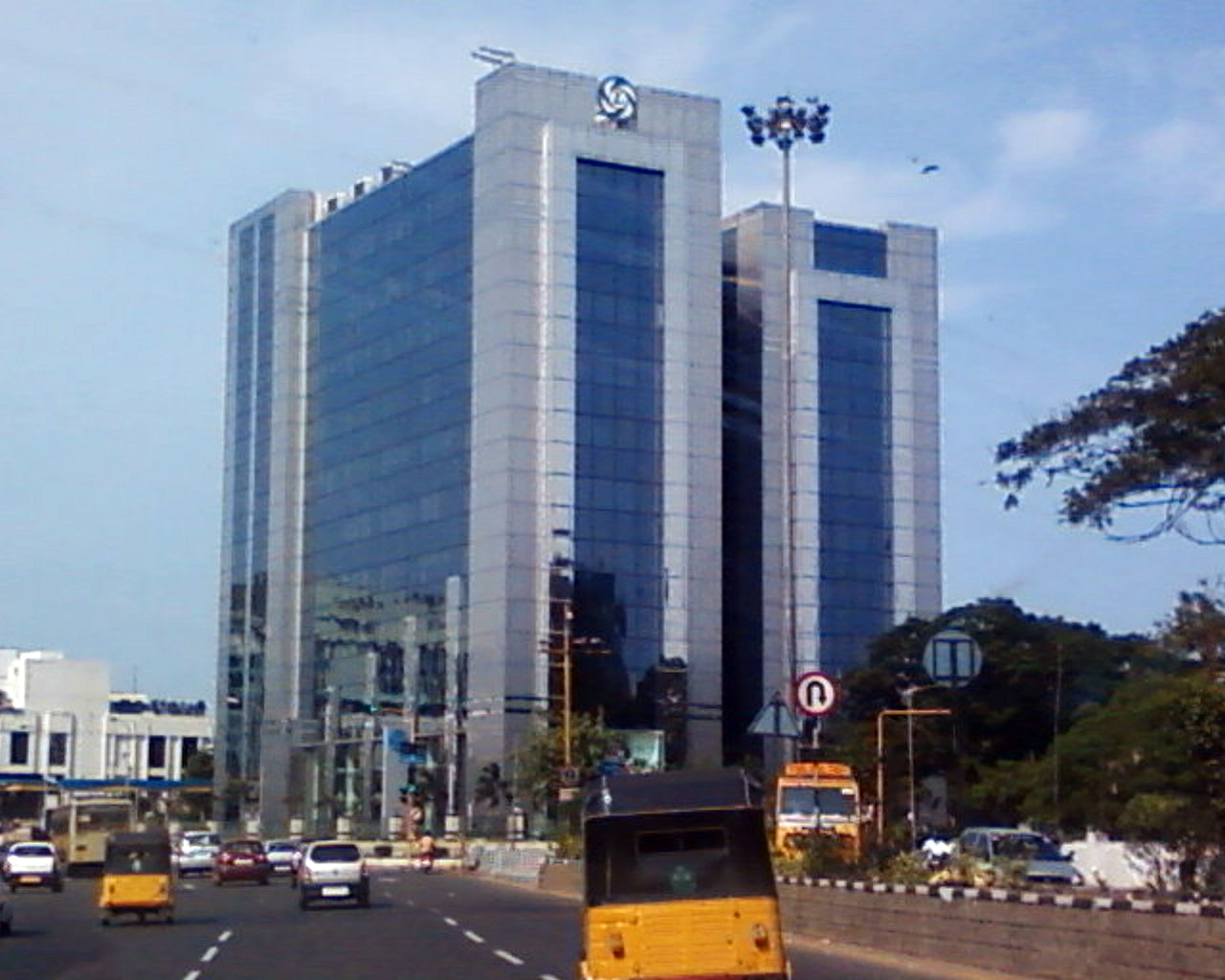
Chennai, known as the "Gateway to South India", is an automotive hub; Pictured is headquarters of Ashok Leyland

After independence, the economy of South India conformed to a socialist framework, with strict governmental control over private sector participation, foreign trade, and foreign direct investment. From 1960 to 1990, the South Indian economies experienced mixed economic growth. In the 1960s, Kerala achieved above-average growth while Andhra Pradesh's economy declined. Kerala experienced an economic decline in the 1970s while the economies of Karnataka, Tamil Nadu, and Andhra Pradesh consistently exceeded national average growth rates, due to reform-oriented economic policies. As of March 2015, there are 109 operational Special Economic Zones in South India, which is about 60% of the country's total. As of 2019–20, the total gross domestic product of the region is ₹67 trillion (US$946 billion). Tamil Nadu has the second-highest GDP and is the second-most industrialised state in the country after Maharashtra. With the presence of two major ports, an international airport, and a converging road and rail networks, Chennai is referred to as the "Gateway of South India". South India contributes 30% of India's GDP with a higher per capita income and lower debt-to-GDP ratio than the national average. According to the Globalization and World Cities Research Network, Bengaluru, Chennai and Hyderabad are amongst the most integrated with the global economy with Bengaluru classified as an alpha- city, Chennai as beta and Hyderabad as beta-.

Share of GDP (2019–20):
1. South India (30.6%)
2. Rest of India (69.4%)

List of South Indian states and territories by GDP and NDPS (2019–20)
State/Union Territory	All India Rank	GDP (Crore₹)	NSDP (Crore₹)
Tamil Nadu	2	17,97,228	16,19,720
Karnataka	5	16,28,927	14,75,277
Andhra Pradesh	8	9,71,224	8,70,064
Telangana	9	9,57,207	8,71,374
Kerala	11	8,54,689	7,73,099
Puducherry	26	38,003	34,578
South India		62,47,278	56,44,113

Economic and demographic indicators (2019–20)
Parameter	South India	All India
Gross domestic product (GDP)	₹62.5 trillion	₹207.7 trillion
Net state domestic product (SDP)	₹56.4 trillion	₹186.4 trillion
Population below the poverty line	15.4%	26.1%
Urban population	32.8%	27.8%
Households with electricity	98.9%	88.2%
Literacy rate	81.1%	74%

=== Agriculture ===
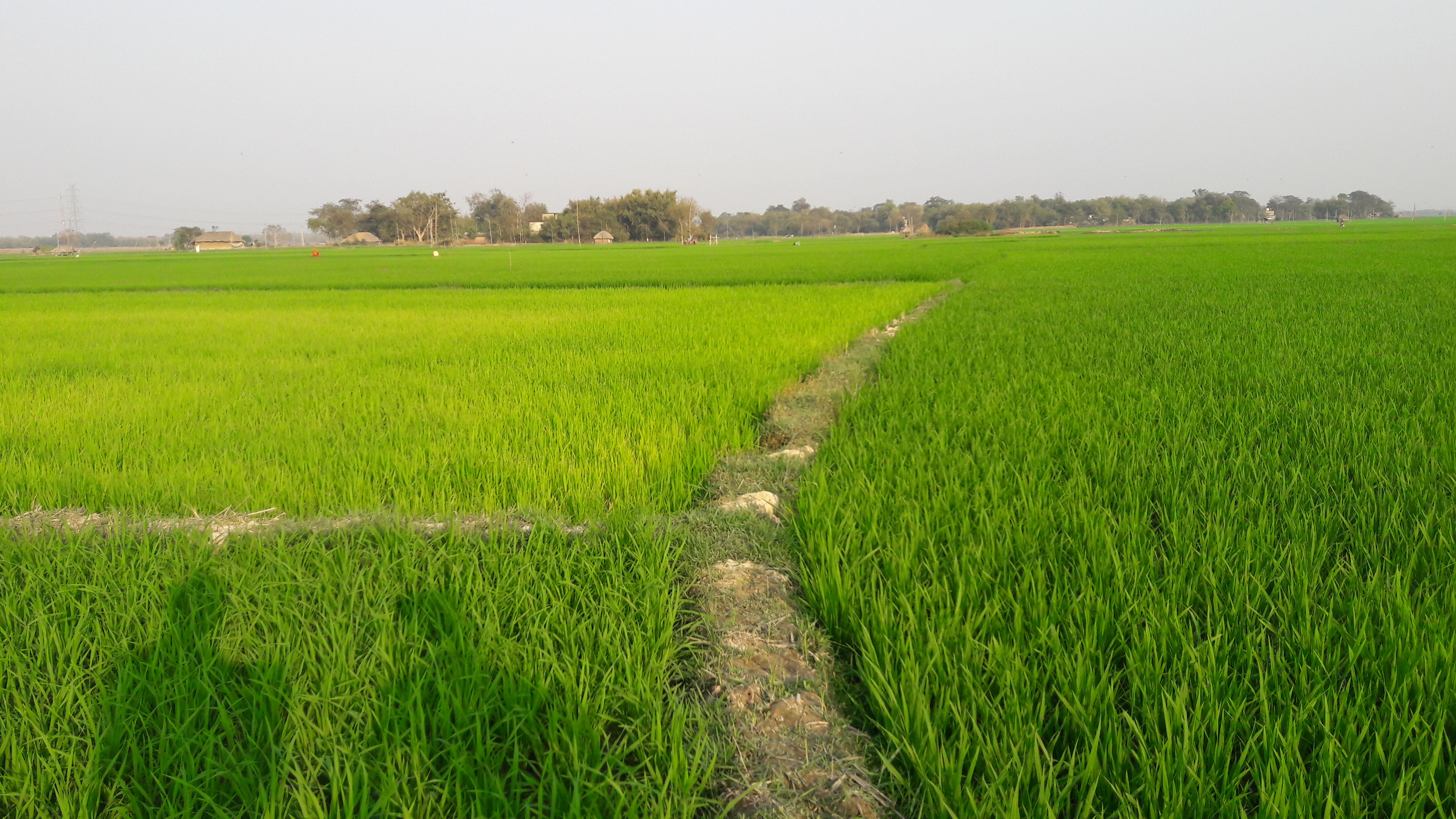
Rice is the staple and predominant crop.

Agriculture is the primary occupation in South India with nearly 5.31 crore people engaged in agriculture and allied activities in 2021. Rice is the staple food and major crop in the region. South India is a major producer of spices with black pepper, cardamom, clove and nutmeg grown exclusively in the region. Some of the main crops cultivated in South India include sugarcane, chilli, banana, cotton, turmeric, millets and pulses. Other plantation crops include cashew, coffee, tea, rubber, betel, areca nut, coconut, bamboo and cocoa. The region accounts for 92% of the coffee and 85% of the natural rubber production in the country.

Other major agricultural products include poultry and silk. Being a peninsular region, aquaculture is a major contributor to the economy. As of 2017–18, the region produced 53.68 lakh tonnes fish contributing to nearly 43% of total fish production in India. Like most of the Indian subcontinent, agriculture in the region is largely dependent on seasonal monsoons and monsoon failure often leads to droughts forcing farmers into debt, selling livestock and sometimes into committing suicide.

=== Information technology ===
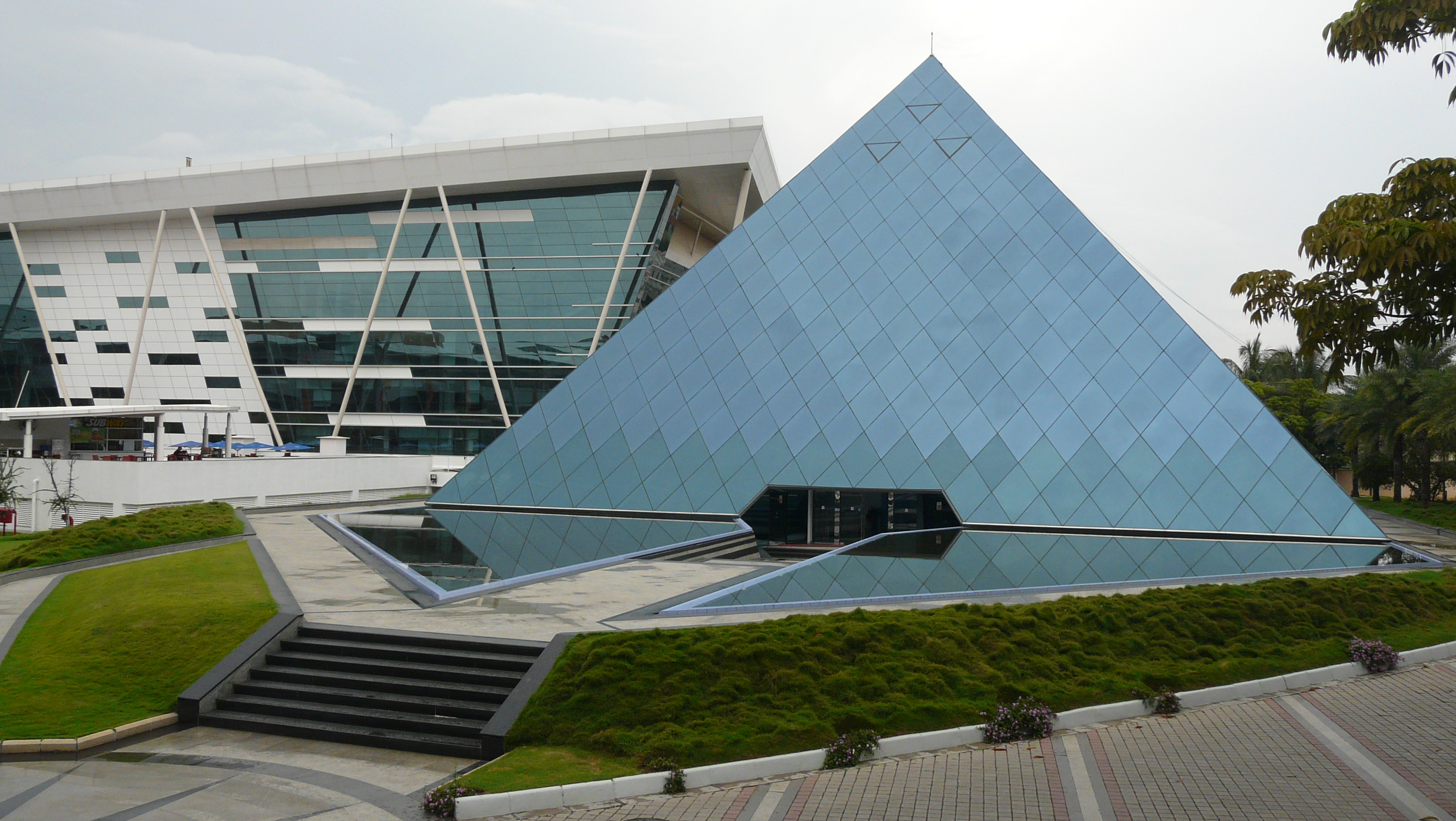
Bangalore is an alpha-city and a major information technology hub. Picture: Infosys

South India's urban centres are significant contributors to the Indian and global IT economy. Bengaluru, Chennai, Hyderabad, Coimbatore, Kochi and Thiruvananthapuram are amongst the major information technology (IT) hubs of India. The presence of these hubs has spurred economic growth and attracted foreign investments and job seekers from other parts of the country. Software exports from South India grossed over ₹640 billion (US$6.8 billion) in fiscal 2005–06.

=== Manufacturing ===
Manufacturing is various states are governed by state owned industrial corporations like APIIC (Andhra Pradesh), KIDC (Karnataka), KSIDC (Kerala), TIDC (Tamil Nadu) apart from central government owned companies. The automotive industry in Chennai accounts for about 35% of India's overall automotive components and automobile output with Andhra Pradesh is emerging as another automobile manufacturing hub. Coimbatore supplies two-thirds of India's requirements of motors and pumps, and is one of the largest exporters of wet grinders and auto components, as well as jewellery. Another major industry is textiles with the region being home to nearly 60% of the fiber textile mills in India. State owned companies include Bharat Electronics (electrical components), Bharat Heavy Electricals Limited (power equipments) and HMT (machine tools). Integral Coach Factory in Chennai, operated by Indian Railways is the oldest and largest producer of railway coaches and wagons.

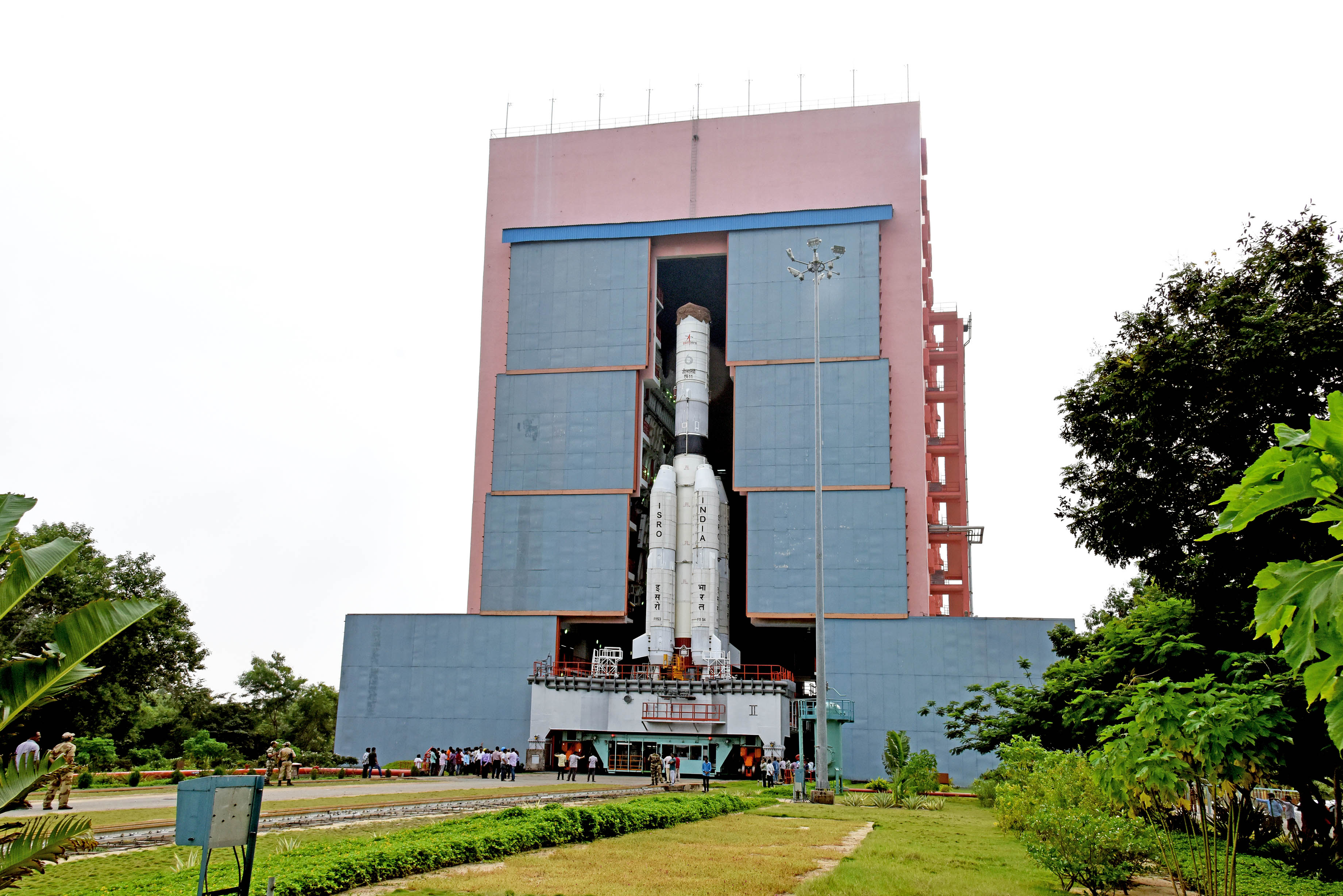
ISRO rocket launch station at Sriharikota near Chennai

=== Space and Defense ===
Defense establishments include Hindustan Aeronautics Limited in Bangalore which manufactures fighter aircraft, helicopters and aircraft components. DRDO which is India's premier defense agency operates various facilities in Chennai, Bangalore, Hyderabad and Mysuru in South India.

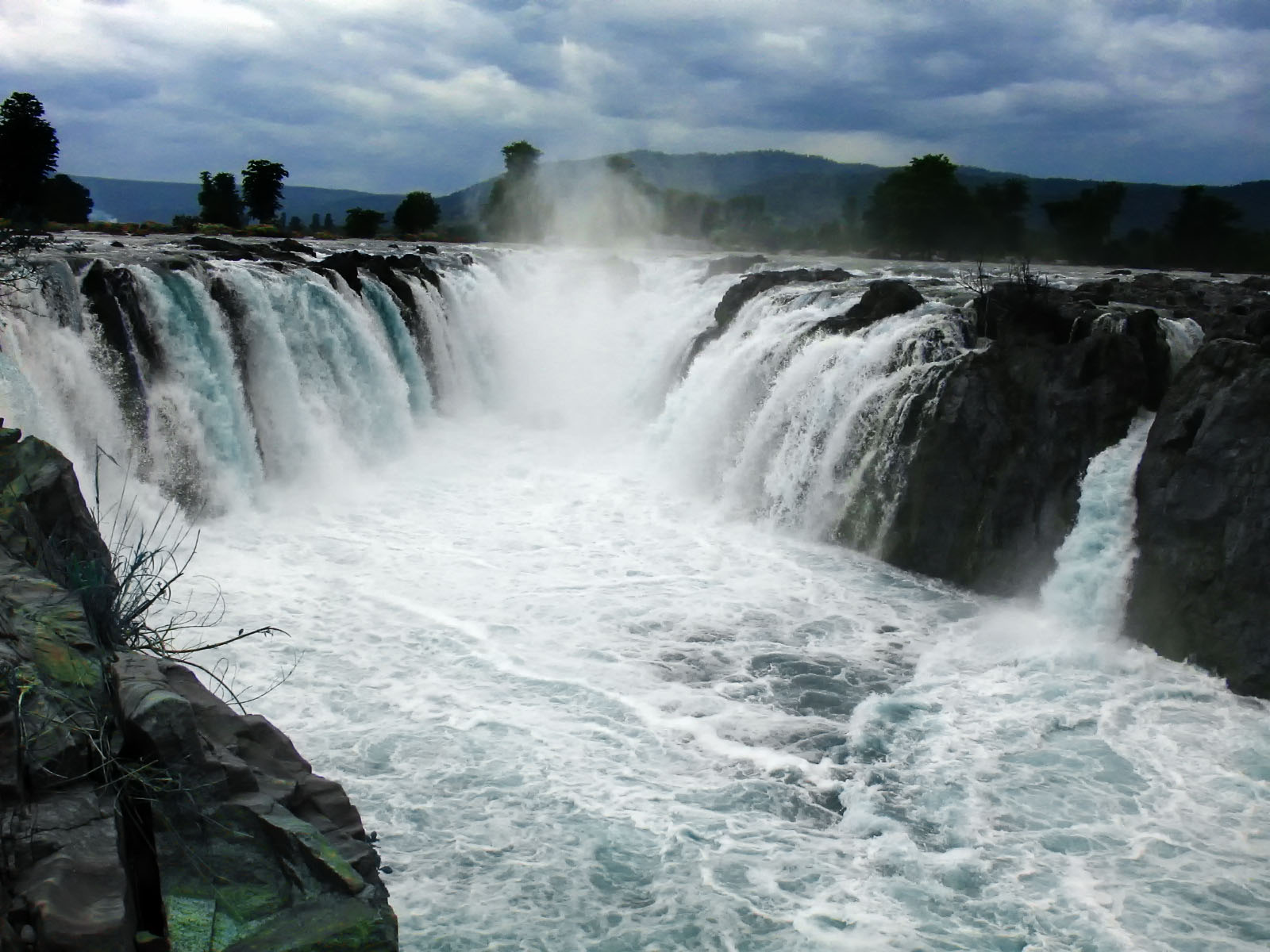
Hogenakkal Falls on the Kaveri river; Tourism contributes significantly to the GDP of the region

There are three Ordnance factories in Aruvankadu (Tamil Nadu), Tiruchirappalli and Medak. AVANI, headquartered in Chennai manufactures Armoured fighting vehicles, Main battle tanks, tank engines and armored clothing for the use of the Indian Armed Forces. Bharat Dynamics manufacturers of ammunitions and missile systems and is based in Hyderabad.

ISRO is the premier Indian space agency primarily responsible for performing tasks related to space-based operations, space exploration, international space cooperation and the development of related technologies. It is headquartered in Bangalore. It operates research facilities in Thiruvananthapuram and Tirupati, test facility at Mahendragiri, satellite development facilities at Bangalore, launch facilities at Sriharikota and Thiruvananthapuram, tracking facilities at Bangalore, Hyderabad and Hassan and Indian Institute of Space Science and Technology at Thiruvananthapuram.

=== Tourism ===
Tourism contributes significantly to the GDP of the region, with four states – Tamil Nadu, Andhra Pradesh, Karnataka, and Telangana – among the top 10 states for tourist arrivals, accounting for more than 50% of domestic tourist visits.

Tamil Nadu has the largest tourist inflow in India both domestic and international as of 2020. In 2023, Kerala was listed at the 13th spot in The New York Times' annual list of places to visit and was the only tourist destination listed from India. Kerala was named by TIME magazine in 2022 among the 50 extraordinary destinations to explore in its list of the World's Greatest Places.

== Culture and heritage ==
Majority of the region falls under the purview of South zone cultural center headquartered at Thanjavur, as per the classification of the ministry of culture of the Indian government, for the promotion and preservation of cultural heritage.

=== Clothing ===
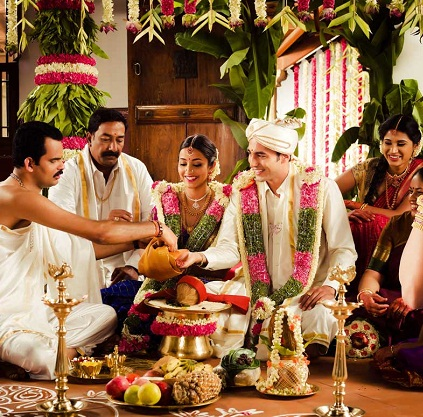
A wedding in traditional South Indian wear

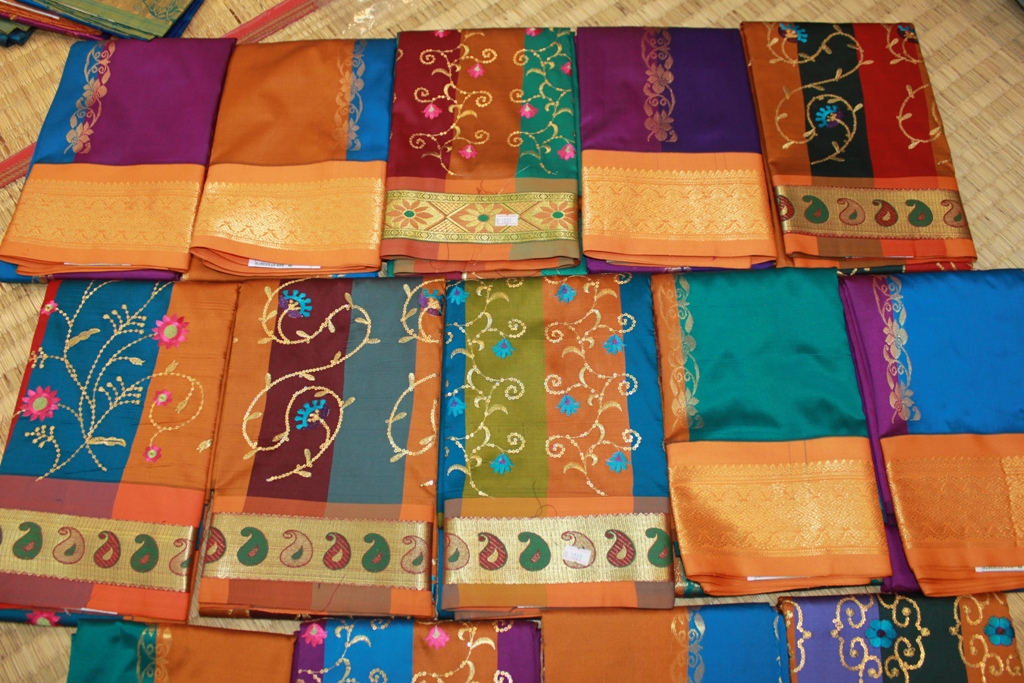
Kanchipuram silk saris worn by women on special occasions

South Indian women traditionally wear a sari, a garment that consists of a drape varying from 15–27 ft (4.6–8.2 m) in length and 2–4 ft (0.61–1.22 m) in breadth, and is typically wrapped around the waist, with one end draped over the shoulder, baring the midriff, as the navel is considered as the source of life and creativity in Indian philosophy. Ancient Tamil poetry such as the Silappadhikaram, describes women in exquisite drapery or sari. Madisar is a typical style worn by Brahmin women from Tamil Nadu. Women wear colourful silk sarees on special occasions such as marriages. Kanchipuram silk sari is a type of silk sari made in the Kanchipuram region in Tamil Nadu, worn by brides during marriages and as dresses for special occasions by most women in South India. It has been recognized as a Geographical indication by the Government of India in 2005–2006. Kovai Cora Cotton is a type of cotton sari made in the Coimbatore.

The men wear a dhoti, a 4.5 m (15 ft) long, white rectangular piece of non-stitched cloth often with brightly coloured stripes at the border. It is usually wrapped around the waist and the legs and knotted at the waist. A colourful lungi with typical batik patterns is the most common form of male attire in the countryside.

People in urban areas generally wear tailored clothing, and western dress is popular. Western-style school uniforms are worn by both boys and girls in schools, even in rural areas. Calico, a plain-woven textile made from unbleached and often not fully processed cotton, originated at Kozhikode in the 11th century CE, and was known as Chaliyan. The raw fabric was dyed and printed in bright hues, and calico prints later became popular in the Europe.

=== Cuisine ===
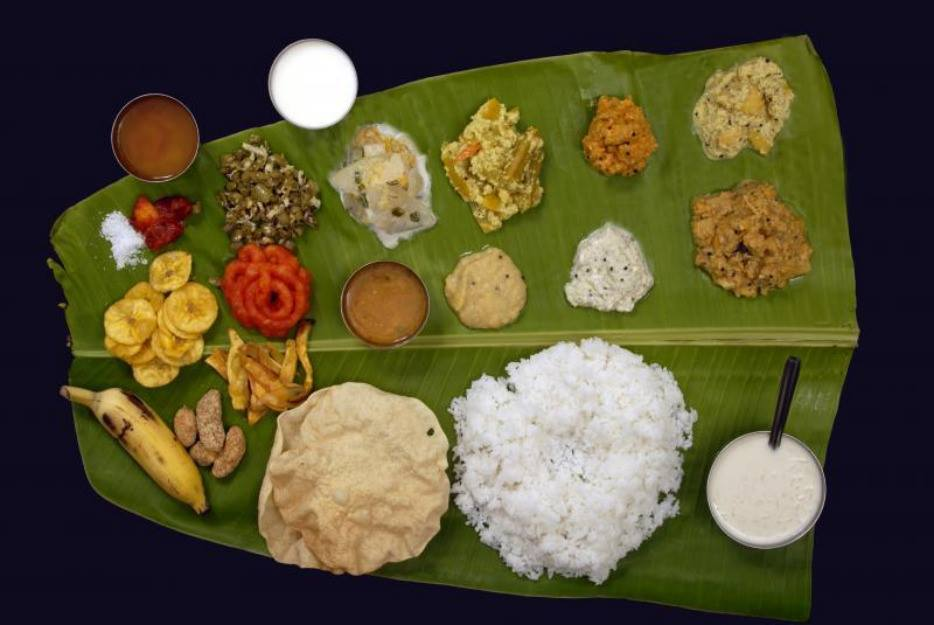
A traditional meal served on a banana leaf

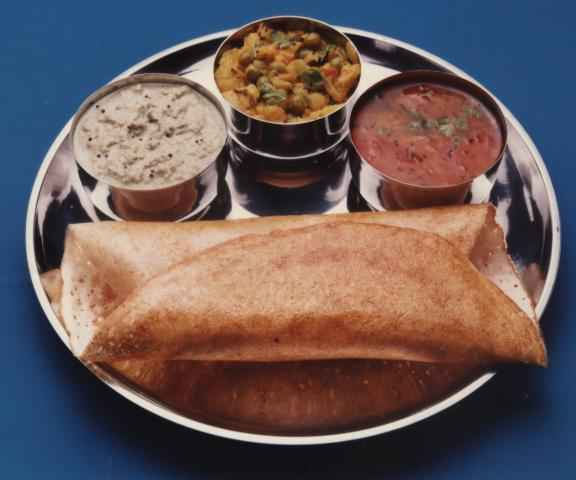
Dosa made from a fermented batter

Rice is the staple food in South Indian meals. Coconut and spices are used extensively in South Indian cuisine. The region has a rich cuisine involving both traditional non-vegetarian and vegetarian dishes comprising rice, legumes, and lentils. Its distinct aroma and flavour is achieved by the blending of flavourings and spices, including curry leaves, mustard seeds, coriander, ginger, garlic, chili, pepper, cinnamon, cloves, green cardamom, cumin, nutmeg, coconut, and rosewater.

The traditional way of eating a meal involves being seated on the floor, having the food served on a banana leaf, and using clean fingers of the right hand to take the food into the mouth. After the meal, the fingers are washed; the easily degradable banana leaf is discarded or becomes fodder for cattle. Eating on banana leaves is a custom thousands of years old, imparts a unique flavor to the food, and is considered healthy.

Idli, dosa, uthappam, pesarattu, appam, pongal, and paniyaram are popular breakfast dishes. Rice is generally served with sambar, and rasam for lunch. Tamil cuisine includes a typical virundhu for lunch with poriyal, kootu, and kuzhambu. Particular dishes include sevai, paniyaram, parotta, and opputtu. Kerala cuisine includes dishes like appam, idiyappam, puttu, and pathiri and a full-course vegetarian meal is known as sadya. Andhra cuisine is characterized by pickles and spicy curries with popular dishes including ulava charu, bobbatlu, pootharekulu, and gongura. Chettinad cuisine is famous for its non-vegetarian items, and Hyderabadi cuisine is popular for its biryani. Udupi cuisine, which originates from Udupi located in the Canara region of Karnataka is famous for its vegetarian dishes and neer dosa, ragi mudde, Maddur vada, obbattu, bisi bele bath, and Dharwad pedha are some of the popular cuisines of Karnataka. Fish and sea food form an integral component of the diet along the coast.

=== Music and dance ===
South Indian dance forms

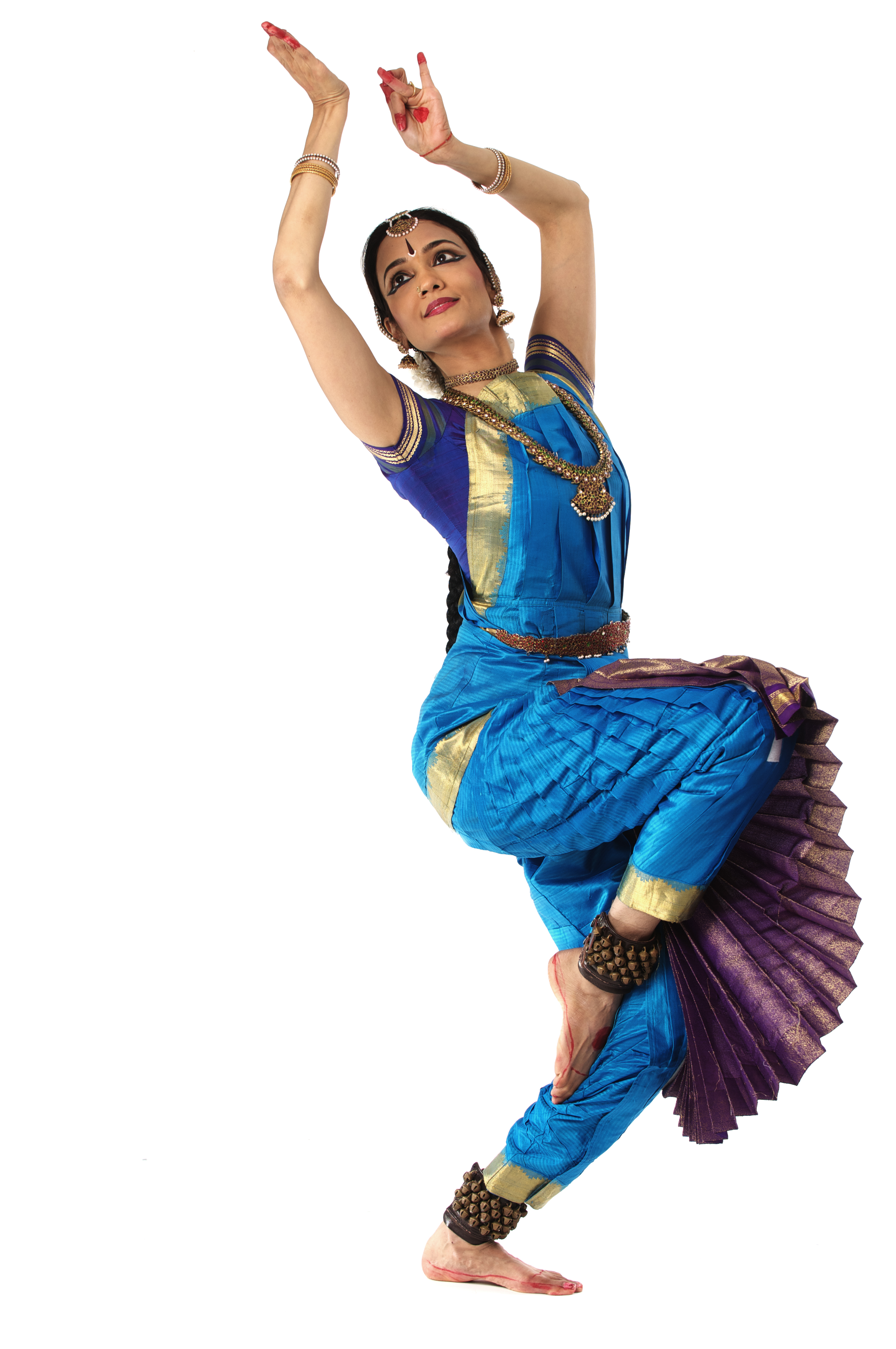
Bharatanatyam (Tamil Nadu)

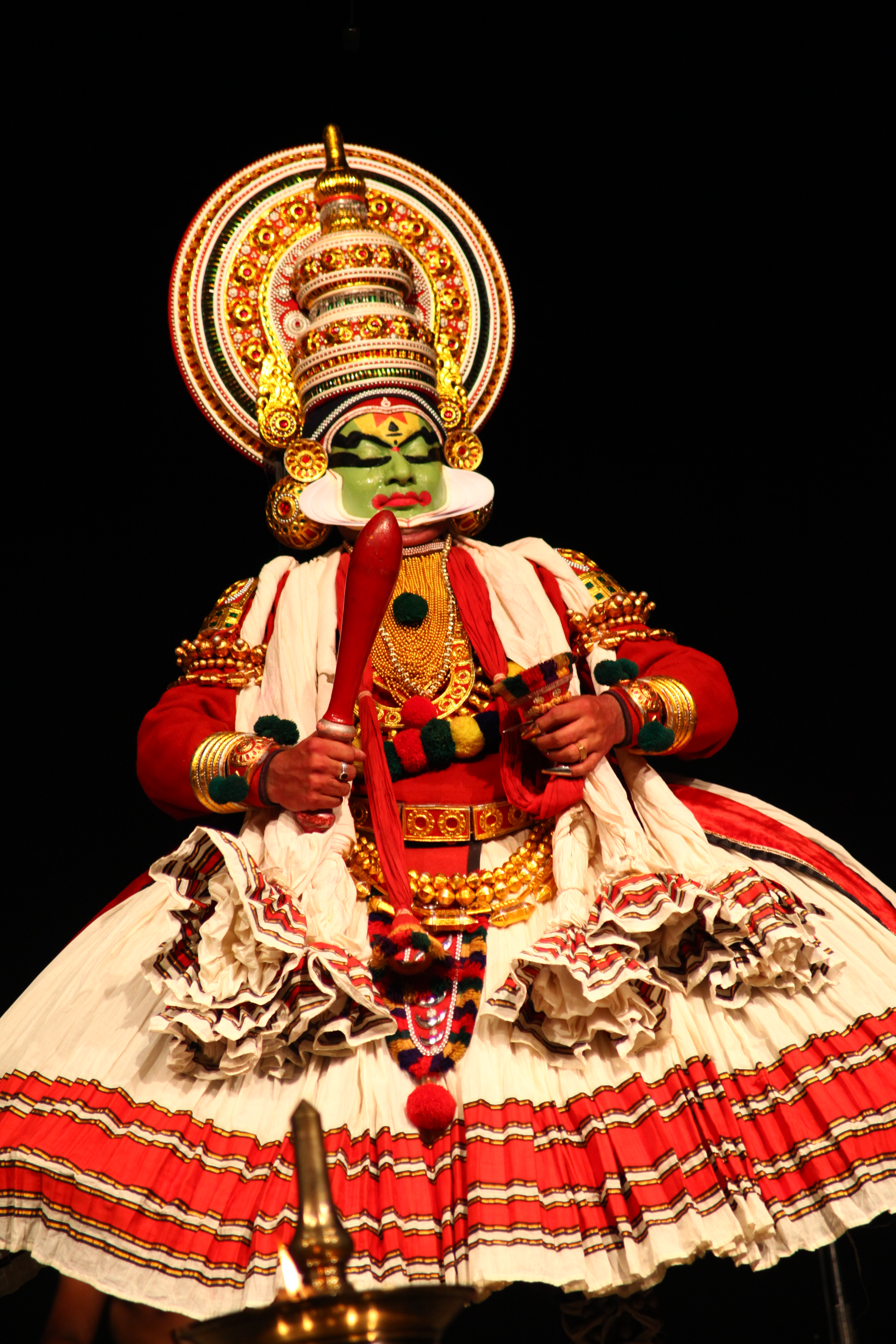
Kathakali (Kerala)

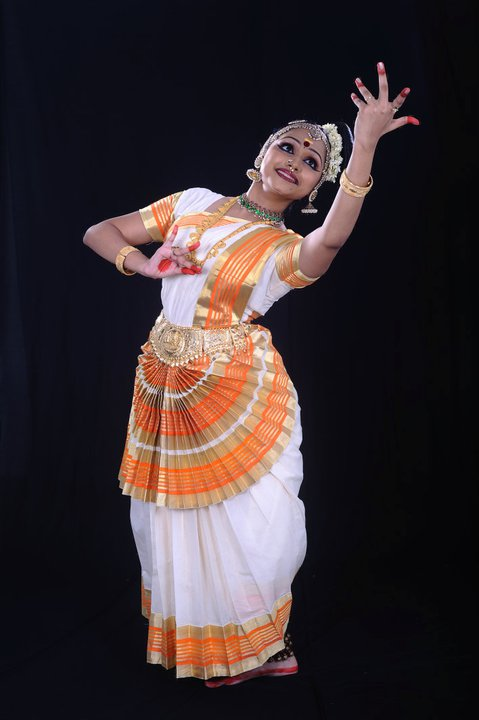
Mohiniyattam (Kerala)

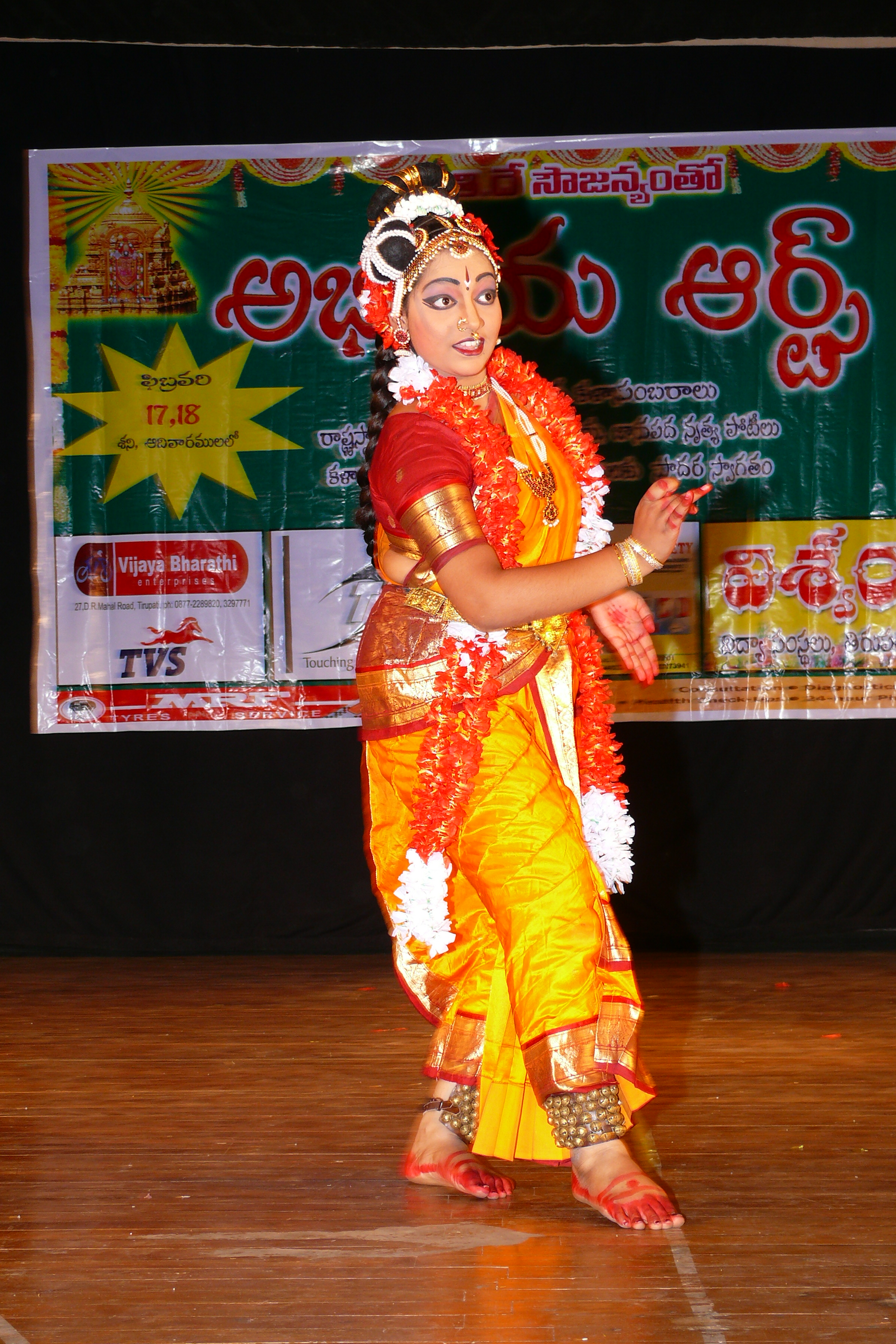
Kuchipudi (Andhra Pradesh)

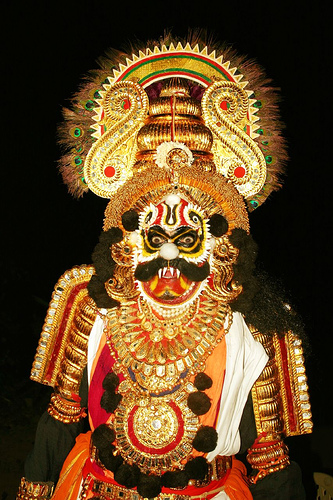
Yakshagana (Karnataka)

The traditional music of South India is known as Carnatic music, which includes rhythmic and structured music by composers such as Purandara Dasa, Kanaka Dasa, Tyagayya, Annamacharya, Baktha Ramadasu, Muthuswami Dikshitar, Shyama Shastri, Kshetrayya, Mysore Vasudevachar, and Swathi Thirunal. Nadaswaram, a reed instrument that is often accompanied by the thavil, a type of drum instrument are the major musical instruments used in temples and weddings.

South India is home to several distinct dance forms with major being Bharatanatyam, Kuchipudi, Kathakali, Mohiniaattam and Yakshagana. Other regional folk dances include Andhra Natyam, Karakattam, Kavadi, Kerala Natanam, Koodiyattam, Margamkali, Oppana, Ottamthullal, Oyilattam, Puravaiattam and Theyyam. The dance, clothing, and sculptures of South India exemplify the beauty of the body and motherhood.

=== Literature ===
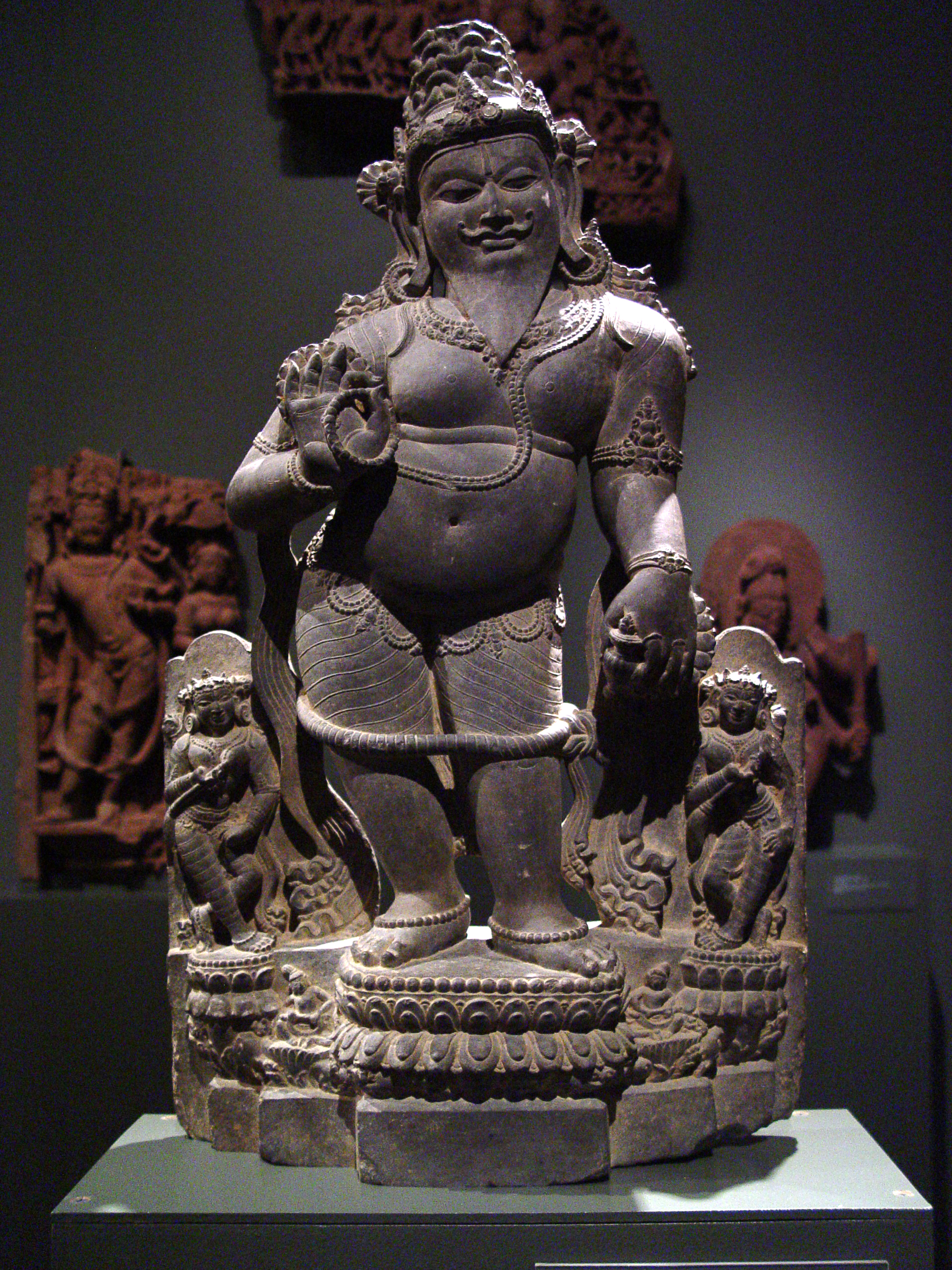
Sage Agastya of the First Tamil Sangam

South India has an independent literary tradition dating back to over 2500 years. The earliest known literature of South India is the poetic Sangam literature, which was written in Tamil and is dated back to the Sangam period (300 BCE to 300 CE). Tamil literature from the period was composed in three successive poetic assemblies known as Tamil Sangams, the earliest of which, according to ancient tradition, were held on a now vanished continent far to the south of India. Early Tamil literature include the oldest grammatical treatise, Tholkappiyam, and the epics Silappatikaram and Manimekalai.

References to Kannada literature appear from the fourth century CE. Telugu literature adopted a form of Prakrit which in course of development became the ancestor of Telugu. Distinct Malayalam literature came later in the 13th century.

=== Architecture ===
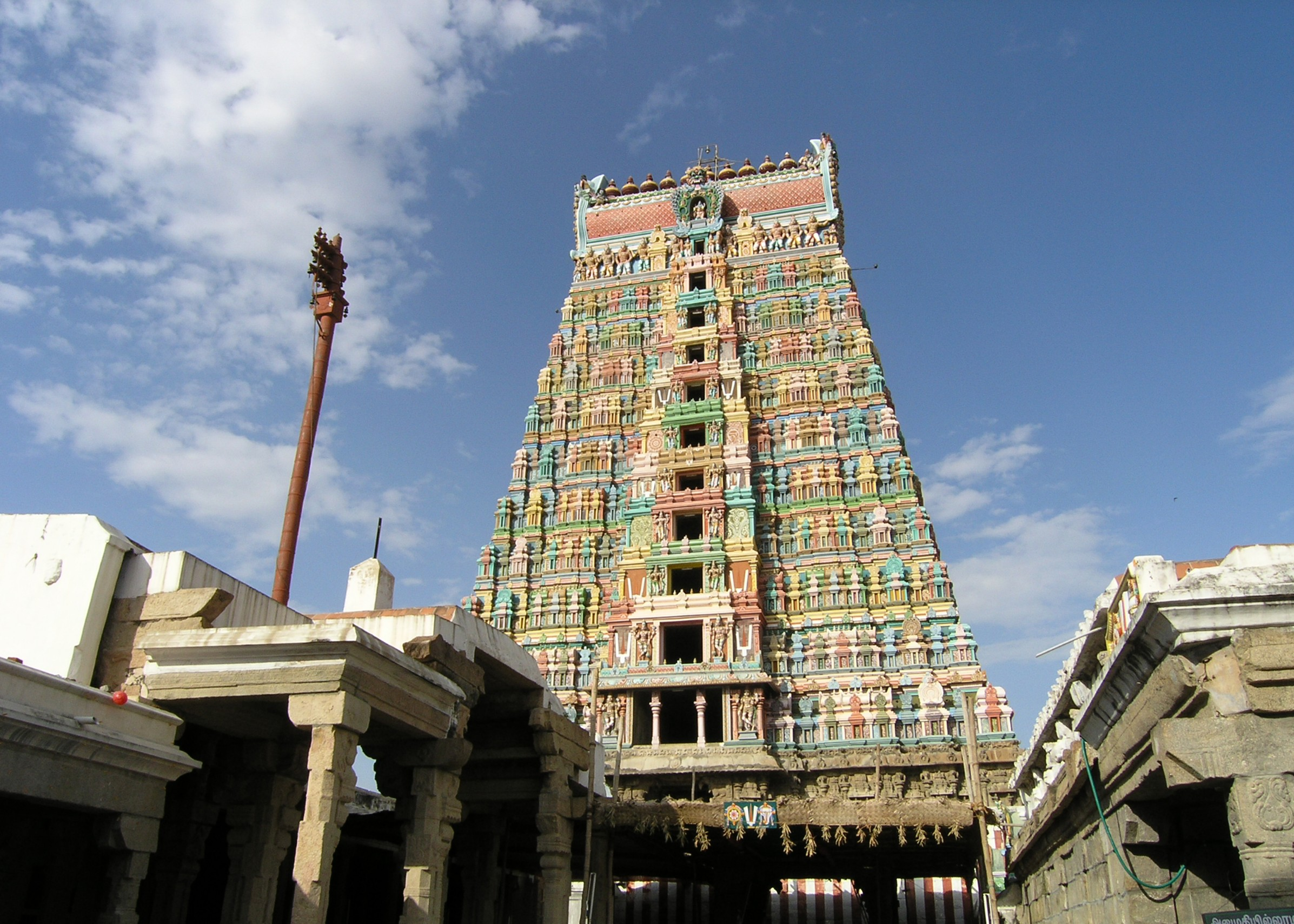
The large gopuram is a hallmark of Dravidian architecture

South India has two distinct styles of rock architecture, the Dravidian style of Tamil Nadu, Andhra Pradesh and the Vesara style of Karnataka, Telangana. The architecture of Kerala is unique and emerged from the Dravidian architecture.

In Dravidian architecture, the temples considered of porches or mandapas preceding the door leading to the garbagriha (sanctum). Large gopurams (gate-pyramids) located atop the entrances to large quadrangular enclosures that surround the main sanctum and large pillared halls are usual features of these temples. Besides these, a South Indian temple usually has a tank called the kalyani or pushkarni. The gopuram is a monumental tower, usually ornate at the entrance of the temple forms a prominent feature of koils and Hindu temples of the Dravidian style. They are topped by the kalasam, a bulbous stone finial and function as gateways through the walls that surround the temple complex. The gopuram's origins can be traced back to the Pallavas who built the group of monuments in Mahabalipuram and Kanchipuram. The Cholas later expanded the same, and by the Pandya rule in twelfth century, these gateways became a dominant feature of a temple's outer appearance. Vimanam are similar structures built over the garbhagriha or inner sanctum of the temple. In the Dravidian architecture, these are usually smaller than the gopurams with a few exceptions such as the Brihadisvara Temple in Thanjavur.

The Vesara style of architecture originated during the reign of Chalukyas and later adopted by Western Chalukyas, and Hoysalas. The later Vijayanagara architecture incorporated the features of both Dravidian and Vesara styles. The temples at Mahabalipuram, Thanjavur, Gangaikonda Cholapuram and Darasuram, Hampi, and Pattadakal are declared UNESCO World Heritage sites.

=== Visual arts ===
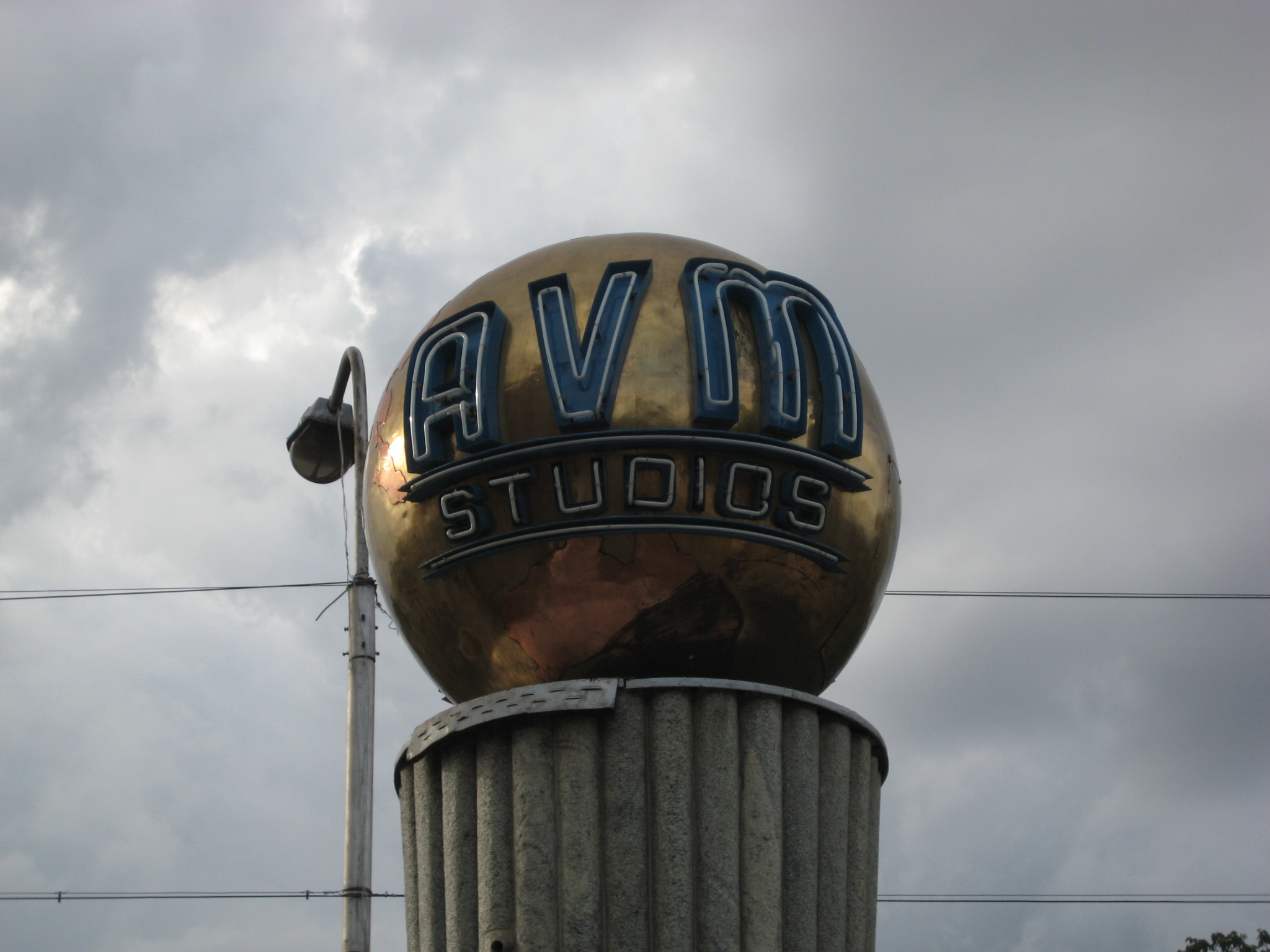
AVM studios in Chennai, the oldest surviving studio in India

Films done in regional languages are prevalent in South India, with several regional cinemas being recognized: Kannada cinema (Karnataka), Malayalam cinema (Kerala), Tamil cinema (Tamil Nadu), and Telugu cinema (Andhra Pradesh and Telangana). The first silent film in South India, Keechaka Vadham, was made by R. Nataraja Mudaliar in 1916. Mudaliar also established Madras's first film studio. The first Tamil talkie, Kalidas, was released on 31 October 1931, barely seven months after India's first talking picture, Alam Ara.

Swamikannu Vincent built the first cinema studio of South India, at Coimbatore, introducing the "tent cinema", which he first established in Madras and which was known as "Edison's Grand Cinemamegaphone". Filmmakers K. N. T. Sastry and B. Narsing Rao in Telugu cinema; K Balachandar, Balu Mahendra, Bharathiraaja, and Mani Ratnam in Tamil cinema; Adoor Gopalakrishnan, Shaji N. Karun, John Abraham, and G. Aravindan in Malayalam cinema; and Girish Kasaravalli, Girish Karnad and P. Sheshadri in Kannada cinema produced realistic cinema in parallel with each other throughout the 1970s.

South Indian cinema has also had an influence on politics of Tamil Nadu. Prominent film personalities such as C N Annadurai, M G Ramachandran, M Karunanidhi, N. T. Rama Rao, and Jayalalithaa have become chief ministers of South Indian states. As of 2014, South Indian film industries contribute to 53% of the total films produced in India.

Feature films certified by CBFC (2019)
Language	No. of films
Telugu	281
Tamil	254
Malayalam	219
Kannada	336
Tulu	16
Konkani	10
Total	1,116

== Utility services ==
=== Health ===
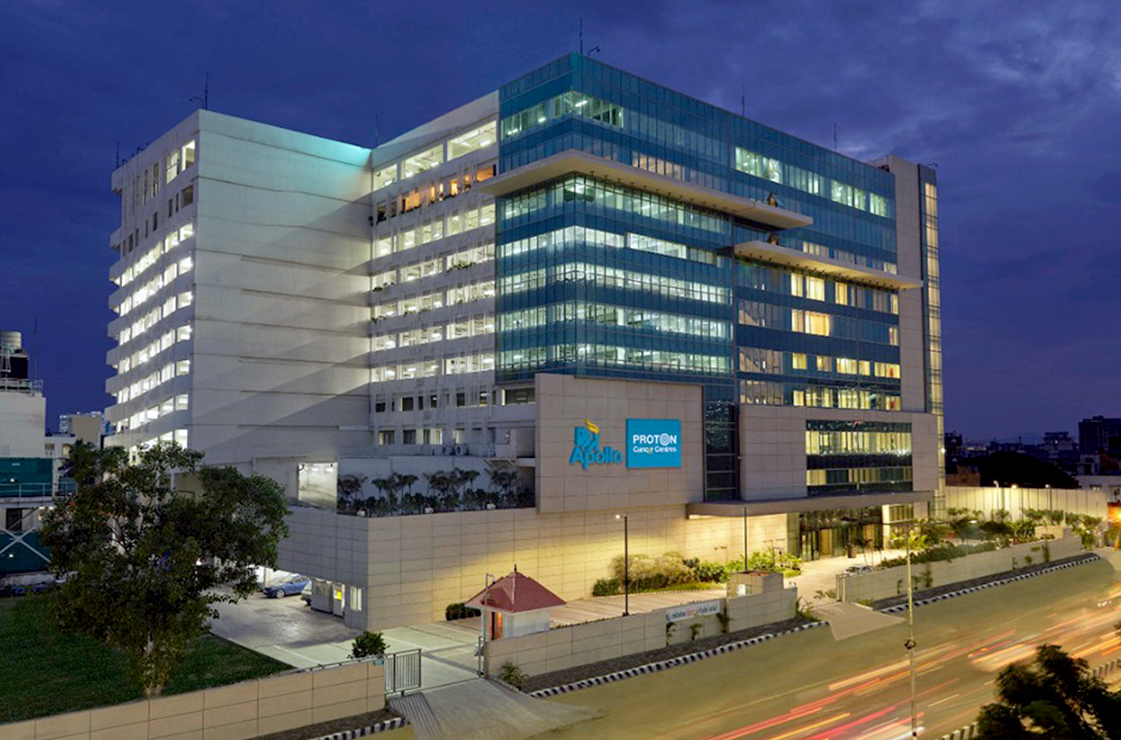
Chennai, India's 'healthcare capital'

All South Indian states rank in the top ten in institutional delivery in India and life expectancy. The region also has a lower infant and child mortality compared to the national average. Chennai attracts about 45 percent of health tourists coming to India and is known as India's health capital. As of 2017, there are 9,482 public health facilities run by the respective state governments. Apart from these, there are 676 AYUSH facilities, 11 defence hospitals, 32 hospitals run by Indian Railways, and 39 hospitals run by state insurance corporations.

Public health facilities run by state/UT governments (2017)
State	Primary Centers	Community Centers	Sub-divisional Hospitals	District Hospitals	Total facilities	Beds
Andhra Pradesh	1,417	198	31	20	1,666	60,799
Karnataka	2,547	207	147	42	2,943	56,333
Kerala	933	229	82	53	1,297	39,511
Lakshadweep	4	3	2	1	10	250
Puducherry	40	4	5	4	53	4,462
Tamil Nadu	1,854	385	310	32	2,581	72,616
Telangana	788	82	47	15	932	17,358
Total	7,583	1,108	624	167	9,482	251,509

Government Hospitals (2017)
State	Rural		Urban	
State	Hospitals	Beds	Hospitals	Beds
Andhra Pradesh	193	6,480	65	16,658
Karnataka	2,471	21,072	374	49,093
Kerala	981	16,865	299	21,139
Lakshadweep	9	300	0	0
Puducherry	3	96	11	3,473
Tamil Nadu	692	40,179	525	37,353
Telangana	802	7,668	61	13,315
Total	5,151	92,780	1,335	141,031

== Education ==
As per the 2011 census, the average literacy rate in South India is approximately 80%, considerably higher than the Indian national average of 74%, with Kerala having the highest literacy rate of 93.91%.

Major Educational Institutions

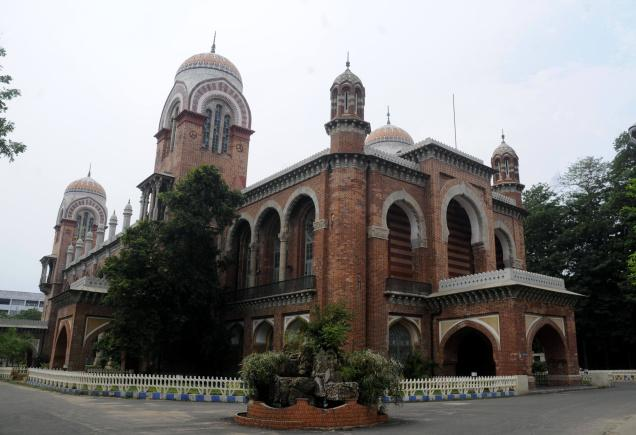
University of Madras, one of the oldest and premier university

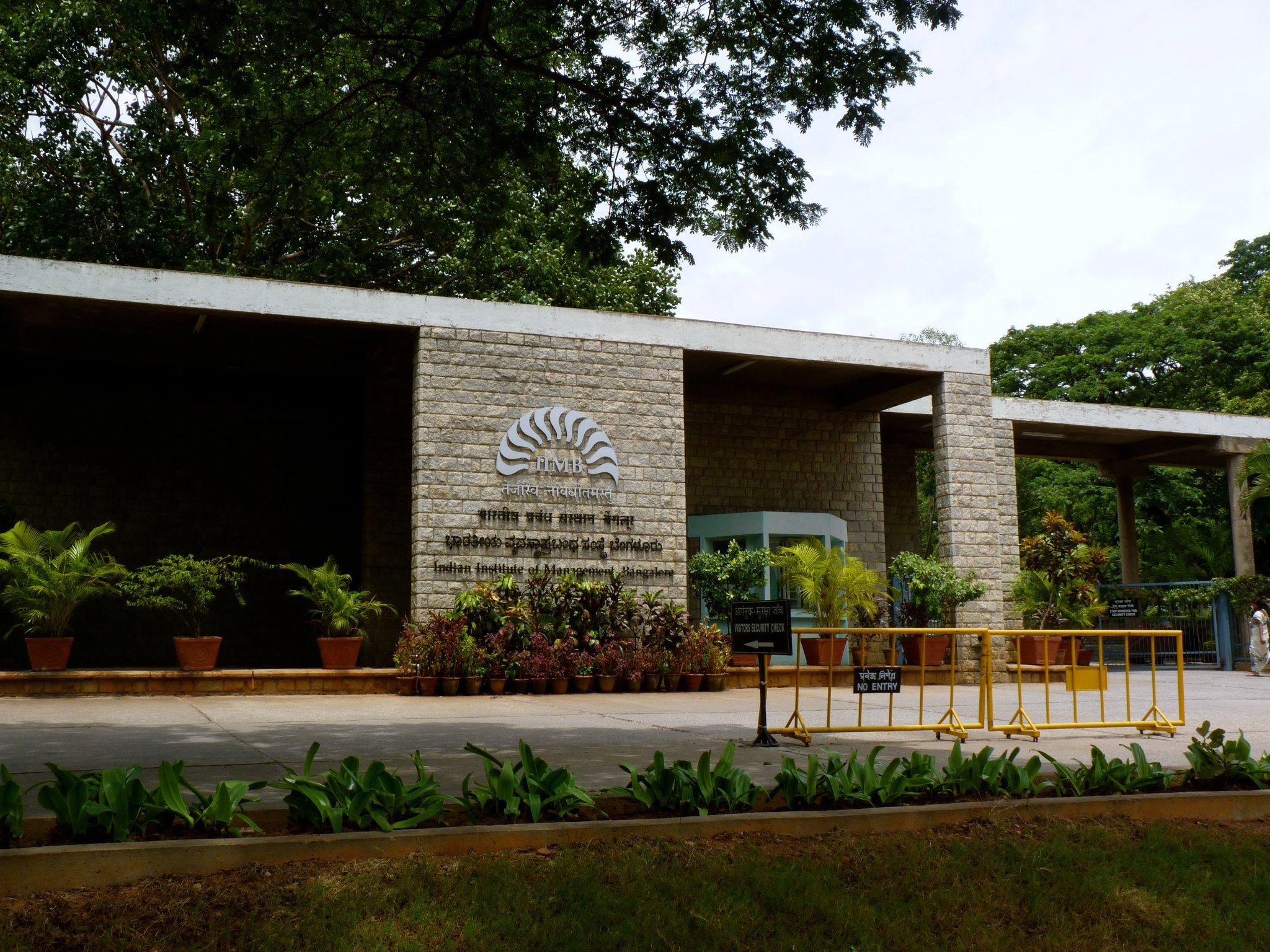
IIM Bangalore, one of the top ranked management institutes

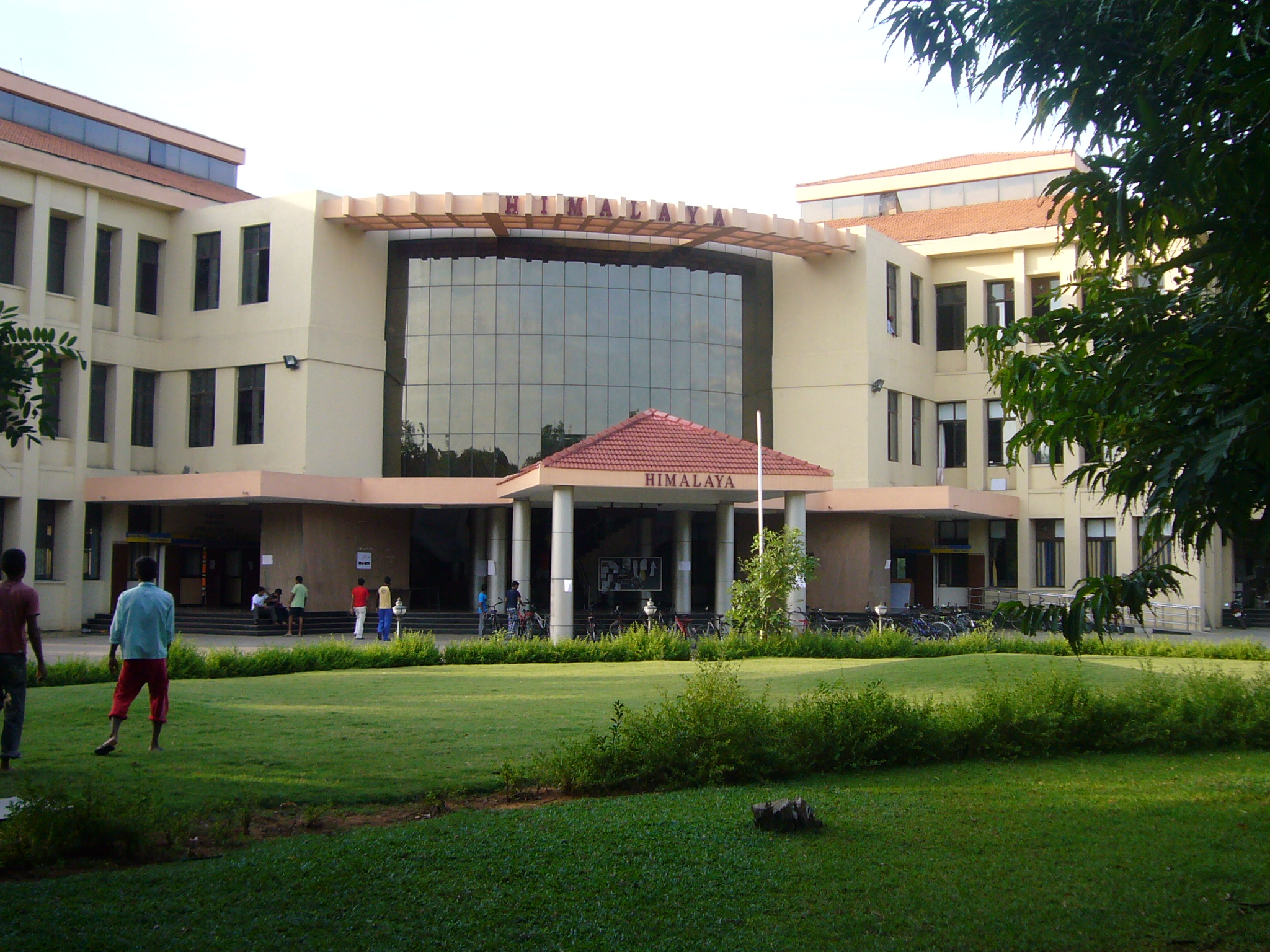
IIT Madras, one of the oldest and prominent IITs

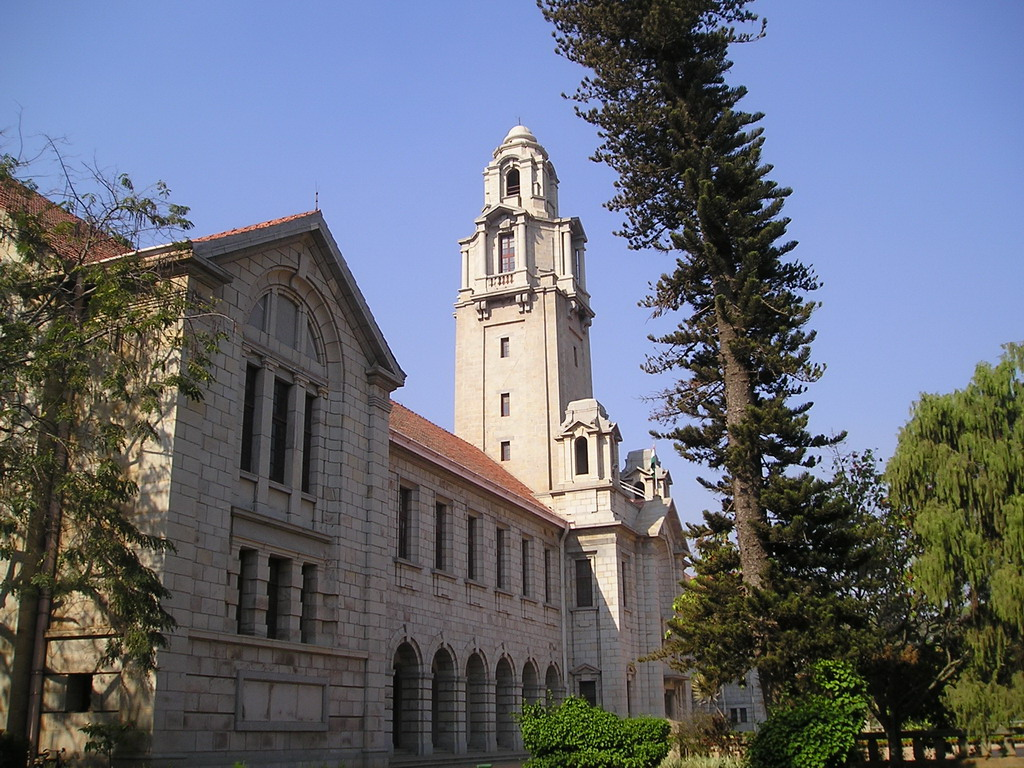
IISc Bangalore, one of the premium research institutes

The table below is correct as of 26 November 2022.

State	Central universities	State universities	Deemed universities	Private universities	Total
Andhra Pradesh (list)	3	27	4	6	40
Karnataka (list)	1	34	14	25	74
Kerala (list)	1	15	3	0	19
Puducherry (list)	1	1	1	0	3
Tamil Nadu (list)	2	22	28	4	56
Telangana (list)	3	17	4	5	29
Total	11	116	54	40	221

South India is home to some of the nation's prominent institutions of higher education.

Institutes of National Importance
Name	Abbreviation	Type	Locations
Indian Institutes of Technology	IIT	Engineering and Technology	Chennai, Hyderabad, Palakkad, Tirupati, Dharwad
Indian Institutes of Management	IIM	Management	Bangalore, Kozhikode, Tiruchirappalli, Visakhapatnam
National Institutes of Technology	NIT	Engineering and Technology	Kozhikode, Surathkal, Warangal, Tiruchirappalli, Puducherry, Tadepalligudem
Indian Institutes of Information Technology	IIIT	Engineering and Technology	Kancheepuram, Sri City, Tiruchirappalli, Dharwad, Kurnool, Kottayam, Raichur
National Institute of Food Technology	NIFTEM	Food technology	Thanjavur
All India Institutes of Medical Sciences	AIIMS	Medicine	Bibinagar, Madurai, Mangalagiri
Indian Institute of Science	IISc	Science	Bangalore
Indian Institutes of Science Education and Research	IISER	Science	Thiruvananthapuram, Tirupati
National Institute of Design	NID	Architecture	Amravati
National Institute of Pharmaceutical Education	NIPER	Medicine	Hyderabad
School of Planning and Architecture	SPA	Architecture	Vijayawada
Medical Research Institutes	MRI	Medicine	JIPMER-Puducherry, NIMHANS-Bangalore, SCTIMST-Thiruvananthapuram
Dakshina Bharat Hindi Prachar Sabha	DBHPS	Language Studies	Chennai
Kalakshetra Foundation	KF	Arts and Culture	Chennai
Rajiv Gandhi National Institute of Youth Development	RGNIYD	Youth Development	Chennai
Indian Institute of Petroleum and Energy	IIPE	Engineering and Technology	Visakhapatnam

== Sports ==
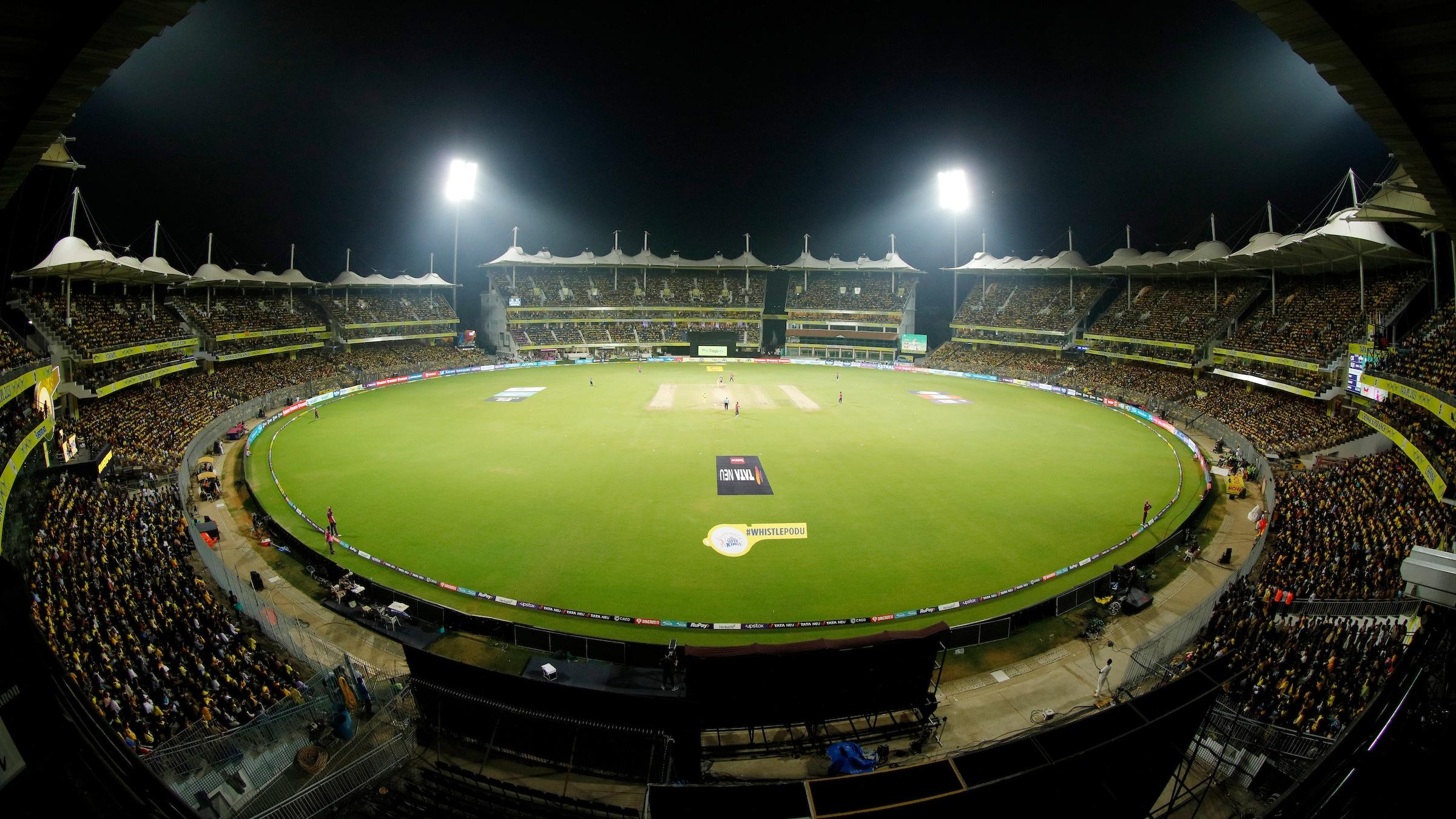
M. A. Chidambaram Stadium in Chennai, one of the oldest cricketing venues

Cricket is the most popular sport in South India. The region has five current international cricket venues: M. A. Chidambaram Stadium in Chennai, M. Chinnaswamy Stadium in Bangalore, Dr. Y. S. Rajasekhara Reddy International Cricket Stadium in Vishakapatnam, Rajiv Gandhi International Cricket Stadium in Hyderabad and Greenfield International Stadium in Thiruvananthapuram. Six more defunct venues have also hosted international matches in the past. Tennis ball cricket is played throughout the region. Indian Premier League (IPL) is the premium T20 cricket competition which has three teams from the region namely Chennai Super Kings, Royal Challengers Bangalore and Sunrisers Hyderabad. Chennai Super Kings is the most successful franchise in IPL.

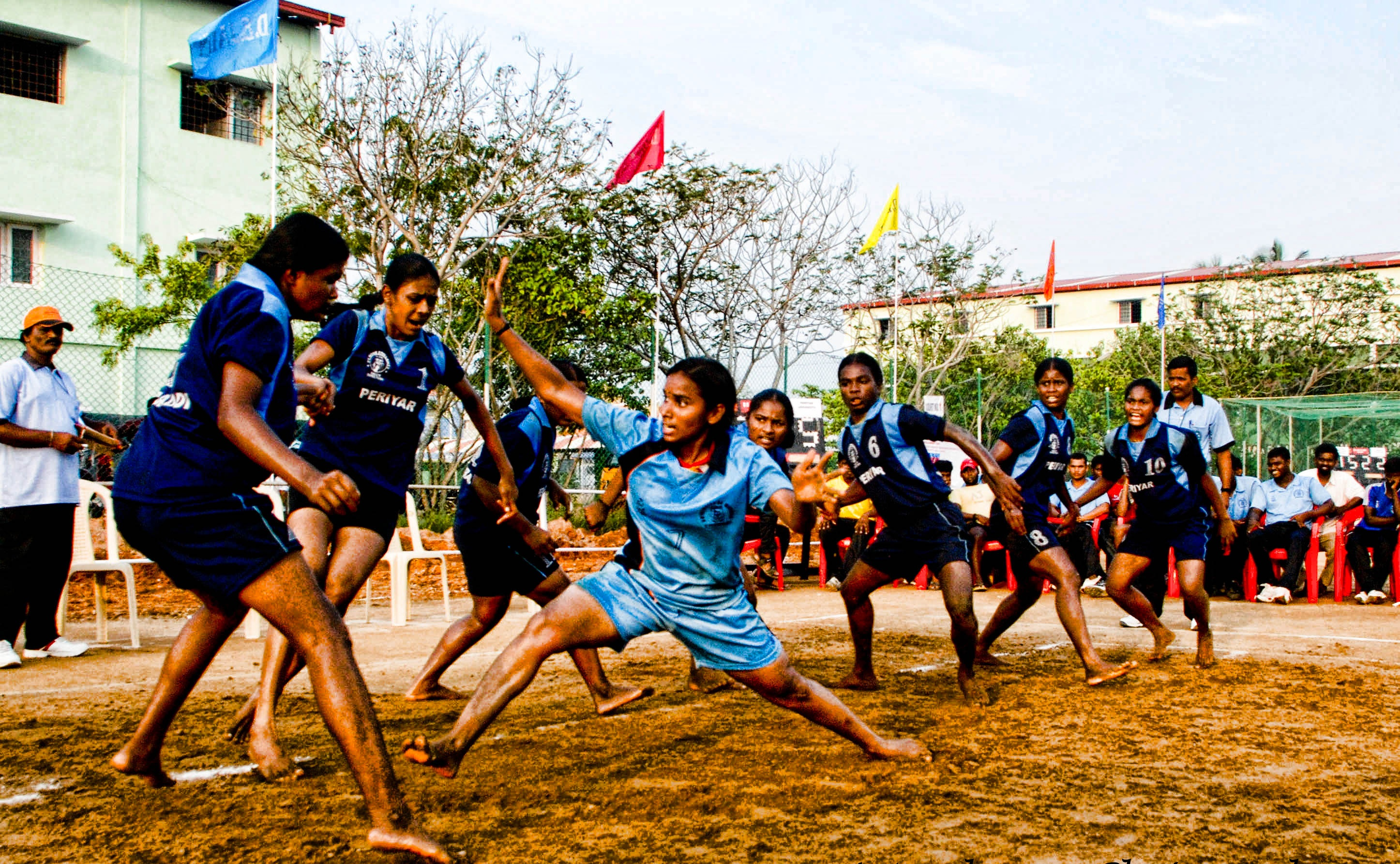
Kabaddi is the state game of all the states in the region

Football is also popular with the Indian Super League being the major club competition. There are three teams from the region:Bengaluru FC, Chennaiyin FC, and Kerala Blasters FC. The Southern Derby or Southern Rivalry, is the name given to a derby contested by any two of the three professional football clubs Bengaluru, Chennaiyin and Kerala Blasters. Santosh Trophy is a football competition amongst states organized by the Indian Football Association. As of 2022, South Indian teams have won 17 championships.

Kabaddi is a contact sport which is the state game of all the states in South India, and played across the region. Pro Kabaddi League is the most popular region based franchise tournament and has three teams representing the region–Bengaluru Bulls, Tamil Thalaivas and Telugu Titans.

Chess is a popular board game which originated as Sathurangam in the seventh century CE. Traditional games like Pallanguzhi, Uriyadi, Gillidanda, Dhaayam are played across the region. Jallikattu, Rekla and Kambala are traditional sporting events involving bulls. Traditional martial arts include Silambattam, Gatta gusthi, Adimurai and Kalari. Vallam kali is a boat race organized in Kerala during the monsoon season.

== See also ==
- Administrative divisions of India
- Southern South Asia
