= Tamil Hindus =

Members of the Tamil ethnolinguistic group who adhere to Hinduism

Tamil Hindus தமிழ் இந்துக்கள் Tamiḻ intukkaḷ
- Tamil Aum symbol.

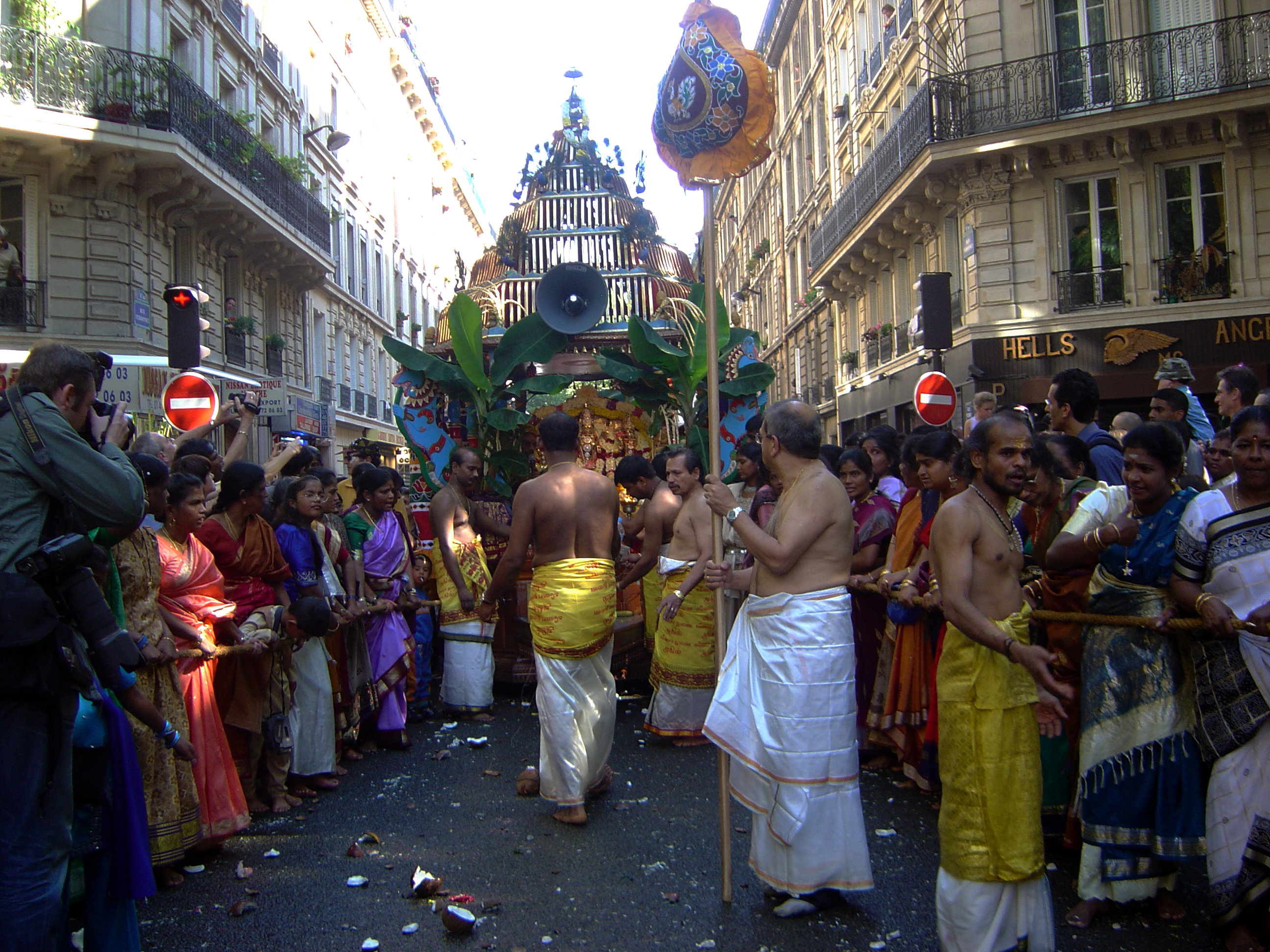
- Celebrations of Murugan by French Tamils in Paris.

Religions
- Hinduism; Shaivism, Vaishnavism, Shaktism, Kaumaram, Ayyavazhi.

Languages
- Majority; Tamil; Sacred; Old Tamil and Sanskrit

Tamil Hindus (Tamil: தமிழ் இந்துக்கள்) are the Tamil-speaking people who follow Hinduism.

Hinduism was the first religion to reach the ancient Tamil kingdoms. Tamil Nadu is home to one of the largest functioning Hindu temples in the world. Tamil influence was one of the contributing factors in survival of Hinduism in Sri Lanka and its spreading in South East Asia. Before the Vedic period, many of them followed the ancient Dravidian folk religion. The Hinduism practiced by Tamils today is a fusion of Vedic and Dravidian traditions. There are notable populations of Tamil Hindus in Sri Lanka and in Indian states of Tamil Nadu, with small populations in Kerala and Karnataka. Though they are present in many countries as diaspora. During the Sri Lankan Civil War, many Tamils emigrated and Hindu temples were built abroad by the Sri Lankan Tamil diaspora to maintain their religion, tradition and culture.

== Religion ==
Perumal (Tamil: பெருமாள், romanized: Perumāl) or Tirumal (Tamil: திருமால், romanized: Tirumāl) is a Hindu deity and considered the most worshiped god in the Sangam literature. Perumal is worshipped mainly among Tamil Hindus of South India and its diaspora, who consider Perumal to be a form of Vishnu. The Ranganathaswamy Temple, Srirangam one of the temples dedicated to Perumal and is often listed as one of the largest functioning Hindu temple in the world. The temple is an active Hindu house of worship and follows the Tenkalai tradition of Sri Vaishnavism of Hindus. There are many more temples for Maha Vishnu located in Tamil Nadu. Most of the 108 Divya Desams and 108 Abhimana Kshethrams of Lord Vishnu. Murugan is also one of the important gods and is considered by many to be the patron god of the Tamil language and Tamil people. There are a lot of temples dedicated to Murugan in Tamil Nadu and Sri Lanka. The Six Abodes of Murugan in Tamil Nadu are considered to be the most sacred abodes of Murugan and was mentioned in ancient Sangam literature. Most of the Tamil Hindus are followers of the Shaiva Siddhanta branch of Shaivism, Vaishnavism, and Shaktism. Many Tamils of rural regions have their village deities, and earlier had been followers of the Dravidian folk religion.

Other Tamil deities includes Ayyanar, Karuppar, Muniyaiya, Mariamman.

== Culture ==
=== Festivals ===
Thaipusam or Thaipoosam is the festival of the Tamil Hindus which falls on the full moon in the Tamil month of Thai. The festival is celebrated by Tamil Hindus in various countries.

=== Cuisine ===
Most of the Tamil cuisine is directly influenced by the Hindu culture, though there is a mixture of both a vegetarian and a non-vegetarian diet. Most of it has its influence of South India. On special occasions, traditional Tamil dishes are served in a traditional manner, using banana leaves in place of utensils. After eating, the banana leaves are then used as a secondary food for cattle. A typical breakfast meal consists of idli or dosa with chutney. Lunch includes rice, sambar, Curd, kuzhambu, and rasam. Though many of them consume non-vegetarian, but not beef due to religious prohibition.

== See also ==
- Tamil Jain
- Tamil Muslim
- List of Tamil people

== Sources ==
- Venkatesan, Archana (2014). "Tamils: Hinduism". Oxford Bibliographies Online. doi:10.1093/OBO/9780195399318-0049.
