= Vazhaithandu =

Banana or plantain stem

- A vegetable curry using vazhaithandu
- Region or state: India
- Associated cuisine: South Indian cuisine
- Main ingredients: Banana or plantain stem

Vazhaithandu refers to banana stem or plantain stem and is used in various soups, stews, curries, stir fries and other dishes (thogayal, pachadi, poriyal and koottus). It is also used to make poriyal (subzi), juiced, used in a version of raita.

It is used as a remedy for kidney stones in Tamil Nadu, India.

The 1968 Tamil film Panama Pasama featured the song "Vazhai Thandu."
