= Cuisine of Pondicherry =

Regional cuisine

The cuisine of the Indian union territory of Pondicherry consists of a mixture of Tamil and French influence, given the history of the area as a former French outpost in India until the late 20th Century. Common foods include baguettes and croissants with coffee for breakfast, ratatouille, coq au vin, bouillabaisse, which all show their French heritage or South Indian meals such as masala dosa, sambar or idli.

== French influence ==
While a French colony, the local cuisine was downplayed. "Leaving aside the food of the Indian class, which does most of the time consist of boiled rice seasoned with a scanty patch of grass or fish, we will provide only some details about the European diet. [...]"

Food in Pondicherry is strongly influenced by the French. Salade niçoise, crêpes (both sweet and savoury) and crème brûlée are among popular French dishes still prepared in Pondicherry. Multiple French restaurants are located in the area, including bakeries, cafés, seafood restaurants and traditional French restaurants. There was also much cross-pollination between Pondicherry and South Asia and Vietnam (both were under French control) as people travelled between these two locations for business, for administration and as part of the armed forces. Tamil food was refined by French influence, using much less spice.

== Indian influence ==
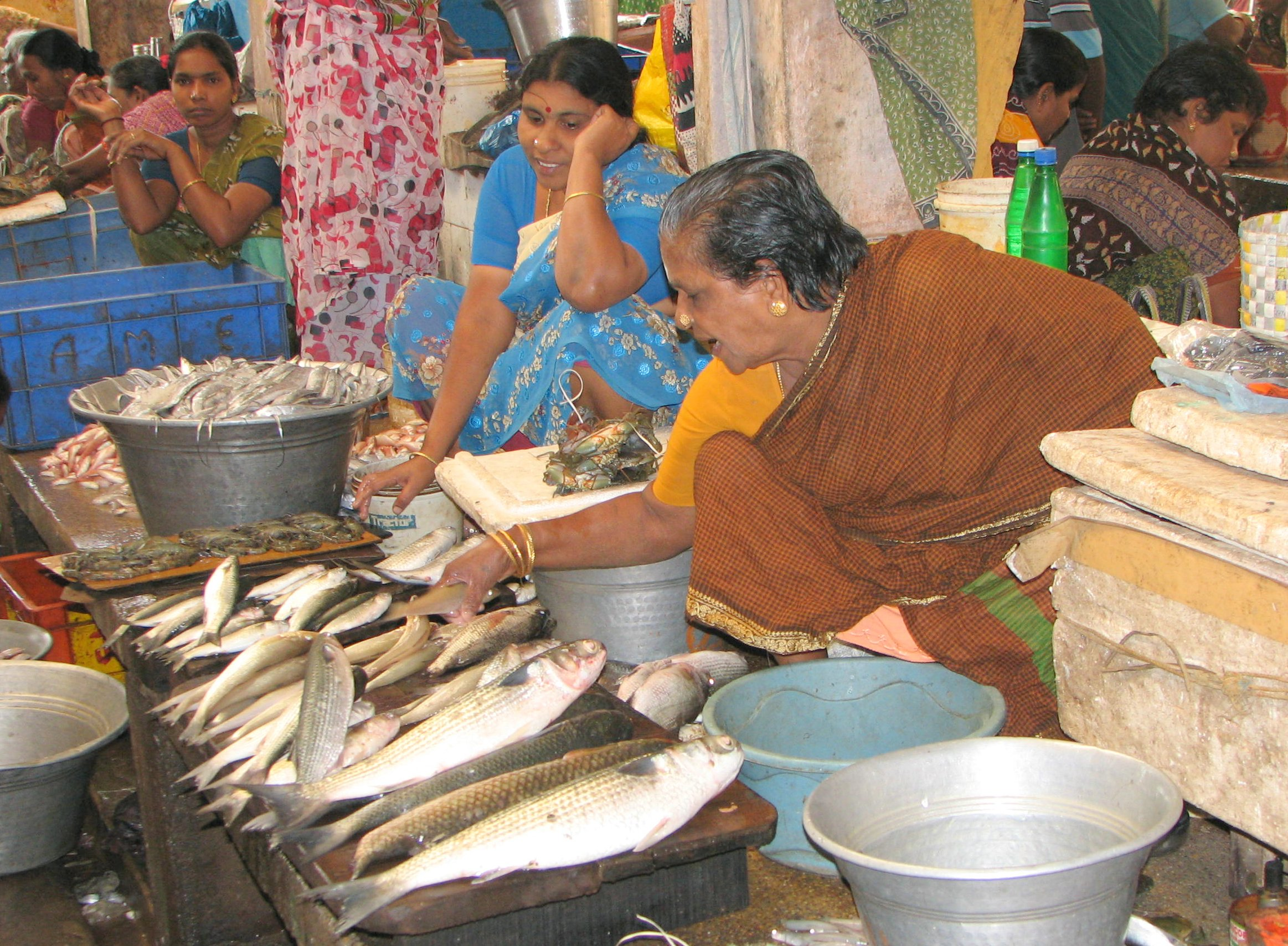
Fish market in Pondicherry; being close to the ocean, fish is abundant.

The cuisine from the neighbouring Indian states of Tamil Nadu, Karnataka, Andhra Pradesh and Kerala have also influenced the cuisine of Pondicherry. Recently growth of North Indian community at Pondicherry brought many North Indian chaat shops to Pondicherry.

== Fusion and Creole cuisine ==
Given the history of the area, local cuisine is a fusion of many cultures. Dosas made like crepes with meat and cheese instead of masala are an example. Chaiyos (a kind of Vietnamese spring roll made from rice flour) also appear in local restaurants. Vindaloo is different than in Goa (a result of the area’s Portuguese past). Prawn malay curry also shows influence from South East Asia. Pondicherrian Fish Assad Curry, a coconut-milk-laden curry, flavoured with anise and curry leaves and finished with a squeeze of lime is a "quintessential" local dish. Bouillabaisse morphed into Meen Puyabaise with turmeric to suit the French palate. With the passage of time, local creole dishes have slowly begun to fade from restaurants in Pondicherry, with some older residents attempting to keep these dishes alive by offering classes in their homes on how to prepare them.
