= Rajagopala Vilasamu =

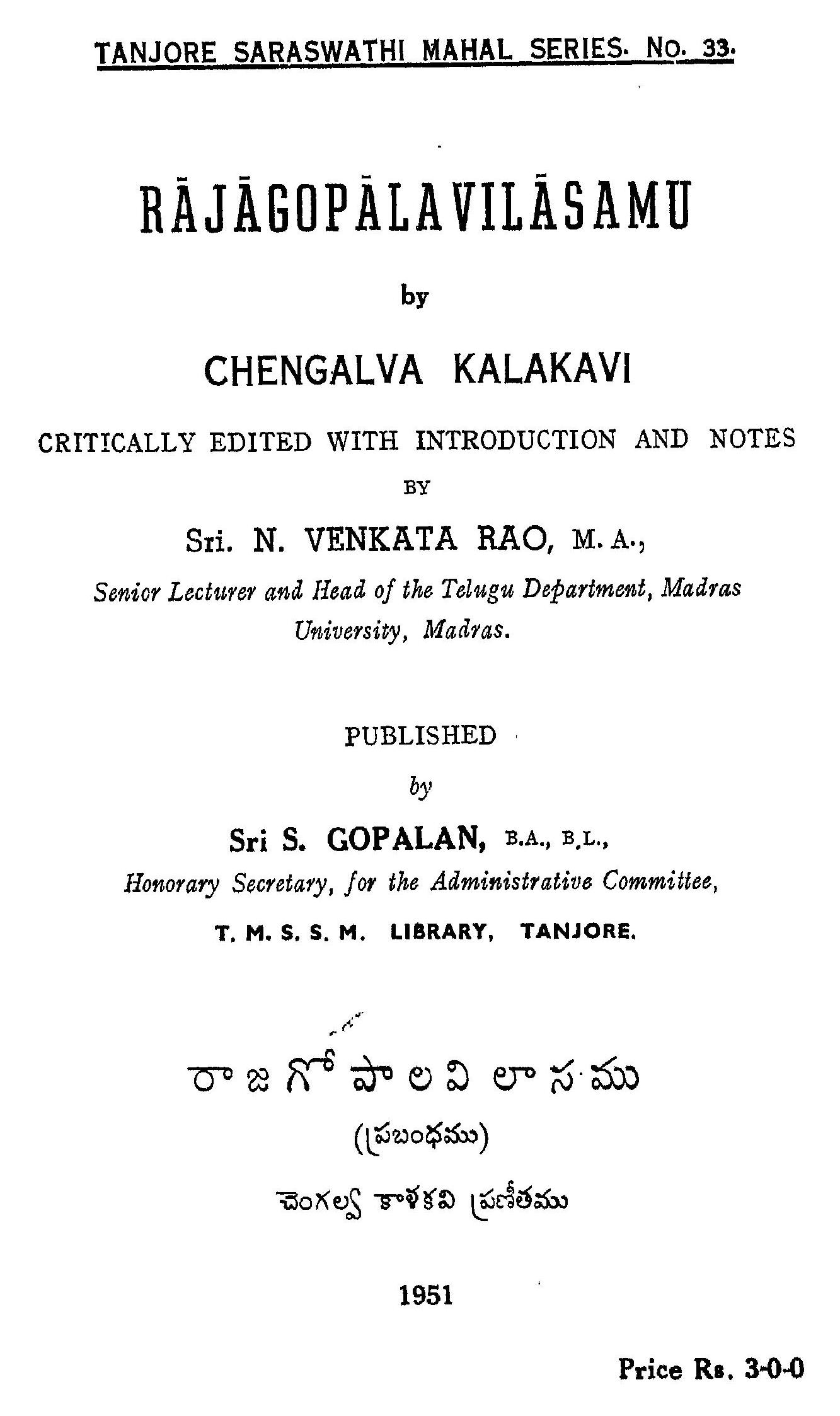
Book cover of Raja-Gopala-Vilasamu.

Rajagopala Vilasamu (Telugu: రాజగోపాలవిలాసము) is a 17th-century Telugu poetic work (kavya) of Chengalva Kalakavi or Kalaya. The work is thus of historical as well as of poetic value. The author Kalaya is a court poet of Vijaya Raghava Nayak of Tanjore.

The work describes the sports of Sri Rajagopalaswami (Sri Krishna), who was the Patron deity of the Naick Kings of Tanjore. They installed Sri Krishna in Mannargudi (Rajamannarkoil) about twenty-five miles southeast of Tanjore.

The kavya briefly describes the Sthalapurana of Mannargudi, and then describes the sports of Sri Krishna with his eight consorts. The poet has depicted the sports so as to exemplify the eight Nayikas well known in Sringara Kavyas (Ashta Nayika). The introductory part of the work gives the genealogy of Vijaya Raghava Nayak, the patron of the poetic work.

The work was edited with a detailed introduction in Telugu and English by N. Venkata Rao, Head of the Department of Telugu, University of Madras.
