= Pillaiyar Suḻi =

Hindu iconography

Pillaiyar Suḻi is a sacred textual symbol attributed to Hindu god Ganesha

Pillaiyar Suḻi (Tamil: பிள்ளையார் சுழி), also rendered Ganesha's curl or Ganesha's circle, is a sacred textual symbol. It is dedicated to the Hindu deity Pillaiyar (Ganesha), who is ritually worshiped first with prayers for success and is used to symbolize an auspicious beginning. The symbol consists of a circle and a curve similar to the Tamil letter உ(u) with two lines and a dot below. It is used primarily by Tamil Hindus, who usually use it before writing anything new.

== Nomenclature and Symbol ==
Pillayar Suli in Tamil language can be roughly translated to "Ganesha's curl" in English with Pillayar denoting the Hindu god "Ganesha" and Suli meaning "curl". It is also known as "Ganesha's circle". The symbol consists of a circle and a curve similar to the fifth vowel of the Tamil script உ(u) accompanied by two straight horizontal lines and a dot below.

== History and theology ==
The symbol is used to denote the Hindu god Ganesha, who himself was a scribe helping Maharishi Veda Vyasa to write the Hindu epic Mahabharata. As Ganesha is ritually worshiped first with prayers for success, the symbol is written to herald auspiciousness and to remove any obstacles in the path towards success. The origin of the symbol has various explanations.

Pillayar Suli is considered as a truncated version of the Hindu auspicious symbol and mantra Aum. Aum is considered a fusion of five forms, the letters signifying Akhara symbolizing lord Shiva, Ukhara symbolizing Shakti and Makhara representing Malam (taints that adhere to the soul) to go with the fourth and fifth letters in sound form representing Maya (reality and existence) and Ātman (the soul). Ganesha as the son of Shiva and Shakthi is denoted by the Pillayar Suli, which combines the first two forms namely Akhara and Ukhara.

As per the Puranas, Aum symbolizes the Trimurti with Akhara symbolizing the creator god Brahma, Ukhara symbolizing the protector god Vishnu and Makhara symbolizing destroyer god Shiva. Pillayar Suli represents the fusion of Brahma and Vishnu, as a means to create and protect any new creation. According to Kanchi Sankaracharya, there are various meanings of the symbol. The symbol similar to the Tamil letter உ(u) may be derived from Umayaval or Uma, a name of Parvati who is considered as a sister of Vishnu. As Parvati created Ganesha, the symbol became associated with him. He further explains that the curve emanating from a circle indicates that everything arises from the universe (represented by the circle) and the curve may represent Ganesha's trunk. The curve followed by straight lines may also indicate that any work that deviates will be set right on worship to Ganesha.

Tamil saint and Nayanmar Tirumular gives a varied explanation in his Shaiva treatise Tirumantiram. In the fourth section of the tenth Thirumurai, he explains that Agharam denotes the soul and Ugharam denotes the body and the combination them represents life.

The symbol might have had a different realistic usage during the ancient period. Before the advent and widespread usage of paper, palm leaves were used to write manuscripts. The symbol consisting of a circle, a curved line, straight lines and a dot might have been used to test the quality of palm leaves before writing other contents. It later came to be associated with Ganesha.

== Usage ==
The symbol is a sacred textual symbol primarily used by Tamil Hindus. The symbol is used to denote auspiciousness and good luck, it is often used before writing anything new. The symbol is often used in day-to-day activities such as writing a letter, document or a diary. Students often write the symbol before writing exams or tests.

The practice is similar to writing Shri (Tamil:ஸ்ரீ, Sanskrit:श्री) prevalent in North India where the word is used to denote lord Ganesh. Sri Vaishnavas believe that “௳” sign represents the goddess Lakshmi, and it is an alternative for writing Shri.
