= Tamil cuisine =

Culinary traditions of the Tamil people

Tamil cuisine is a generic term used to describe culinary practices among Tamil-speaking populations, originating from Southern India and neighboring Sri Lanka. It encompasses several distinct styles of cuisine or cooking repertoires, which can be divided at a basic level into Tamil cuisine of Southeastern India and Sri Lankan Tamil cuisine. The former is a fundamental part of what is now known as South Indian cuisine, with deep connections to other cooking styles of the southern Deccan. The latter is distinct to the Tamil-speaking populations natives to Ceylon, co-formed with other cooking styles unique to Sri Lanka (Sri Lankan cuisine). It shares significant culinary links with Southwestern India and Southeast Asia.

Meats, along with rice, legumes, and lentils, are popular. Dairy products and tamarind are used to provide sour flavors. On special occasions, traditional Tamil dishes are served in a traditional manner, using banana leaves in place of utensils. After eating, the banana leaves are then used as a secondary food for cattle. A typical breakfast meal consists of idli or dosa with chutney, while lunch includes rice, sambar, curd, kuzhambu, and rasam.

== Typical meals ==
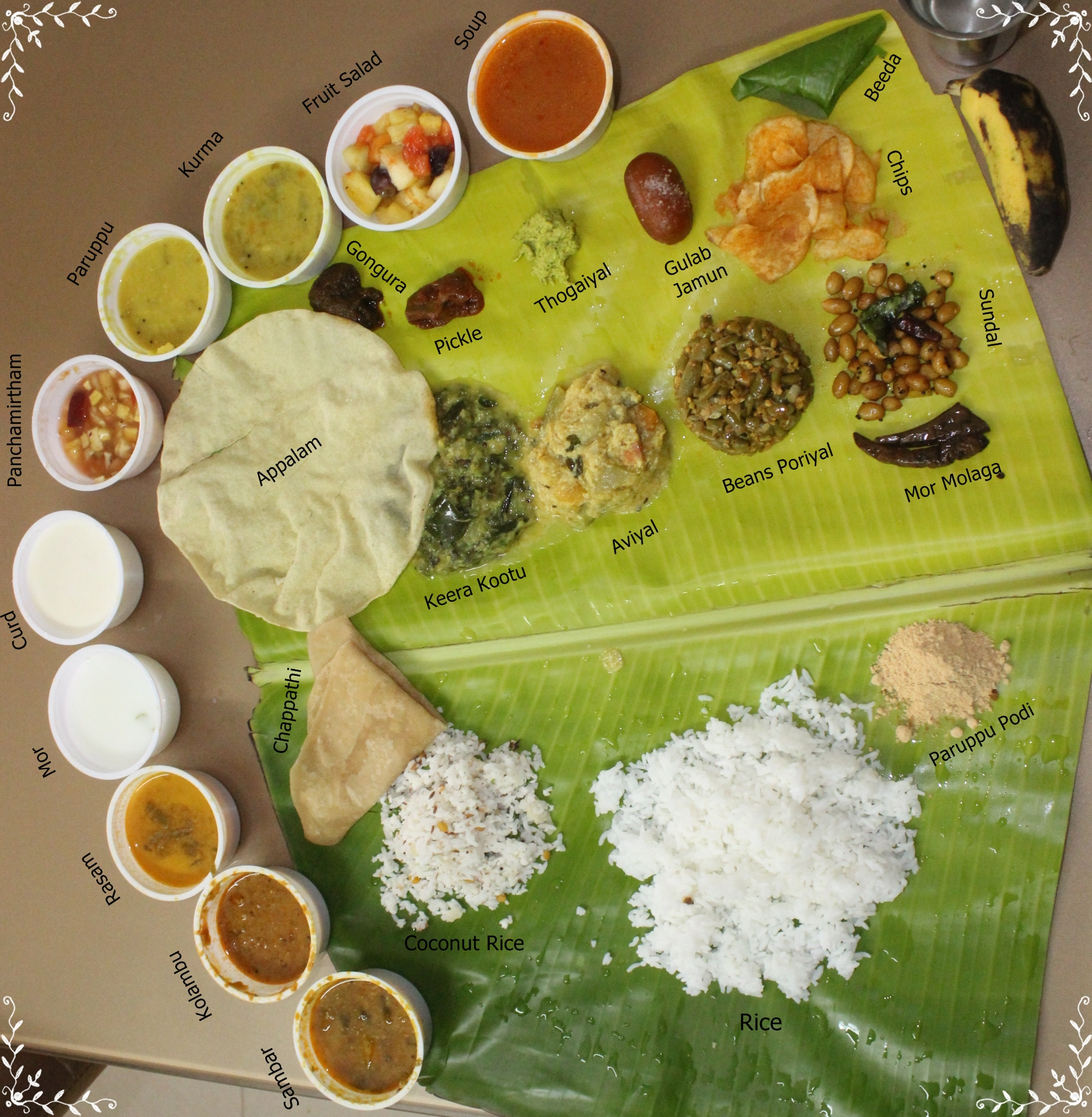
A vegetarian meal in Tamil Nadu

Virundhu (Tamil: விருந்து) refers to the core elements of Tamil cuisine offered to the guests on special occasions, such as festivals and marriage ceremonies. Rice, paruppu, sambar, rasam, kuzhambu, poriyal, and koottu are mixed with buttermilk or curd to prepare pachadi. Dry and fresh fruits or vegetables are also used to prepare traditional cuisine. Meals are typically served with salt, pickles, vada, payasam, and appalam. After the meal, a banana and a betel leaf (paan) with areca nuts and limestone paste are served to promote digestion. Before eating traditional cuisine, people clean a banana leaf which is used as a large sheet for serving food. Rice, poriyal, appalam, and other items are typically served on the leaf.

Coffee and tea are the staple drinks. Payasam, a common dessert, is usually eaten at the end of the meal.

Some examples of main dishes that are typically mixed with rice include:

- Kuzhambu (Tamil: குழம்பு) is any stew that is thick, pourable, or slurry-like in consistency. Sambar comes under the kuzhambu category. Other kuzhambu types are puli, mor kuzhambu (or Karnataka's thambuli(தண்புளி), meaning 'cool or cold sour dish', poondu kuzhambu, milagu kuzhambu, Thakkali Kuzhambu, Kongunadu Selavu Kuzhambu (Selavu, செலவு, means spices like cloves, bay leaves, cinnamon, and black pepper), Chettinad Mandi (Mandi, மண்டி, means 'to sediment'. It uses rice sediment water for thickening in the dish), Kerala Kadalai curry, etc. North Indian gravies like paneer butter Masala, aloo gobhi masala, and peas masala are in this category. It can have meat dishes too.
- Kadaiyal (Tamil: கடையல்) is any green leafy vegetable, like spinach, served with lentils that are cooked, churned and made into a semi-puree-like consistency. Kadai (கடை) means "to churn using kadaikkol (கடைக்கோல்), Maththu (மத்து), or using an electric hand blender". These also have a thick and pourable consistency: Keerai kadaiyal, Pachaipayir kadaiyal, Thattaipayir kadaiyal. Meat dishes are not in this category.
- Othukkam (Tamil: ஒதுக்கம்) is a dish made from moringa leaf stock. "Odhukku" (ஒதுக்கு) literally means "to discard, set-aside, reserve, etc." i.e. a broth or stock. Its consistency is slightly slurry in between the Kuzhambu and Rasam.
- Thuvaiyal (Tamil: துவையல்) is a pounded and mashed paste like chutney made with vegetables, lentils, etc that is of thick or mushy consistency which is then seasoned or tempered. Thuvai (துவை) means "to mash and then temper or season". Only vegetables and lentils are used; it contains no meat. It is also called Thogaiyal (தொகையல்) in which "Thogai" (தொகை) literally means "collection, flock, combine, etc." this giving a rebussed meaning to make a paste. Coconut chutney, Tomato chutney, Pudina chutney, Paruppu Thuvaiyal, Pirandai Thuvaiyal, etc. also come under this category. This is eaten with rice or other dishes like idli, dosai, appam, Idiyappam, Uthaappam, adai, paniyaram, etc. In Hindi they call it Chutney and in Malayalam they call it Chammanthi.
- Saaru (Tamil: சாறு) is a spiced soup that is runny or watery in consistency. It translates to juice. Madras Mulligatawny, which itself is a mispronunciation of மிளகுதண்ணீர் ரசம் (MiLaguthanneer rasam), meaning Blackpepper soup, comes under this category. Meat dishes can be included here.
- Thayir (Tamil: தயிர்) is just simple milk curd and Mor (Tamil: மோர்) is the buttermilk which is made by mixing water and curd with chopped ginger, green chillies, curry leaves and salt.

Types of side dishes that are usually eaten with cooked rice or Idli, dosa, Vadai, Chapathi, Idiyappam, etc):

- Koottu (Tamil: கூட்டு) is any vegetable or green leafy vegetable with Paruppu, like lentils made into a stew with a slightly thick consistency. Koottu, literally means "to combine or add".
- Poriyal (Tamil: பொரியல்) is usually a dry stir-fried vegetable(s) with spices and grated coconut. The word "pori" (பொரி) means "to fry with oil or any fat". Because of the sputtering sound that can be heard while frying something, the word "pori" also started to mean "to sputter". Thus, "puffed rice" is called "pori" and "popcorn" is called "ChoLappori" (சோளப்பொரி).
- Varuval (Tamil: வறுவல்) usually means dry or oil roasted vegetables or any meat or fish with spices. Varu (வறு) means to roast. Also, Vattral (வற்றல்) means dried or dehydrated. Usually, for chips like plantain chips, tapioca chips, etc. it is called Varuthathu (வறுத்தது) because the end product is dry without any moisture.
- Masiyal (Tamil: மசியல்) is boiled and mashed tubers or root vegetables like potatoes, yams, sweet potatoes, tapioca, cassava, etc. that are seasoned with spices. Masi (மசி) means "to mash". Maharashtra's pavbhaji gravy is a Masiyal.
- Pirattal (Tamil: பிரட்டல்) is separately cooked vegetable(s) that are tossed with spices on a pan or wok. Pirattu (பிரட்டு) means 'to toss, to coat or to turn a thing over'.
- Avial (Tamil: அவியல்) are dishes composed ofmixed vegetables and spices that are lightly stir fried and then steamed. Avi (அவி) means to steam.
- Sundal (Tamil: சுண்டல்) is usually dry sautéed boiled legumes or pulses with spices and grated coconut. Sundu (சுண்டு) means to dry up, to boil, etc.
- Thuvattal (Tamil: துவட்டல்) usually means dry pan-fried vegetables. They are fried until they shrink. ThuvaL (துவள்) means "to be flexible", "to bend", or "to shrink".
- Vathakkal (Tamil: வதக்கல்) is usually a dish in which vegetable(s) is sautéed with spices on a pan or wok until they become soft. However, they still retain moisture and have a thick and wet consistency. Vathakku (வதக்கு) means dispirited or fatigued.
- Vanakkal (Tamil: வணக்கல்) is a dish with sautéd vegetable(s) mixed with spices on a pan or wok. It can be either dry like Thuvattal (துவட்டல்) or wet like Vathakkal (வதக்கல்). As a result, it is used as an umbrella term for both of the aforementioned dishes. Vanakku (வணக்கு) means "to bend".
- Vaattal (Tamil: வாட்டல்) vegetables or meat scorched in fire. Vaattu (வாட்டு) means "to scorch".

Other condiments that are eaten with rice, Dosai, or Chapathi:

- Pachchadi (Tamil: பச்சடி) usually means a Curd based dish made with freshly grated veggies like carrot, cucumber, chillies, onions, etc. mixed with curd. In Tamil cuisine, it is like the North Indian Raita. Pachadi means to pound. However, Pachchadi can also mean a chili based dish that is slightly cooked (like Mangai pachadi). It has less oil and is eaten only as a side dish. Its shelf life is only one day.
- Thokku (Tamil: தொக்கு) is a robustly-spiced condiment that normally has one ingredient, such as tomatoes or raw mango, as the foundation, which is grated and then undergoes a slow-cooking process until it changes form and deepens in colour. Thokku can be eaten with rice or as a side dish. Thokku-தொக்கு means to pound or grind. For example, Mangai Thokku, Maainji Thokku and Thakkali Thokku fall into this category. It tends to more oil and its shelf life is from three days to seven days.
- Oorukaai (Tamil: ஊறுகாய்) includes more oil for preservation purposes. It is known as a pickle in English and “Achaar” in Hindi. Its shelf life usually stretches from around six months to twelve months.

=== Fritters & fried items ===
- Vattral (Tamil: வற்றல்) is dehydrated or usually sun-dried vegetable(s) like Brinjal, cluster beans, chillies, onion, tomatoes, etc. In Vattral there shouldn't be any moisture at all. This is consumed after it is deep fried in oil.
- Vadagam (Tamil: வடகம்) is more or less equivalent to the Marathi “Vadi” dish. It falls under the Vattral (வற்றல்) category.
- Appalam (Tamil: அப்பளம்) is a sundried thin circular shaped food made of lentils like Urad dal or grains like rice. It comes under the Vattral (வற்றல்) category. This is also consumed after deep frying in oil.
- Vadai (Tamil: வடை)
- Bajji (Tamil: பஜ்ஜி)
- Bonda (Tamil: போண்டா)

== Regional cuisine ==
Each area where Tamils have lived has developed its own distinct variant of the common dishes. The four divisions of ancient Tamilakam each prepare their own unique Tamil cuisine.

=== Chola Nadu ===
The cuisine of the Chola Nadu region specializes in several dishes such as sevai and other varieties associated with different sauces like chutney. The most common dishes are from Chidambaram. Kumbakonam is famous for its filter coffee. The Thanjavur region is one of the prominent producers of rice-based dishes like puliyodharai, sambar soru, vegetable rice and podi soru. Millet dishes like kutharai vali dosai are also prepared, and freshwater fish from the area of Thiruchirapalli are famous for their unique taste.

=== Pandiya Nadu ===
The Chettinad region and its adjoining areas, such as Karaikudi, are famous for their typical spicy cuisine also known as chettinad cuisine. Dishes like idiyappam, uthappam, paniyaram as well as meat dishes are common in this region. The Madurai region has its own unique dishes such as Muttaiparotta, Paruthipal, Karidosai, Jasmine Idli, Irameen Kuzhambu and it is the place of origin of the milk dessert Jigarthanda. Non vegetarian dishes from Thirunelveli, Madurai and its adjoining areas are one of the most renowned among the South Indians. The Virudhunagar region is famous for the Coin Parotta. Unlike the traditional way of preparation, Coin Parotta is generally deep fried in oil and served with mutton gravy.

=== Kongu Nadu ===
Kongu Nadu cuisine was originally prepared in rural areas. Oputtu, Sandahai and Kola urundai are few among the main dishes. Many dishes in Kongu Nadu are coconut- and onion-based as the region has an abundant supply of coconut, onions and groundnuts. Thengai paal jaggery, Ulundu Kali, Kachayam, Arisimparupu soru, Kelvaragu Puttumavu, Arisi Puttumavu, Paniyaram, Kelvaragu Pakoda, Thengai barbi, Kadalai urundai, Ellu urundai, and Pori urundai are among other dishes prepared by Tamil people. Most people living in the region usually consume mutton, chicken, freshwater fishes and quail as the region is landlocked. Arisimparupu soru is a unique dish. Most common oils are sesame and groundnut oil. Coconut oil is used for main cooking and as well as seasoning in certain Kongu Nadu dishes.

=== Tondaimandalam ===
The cuisine of this region is hot and spicy dishes are prepared. Idli, dosai, Idiyappam, bhajji, koottu, murukku, vada curry, chicken pakoda, beef chilli and chicken 65 are common dishes in this region. Ambur biryani from Ambur known for its spicy biriyani, made with seeraga samba rice. Popular staple dish like Chicken 65 and Masala dosai originated from Chennai.

== Tamil culinary words in English ==
- "Curry" comes from the Tamil word kari.
- The Tamil phrase milagu thanneer refers to "pepper soup", literally pepper water or mulligatawny
- "Congee" is derived from the Tamil word kanji.
- "Mango" came to English via Portuguese, which got it from the Tamil maankai.

== Dishes ==
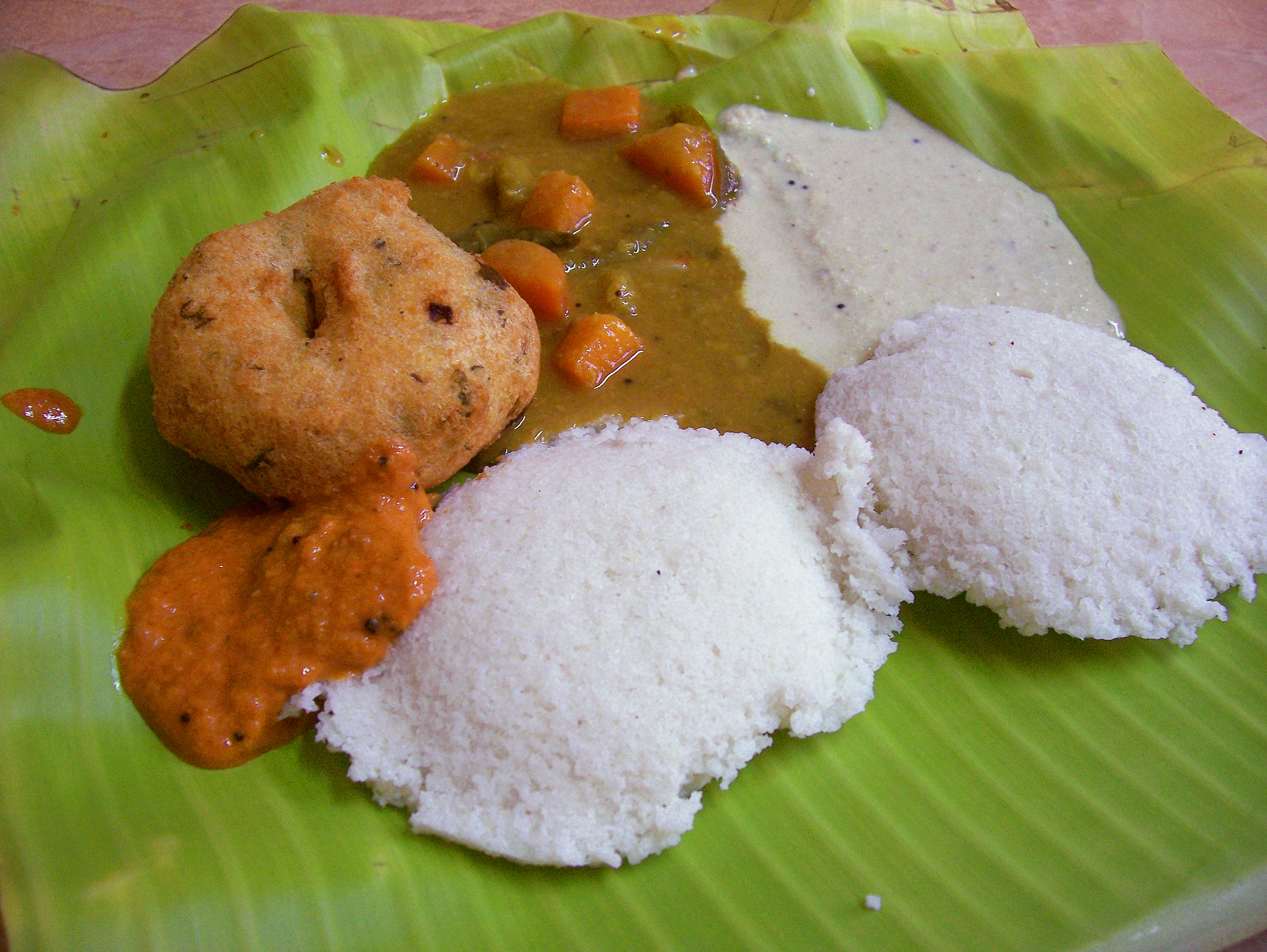
Idly and Medu Vada (Ulundhu Vadai) with tomato chutney, Sambhar and coconut chutney served on banana leaf

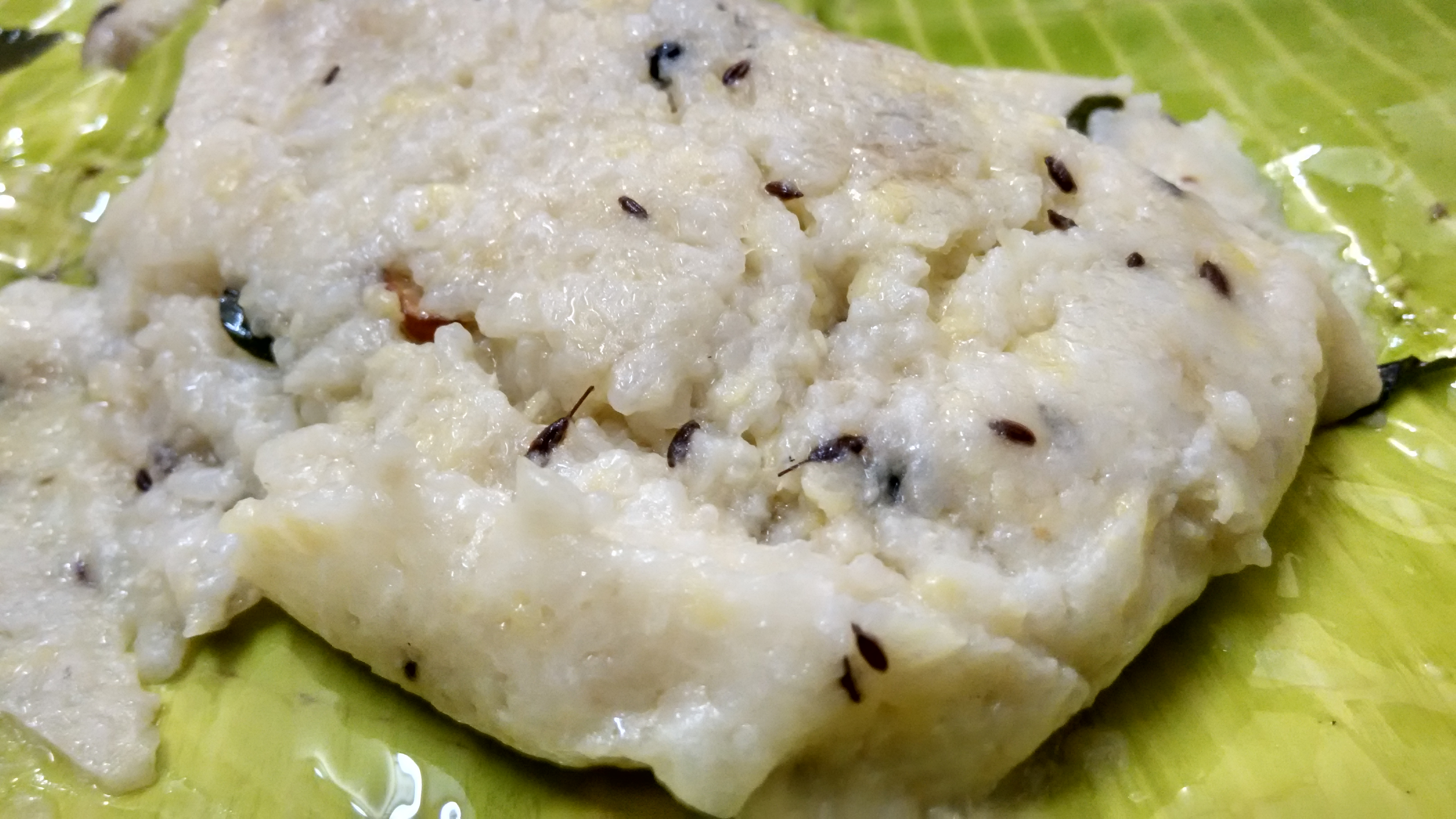
Ven Pongal

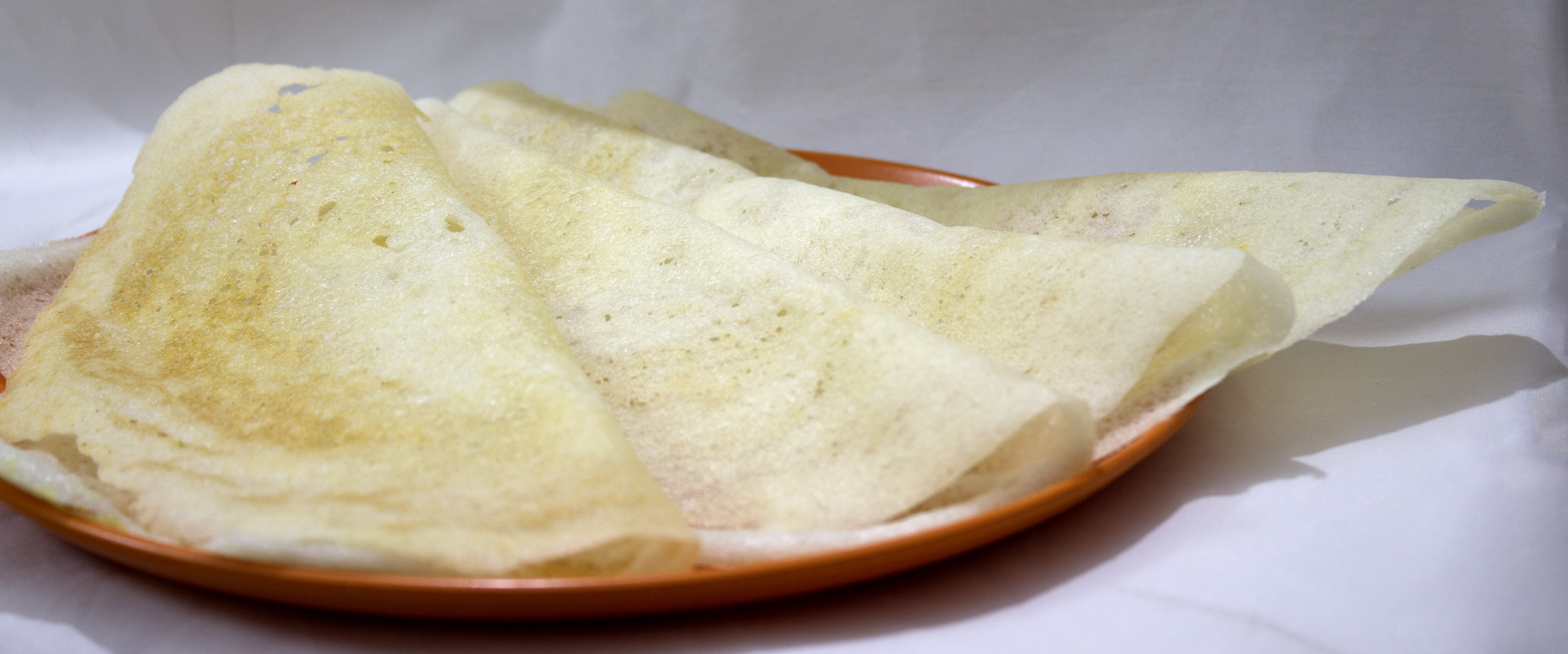
Dosai made at home

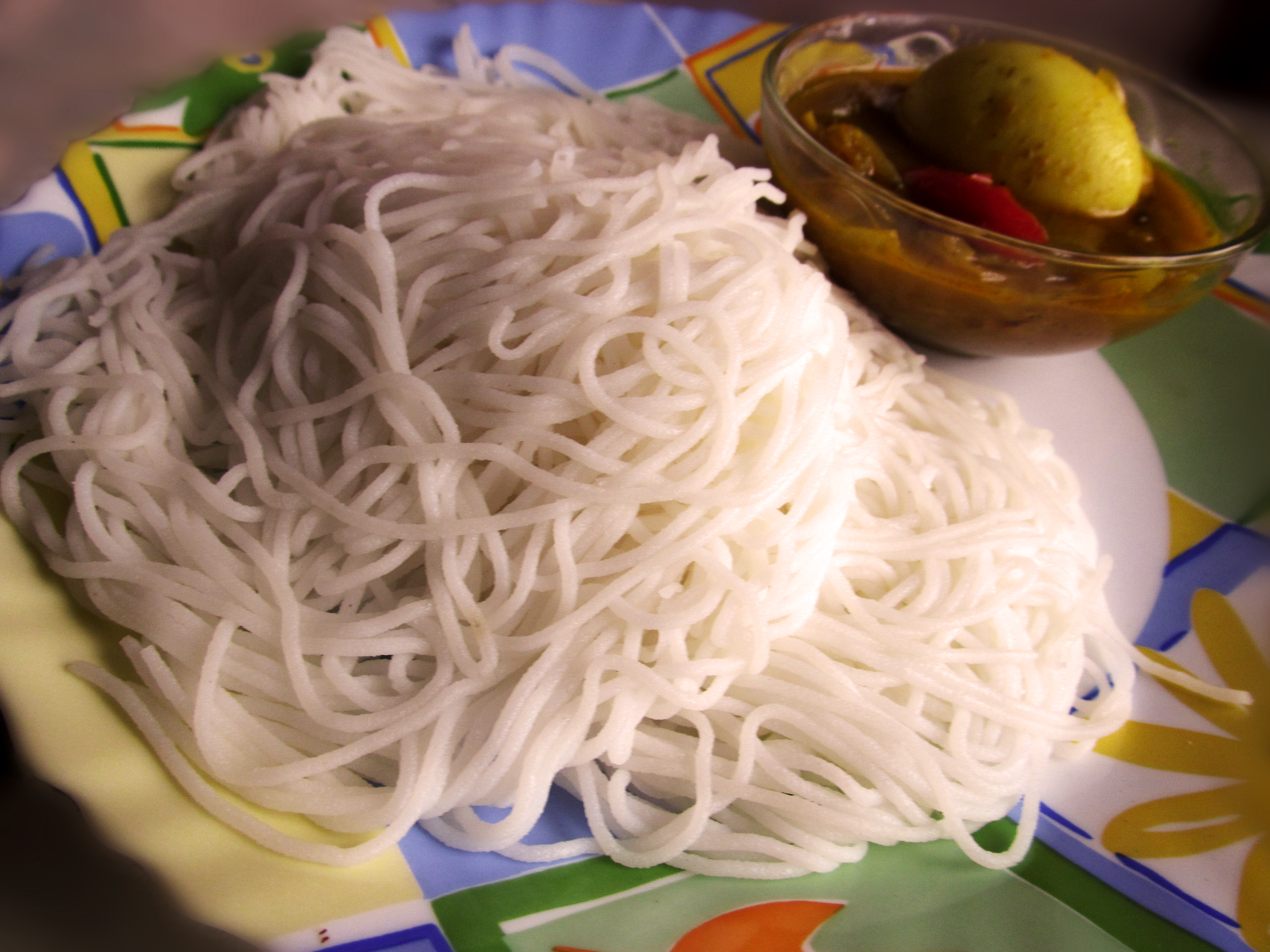
Idiyappam

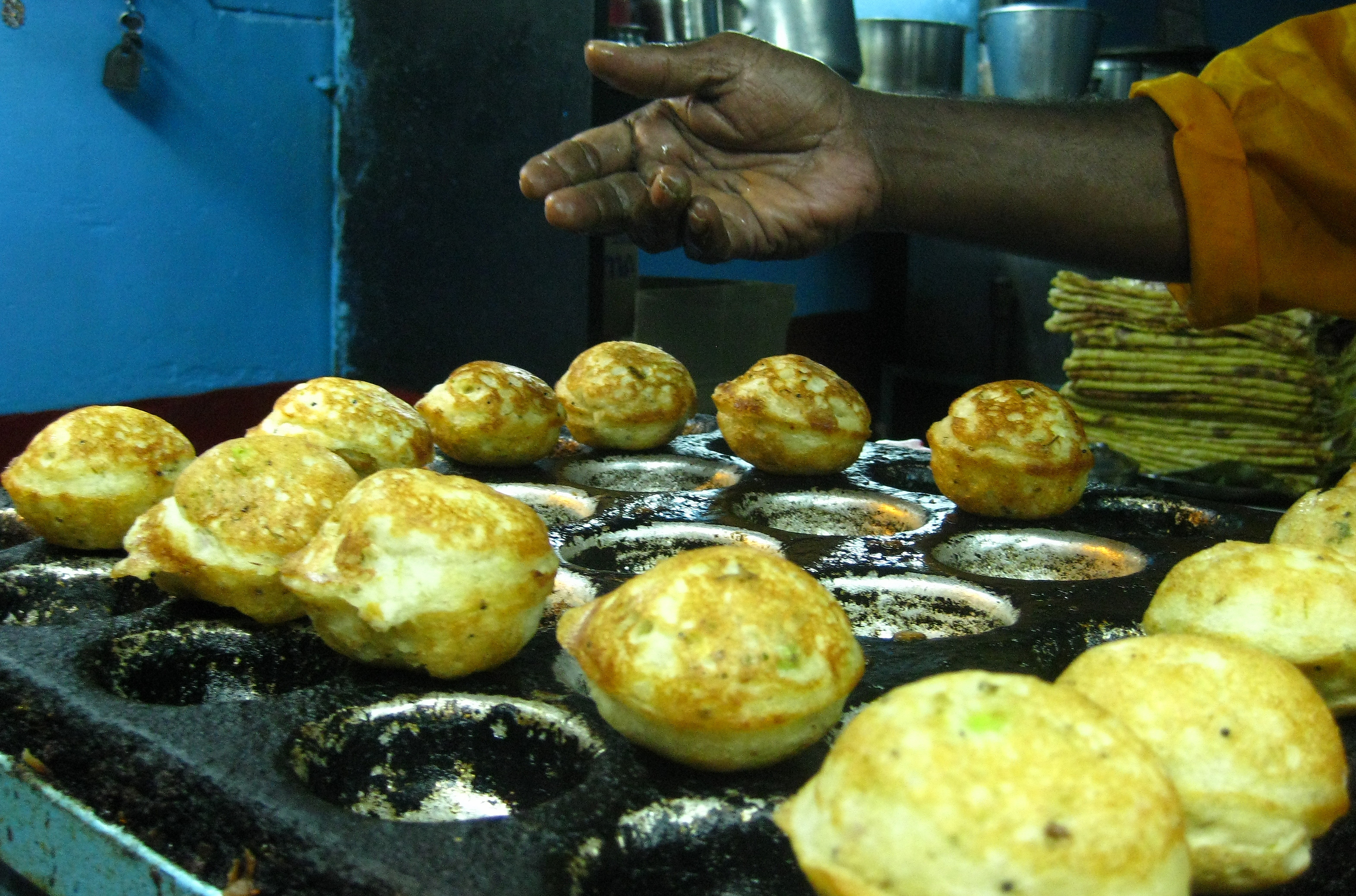
Kuzhi Paniyaram

Rice is the staple food of most Tamil people. It is generally eaten during lunch and sometimes dinner. Soru (Tamil word for 'rice') is served along with other food items such as sambar, poriyal, rasam, kootu, Keerai, and curd.

=== Breakfast dishes ===
==== Starchy dishes ====
- Idli is a steamed rice-cake prepared with fermented batter or rice and black gram. It is usually served with different kinds of traditional dishes such as chutney, sambhar or vadacurry.
- Dosa is prepared from a fermented batter and black gram with a small quantity of sambar or chutney. Several varieties like saada dosai, kal dosai, Paper roast, muttai dosai, neer dosai, rava dosai, raagi dosai and paasi paruppu dosai are prominently available in Tamil Nadu.
- Vadai is a crispy donut shaped spicy dish usually served along with idlis.
- Pongal is a traditional cuisine where rice is cooked in a paaṉai with water and milk. The word (pongal) directly translates to the action of boiling over the container due to the starch.
- Upma or Uppumavu is a dish of thick porridge from dry-roasted semolina or coarse rice flour. The different names for the dish derive from the combinations of the word uppu, meaning salt in Tamil and mavu, meaning ground grain meal in Tamil.
- Paniyaram is a dumpling shaped dish made using dosa batter.
- Appam is prepared with a fermented batter of rice and black gram mixture. Appam generally has thin corners with a soft and thick center. It is soaked in coconut milk before serving.
- Uthappam is a dosa-based dish that is slightly thick, fluffy, and soft. It can be made from regular idli or dosai batter.
- Puttu is a steamed, layered, cylindrical cake made from flour or rice.
- Kozhakkattai is a steamed sweet dumpling made with rice flour.
- Sevai or idiyappam are rice noodles usually in steamed rice cakes. They are sometimes served soaked in coconut milk.

==== Side dishes ====
- Sambar is a lentil-based vegetable stew or chowder made with tamarind, broth, freshly grounded spices, vegetables and lentils.
- Chutney varieties consumed by the people are coconut chutney, onion chutney, tomato chutney, coriander chutney, kara chutney, garlic chutney, malaatai chutney, and puli chutney.
- Vada curry is a classic dish that is also famous among Chennai people.
- Thovaiyal is a wet ground paste that contains several ingredients.
- Sambal is condiment mostly accompanied for rice, string hoppers and hoppers in Tamil parts of Sri Lanka.
- Sodhi is a coconut milk based dish best made for hoppers and string hoppers in Tamil parts of Sri Lanka and Tirunelveli of Tamil Nadu.

==== Drinks ====
- Kaapi is the most popular beverage. Its preparation is generally done with gourmet coffee beans. The preparation of filter coffee is a ritual. Sometimes chicory is added to enhance the aroma. Hot milk with sugar and a small quantity of decoction is then served in a tumbler set, a traditional coffee cup.
- Koozh (also known as Conjee) and is made with different lentils like raagi.
- Sharbat is a drink made from fruits or petal flowers.
- Panakam is a drink made from lemon juice or tamarind water, jaggery, dried ginger, and cardamom.

=== Lunch and dinner dishes ===
==== Main dishes ====
- Plain rice

===== Rice dishes =====
- Thakkali choru – Tomato rice, Tomato coconut milk rice
- Sambar choru – Rice cooked with lentils, vegetables with a glaze of tamarind juice
- Thengai choru – Coconut rice
- Milagu choru – Pepper rice
- Paruppu choru – Lentil rice
- Karuvepillai choru – Curry leaves rice
- Thayir choru – Curd rice
- Nei choru – Ghee rice
- Urulai choru – Potato rice
- Muttaikos choru – Cabbage rice
- Kudaimilagai choru – Capsicum rice
- Kootanchoru – Mixed vegetable rice
- Kothamalli Pudina choru – Coriander and mint rice
- Manga choru – Mango rice
- Thatta payaru arisi paruppu choru – Cow pea and lentil rice
- Vetrilai poondu choru – Betel leaves rice with garlic
- Vaṟutta arici – Fried rice
- Brinji Choru
- Elumichai Choru (lemon rice) – A seasoning of onions, tomatoes, curry leaf, red chilly, salt and lemon juice made with rice
- Ghee pongal
- Sweet pongal
- Kalkandu pongal
- Puli pongal – Tamarind pongal
- Thinai pongal – Foxtail millet pongal recipes
- Puliyodarai, is a popular Tamil dish that is a mixture of fried tamarind paste and cooked rice. Fried tamarind paste with sesame oil, asafoetida, fenugreek powder, chilly, groundnuts, chickpea, black gram, mustard seeds, coriander seeds, cumin seeds, 'curry leaves, turmeric powder, jaggery, and salt.
- Biryani such as mutton, chicken and veg briyani

==== Sambar pickles ====
- Vendaikkāi sambar
- Potato, tomato and carrot sambar
- Carrot and beans sambar
- Arachuvitta sambar
- Sambar for idly/dosa/pongal
- Mango Sambar
- Mixed Vegetable Sambar
- Vendhaya Keerai sambar
- Brinjal Sambar
- Onion Arachu vitta Sambar
- Drumstick Sambar Iyer style (without onions)
- Pasi Paruppu Sambar (tiffin sambar)
- No Onion No garlic Carrot Sambar
- Keerai Thandu Sambar
- Mor Sambar/Curd Sambar

==== Rasam soups ====
- Lemon rasam
- Paruppu rasam (tomato rasam)
- Cumin rasam
- Garlic rasam
- Kollu Rasam (horse gram rasam)
- Pepper rasam
- Pineapple rasam
- Tomato rasam
- Neem flower (Veppam Poo) rasam
- Kandathippili (long Pepper (plant) rasam)
- Mint rasam
- Beetroot tomato rasam
- Mutton elumbu rasam (Mutton bone rasam)

==== Kuzhambu curries ====
- Thatta payiru kathirikkai kozhambu/Cow beans Brinjal curry
- Murunga keerai kozhambu/Drumstick leaves curry
- Pidukkam paruppu kozhambu/Shelled field beans curry
- Kaalan kozhambu/Mushroom curry
- Vendhaya kozhambu/Fenugreek seeds curry
- Mochai kozhambu/Field beans curry
- Pattani kuzhambu/Dry peas curry
- Ennai kathrikkai kozhambu/Oily eggplant spicy curry
- Vendaikkaai kaara kozhambu/Ladies finger spicy curry
- Kathrikkai kaara kozhambu/Brinjal spicy curry
- Mulai payaru kozhambu/Moong sprouts curry
- Ulli theeyal/Onion theeyal curry
- Kadalai theeyal/Channa theeyal curry
- Murungakkai theeyal/Drumstick theeyal curry
- Mochai theeyal/Field beans theeyal curry
- Poondu theeyal/Garlic theeyal curry
- Peerkangaai paal kozhambu/Ridgegourd curry
- Kollu kozhambu/Horse gram curry
- Keera kadaisal/Spinach smash curry
- Avarakkai paruppu kuzhambu/Broad beans lentil curry
- Milagai mandi/Green chilli curry
- Kaaramani puli kozhambu/Black eyed tamarind curry
- Urundai kozhambu/Lentil dumplings curry
- Murungakkai puli kozhambu/Drumstick tamarind curry
- Poondu kozhambu/Garlic tamarind curry
- Poosani paruppu kootu/Pumpkin lentil curry
- Vatha kozhambu/Turkey berry, black night shade curry
- Soya kozhambu/Soya curry
- Sakkarai valli kizhangu kozhambu/Sweet potato curry
- Pavakkaai pitla/Bittergourd curry
- Pavakkaai puli kozhambu/Bitter gourd tamarind curry
- Jeeraga kozhambu/Jeera seeds curry
- Milagu kozhambu/Pepper corns curry
- Karunai kizhangu kozhambu/Yam curry

==== Poriyal stir-fries ====
- Parangikkaai ellu poriyal/Pumpkin fry curry with sesame seeds
- Arasanikaai poriyal/Yellow pumpkin fry
- Sorakkaai verkaadalai poriyal/Calabash peanuts fry
- Kizhangu pottalam/Madurai potato fry masala
- Senai kizhangu poriyal/Yam roast in banana leaves
- Urulai milagu varuval/Potato pepper fry
- Senai chops/Yam chops
- Vengaaya thalai poriyal/Spring onion fry
- Murungakeerai poriyal/Drumstick leaves fry
- Urulai podimaas/Potato podimas
- Ennai kathrikkaai masala/Stuffed small eggplant oily masala
- Chinna vengaayam poriyal/Shallots fry
- Kaaramani poriyal/Yard long beans fry
- Carrot beans thovaran/Carrot beans in coconut masala fry
- Vendhaya keerai kadalai poriyal/Methi leaves channa fry
- Cheppankizhangu varuval/Arbi fry
- Chettinad urulai poriyal/Chettinad spicy potato fry
- Chettinad urulai pattani poriyal/Chettinad spicy potato peas fry
- Agathi keerai poriyal/Agathi keerai fry
- Avarakkai poriyal/Broad beans coconut fry
- Kovakkai poriyal/Ivy gourd fry
- Carrot kose poriyal/Carrot cabbage fry
- Kaalan milagu varuval/Mushroom pepper fry
- Vendakkaai poriyal/Ladiesfinger fry
- Beetroot poriyal/Beetroot coconut fry
- Chow chow poriyal/Chayote squash fry
- Vaazhakkai podimas/Raw banana fry
- Peerkangaai poriyal/Ridgegourd fry
- Mullangi poriyal/Raddish fry
- Maravalli kizhangu poriyal/Tapioca stir fry
- Thanneer muttaan kizhangu poriyal/Asparagus fry
- Pudalangaai poriyal/Snake gourd fry
- Payaru thovaran/Green gram fry
- Pappaalikkai poriyal/Raw papaya fry
- Vendhaya keerai poriyal/Fenugreek leaves fry
- Kudaimilagaai milagu poriyal/Capsicum pepper fry
- Cauliflower milagu pirattal/Cauliflower pepper fry

==== Kootu stews ====
- Vaazhaipoo kootu/Plantain flower stew
- Vendakkai kootu/Ladiesfinger stew
- Murungakeerai paruppu usili/Drumstick leaves lentil stew
- Paruppu beans usili/Beans and lentils stew
- Kootaviyal/Aviyal cooked with all country veggies
- Keerai mandi/Chettinad spinach stew
- Sorakkaai kootu/Bottle gourd stew
- Vaazhai thandu kootu/Plantain stem curd stew
- Keerai paruppu poondu kootu/Spinach lentil garlic stew
- Mulakeerai kootu/Amarnath leaves lentil stew
- Pudalangai kootu/Snake gourd stew
- Kothavarangaai kootu/Cluster beans stew
- Poosanikkai kootu/Yellow pumpkin lentil stew
- Manathakkaali keera kootu/Black night shade leaves lentil stew
- Chow chow kootu/Chayote squash stew
- Thakkali kaai kootu/Green tomato lentil stew
- Kathrikkai rasavaangi/Eggplant lentil stew
- Mor keerai kootu/Buttermilk spinach stew
- Muttaikose kootu/Cabbage lentil stew
- Pachai payaru kootu/Moong bean stew
- Poosanikaai mor kootu/Ash gourd curd stew
- senai kizhangu kootu/Elephant yam stew
- Kadamba kootu/Mixed vegetable stew
- Noolkol kootu/Kohlrabi stew
- Tirunelveli Sodhi
- Murungakkai kootu/Drumstick lentil stew
- Avarakkaai kootu/Broadbeans lentil stew
- Kathrikka kootu/Brinjal stew
- Sutta kathirkkai Gotsu/Burnt Brinjal stew
- Parangikkaai paal kootu/Pumpkin stew in coconut milk
- Pappaalikkaai kootu/Raw papaya stew
- Palakkaai kootu/Raw Jackfruit stew
- Vallaarai keerai kootu/Brahmi booti stew

==== Chicken dishes ====
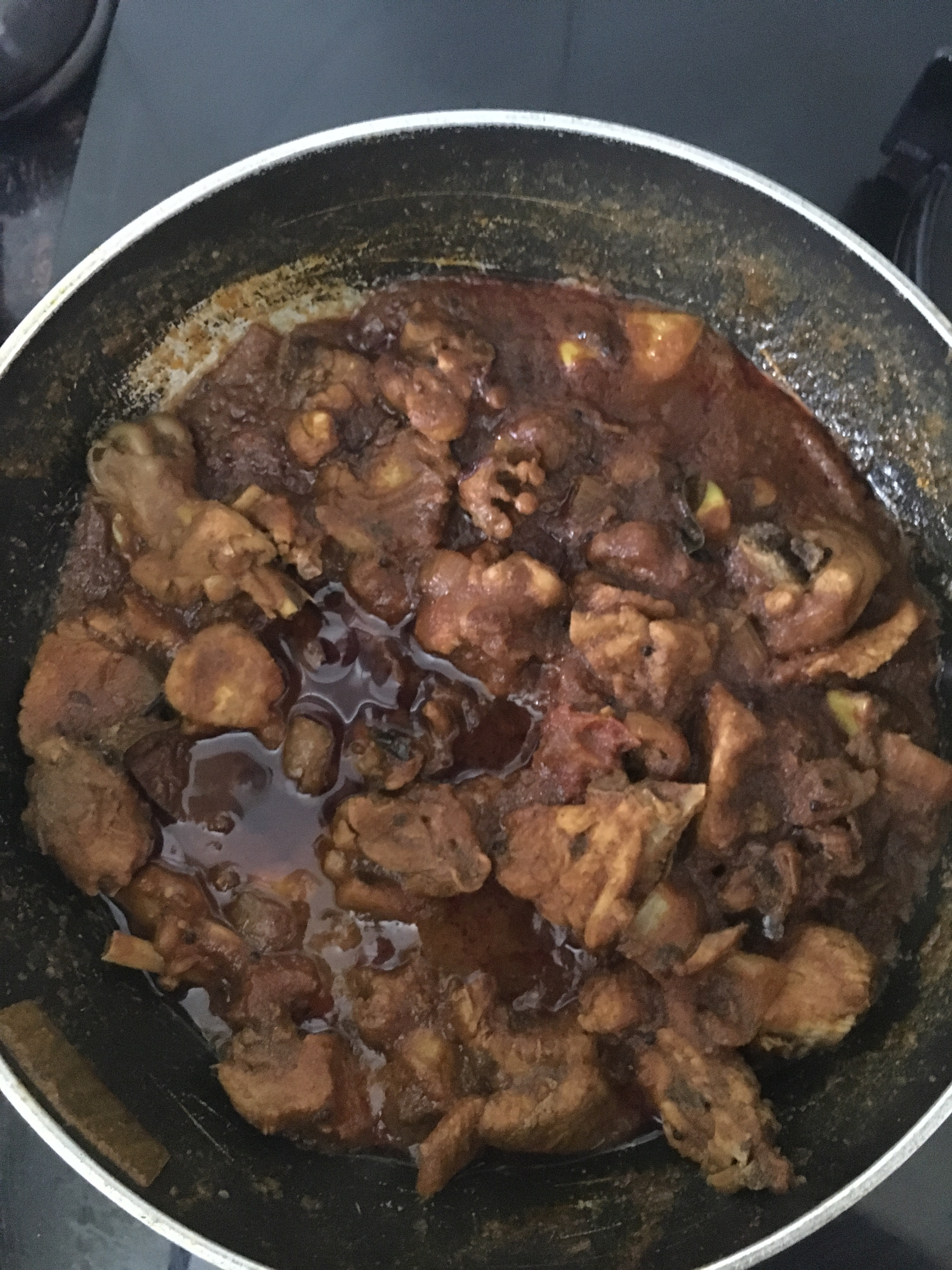
Chicken Curry for Rice

- Arachivitta kozhi curry (Chicken in spicy thick coconut gravy)
- Varuthu aracha kozhi curry (Chicken in spicy fried and ground coconut gravy)
- Kozhi milagu varuval (Chicken pepper fry)
- Kozhi vellai kuruma (Chicken in white gravy)
- Chicken 65
- Chicken pakora
- Chicken sukka
- Chicken ghee roast
- Kozhi milagu masala (Chicken pepper masala)
- Naatu Kozhi kuzhambu (Country chicken curry)
- Naatu kozhi rasam (Chicken soup)
- Chicken Chinthamani
- Kozhi pachai curry (Chicken coriander and mint curry)
- Pallipaalayam chicken fry
- Chicken Kola urundai kozhambu (Chicken dumplings curry)
- Madras kozhi kozhambu (Madras chicken curry)
- Chicken Chettinad
- Seeraga samba chicken biryani (Chicken biryani cooked with Seeraga samba rice)
- Ambur chicken biryani
- Thalapakkatti chicken biryani
- Chicken 65 biryani
- Kovai biriyani

==== Mutton dishes ====
- Aatukkal paaya (Mutton trotters stew)
- Nenju elumbu soup (Mutton rib bones soup)
- Mutton kuzhambu/curry
- Mutton korma in thick coconut gravy
- Mutton in fried ground coconut gravy
- Mutton elumbu rasam (Mutton bone soup)
- Nalli elumbu masala (Goat Bone marrow masala)
- Mutton curry dosa
- Ratha poriyal (Goat blood fry)
- Mutton Sukka
- Mutton milagu varuval (Mutton pepper fry)
- Mutton Kola urundai kozhambu (Mutton dumplings curry)
- Kongunaadu vella mutton biryani (Kongunaad White mutton biryani)
- Seeraga samba mutton biryani (Mutton biryani cooked with Seeraga samba rice)
- Ambur Mutton biryani
- Thalapakkatti Mutton biryani

==== Seafood dishes ====
- Meen puli muzham (Fish in thick coconut tamarind gravy)
- Meen karutha curry (Fish black curry in fried coconut, shallots, garlic, dried ginger, peppercorns, coriander seeds, red chillies, oregano, and other spices)
- Thengai paal meen curry (Fish in spicy coconut milk gravy)
- Sura puttu (Fishpittu)
- Iraal masala (Prawn spicy masala)
- Iraal milagu varuval (Spicy prawn pepper fry)
- Coconut fish fry
- Nethili meen curry (White bait/anchovies curry)
- Nethili meen varuval (Spicy deep fried anchovies)
- Prawn ghee roast
- Fish briyani
- Prawn briyani
- Meen maanga curry (Fish mango curry)
- Spicy chettinad prawn masala
- Fish curry in ginger and coconut milk
- Spicy Vanjaram fry (Spicy salmon fry)
- Chettinad fish curry
- Nandu masala (Crab curry)
- Nandu omelette (Crab omelette)
- Nandu rasam (Crab soup)
- Chippi appam – an appetizer made with curried rice flour and oysters. This is a favorite among the Muslim population in the Kanyakumari District.

==== Egg dishes ====
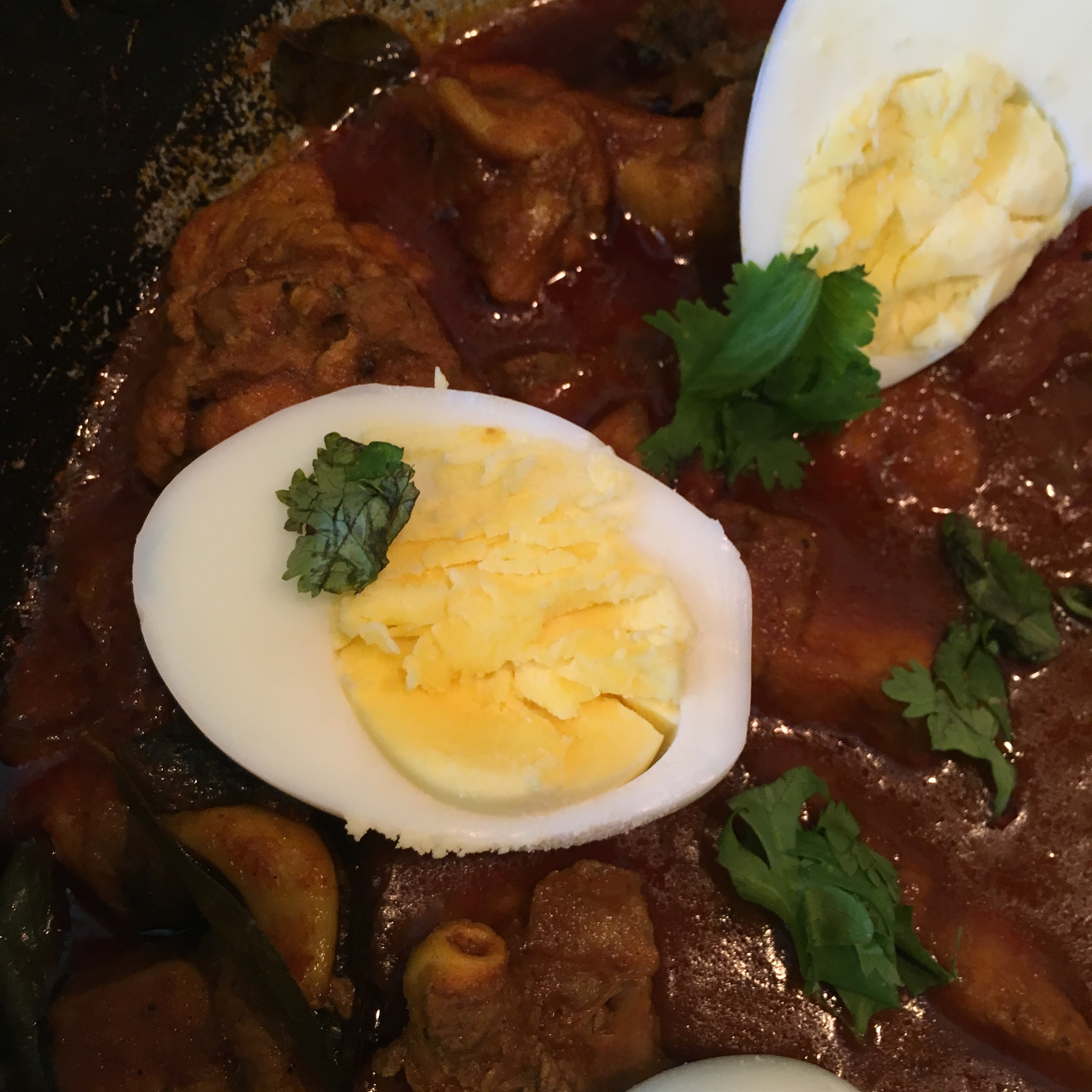
Chicken & Egg Curry for Rice

* Muttai thokku (Egg masala)
- Muttai aviayal (Egg aviyal)
- Muttai milagu varuval (Egg pepper fry)
- Chettinad (spicy egg curry)
- Muttai paniyaaram (Egg Paniyaaram)
- Odachi oothina muttai curry (Egg poached curry)
- Muttai kalakki (Egg Kalakki)
- Muttai korma
- Egg in thick coconut milk gravy
- Egg in spicy coconut and tamarind gravy
- Udachu vitta Mutta Kaara Kuzhambu
- Mutta kuzhambu

=== Sweet dishes ===
- Arisi thengai payasam (Rice coconut pudding)
- Pasiparuppu paaysam (Moong dhal pudding)
- Kadalai paruppu paayasam (channa dhal pudding)
- Aval paayasam (Puffed rice pudding)
- Khasa khasa paayasam (Poppy seeds pudding)
- Vazhai pazha paayasam (Banana pudding)
- Adai Paayasam (Cooked rice flakes pudding)
- Paal Paayasam (Milk pudding)
- Thengai Paayasam (Coconut pudding)
- Pala pazha Paayasam (Jackfruit pudding)
- Mampazha paayasam (Mango pudding)
- Javvarisi paaysam (Tapioca sago pudding)
- Samba godhumai paayasam (Cracked wheat pudding)
- Semiya paayasam (Vermicelli pudding)
- Thinai paaysam (Foxtail millet pudding)
- Carrot paayasam (Carrot pudding)
- Badam paayasam (Badam pudding)
- Rice paayasam (Rice pudding)
- Sorakkai paayasam (Calabash pudding)
- Elaneer paaysam (Tender coconut pudding)
- Brown rice kheer
- Sweet potato kheer
- Apple kheer
- Thengai bholi (Coconut bholi)
- kadalai paruppu bholi
- Then mittai (Honey comb sweet)
- Ingi marappa (Ginger fudge)
- Pori urundai (Puffed rice jaggery balls)
- Kadalai mittai (Peanut jaggery balls)
- Maaladdu
- Paasi paruppu laddu
- Rava laddu (Rava sweet balls)
- Thinai laddu (Fox millet sweet balls)
- Godhumai laddu (Wheat sweet balls)
- Kezhvaragu nilakadalai laddu
- Ellurundai (Black sesame seeds sweet balls)
- Vella ellurundai (White sesame seeds sweet balls)
- Coconut laddu (Coconut sweet balls)
- Aval laddu (Poha sweet balls)
- Sweet somas
- Suyyam
- Kandhar appam
- Mangaadi (Sweet mango in jaggery stew)
- Sakkapalathirattu (Jack fruit in jaggery stew)
- Thirattu paal (Paalkova)
- Palambali (Kongunaadu style rice pudding)
- Appam
- Nei appam
- Unni appam
- Ammini kozhukattai
- Poornam kozhukattai
- Adhirasam
- Aravanai
- Paal kozhukattai
- Pazham Paniyaram
- Sakkarai kozhukattai
- Sakkarai Pongal (Sweet pongal)
- Aval pongal
- Kalkandu pongal (Sugar candy pongal)
- Sweet seedai
- Puttamudhu
- Mundhiri Kothu
- Akkaravadisal
- Jangiri
- Rava Kesari
- Pineapple kesari
- Mango kesari
- Aval kesari
- Halwa varieties:
  - thirunelveli halwa
  - ashoka halwa
  - jackfruit halwa
  - wheat halwa
  - pineapple halwa

=== Snacks ===
- Murukku
- Seedai
- Bajji
- Kara Sev
- Pakoda
- bonda
- types of vadai (ulundhu, Kara, aamai)
- Thattu vadai/nippetu'
- Boondhi
- Kara pori
- aval pori

==== Pickles ====
- Elumichanga oorkaai (Lemon pickle)
- Poondu oorkaai (Garlic pickle)
- Ingi oorkaai (Ginger pickle)
- Thakkali oorkaai (Tomato pickle)
- Vengaaya oorkaai (Onion pickle)
- Mangaa oorkaai (Mango pickle)
- Nellikaai oorkaai (Gooseberry pickle)
- Naarthangaai oorkaai (Citron pickle)
- Carrot oorkaai
- Milaga oorkaai (Green Chilly pickle)
- Red Chilli pickle
- Sun dried tomato pickle
- Maavadu
- Mor Milgai (Sun dried big chillies)
- Puli ingi (Ginger tamarind pickle)

==== Podi chutney powders ====
These are the dry chutney powder varieties to be mixed with cooked plain rice or ghee.

- Paruppu podi (Lentil chutney powder)
- Poondu podi (Garlic chutney powder)
- Idly milagu podi (Idly chutney powder) as a side dish for idly and dosas
- karuveppilai podi (Curry leaf chutney powder)
- Milagu podi (Pepper chutney powder)
- Ellu podi (Sesame seed chutney powder)
- Kollu podi (Horse gram chutney powder)
- Nilakadalai podi (Groundnut chutney powder)
- Kothamalli podi (Coriander chutney powder)
- Mint chutney powder
- Raw banana chutney powder for infants and toddlers

== See also ==
- Tamil
- Cuisine of India
- Cuisine of Pondicherry
