= Koottu =

Lentil and vegetable stew from India

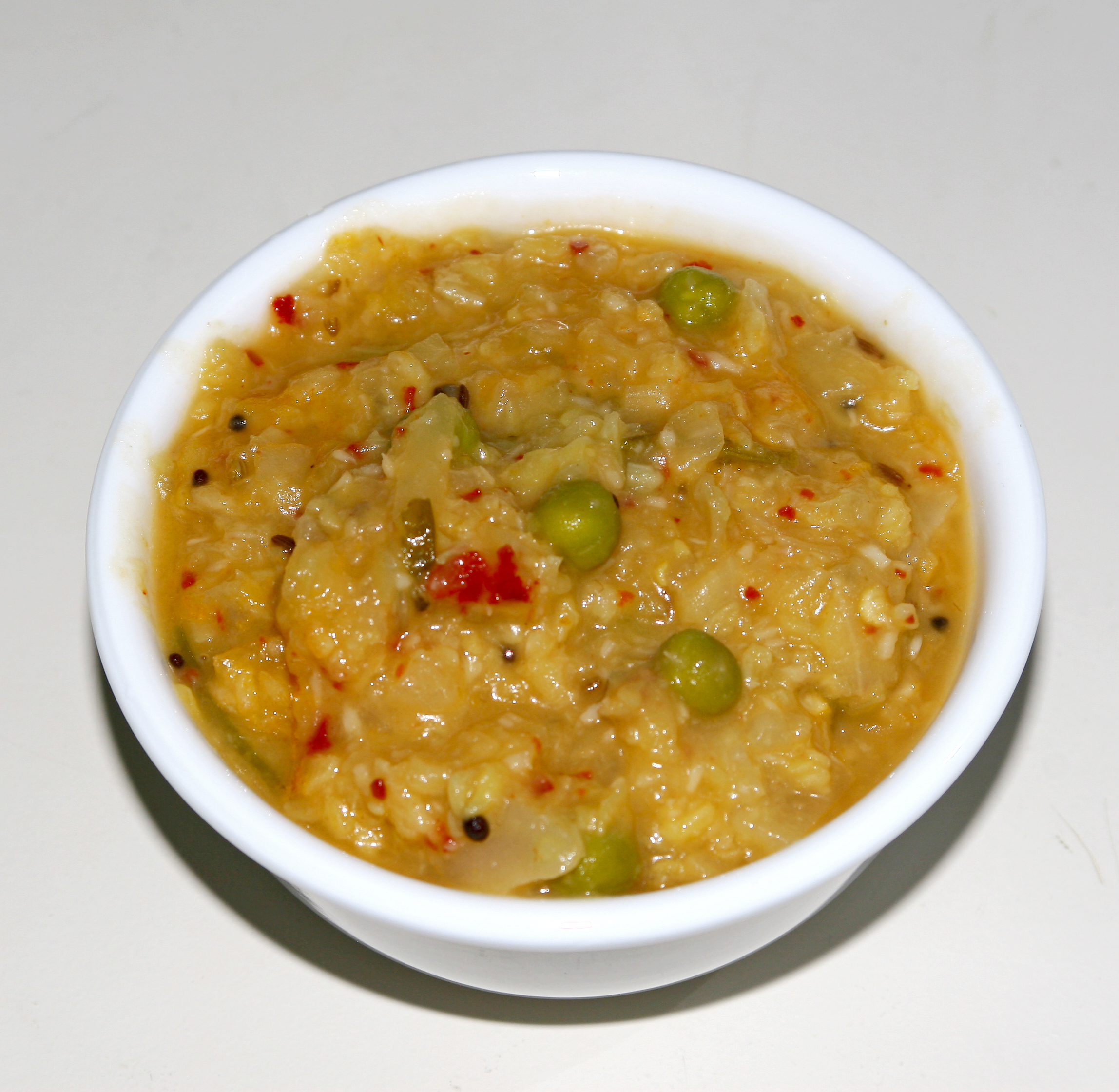
- Type: Stew
- Place of origin: India
- Main ingredients: Vegetable, lentils

Koottu (Tamil:கூட்டு), often transcribed "kootu", is a lentil and spicy vegetable stew in South Indian, particularly Tamil and Kerala cuisines. The etymology for koottu derives from the Tamil word "koottu" which means "add" or "mixture/medley" i.e. vegetable added with lentils form the dish, which is semi-solid in consistency. The dish is noted for its nutty and complex flavors and textures, likely owing to the liberal addition of lentils and coconuts. It is typically less watery than sambhar, but more so than dry stir-fries. Virundhu Sappadu (typical Tamil feast) comes with a combination of boiled rice (Choru in Tamil), sambar, rasam, curd, poriyal, koottu, appalam, pickles and banana. All koottus by default have some vegetables and lentils, but many variations of koottu exist:

- Poricha Koottu: A koottu made with urad dhal and pepper is called poricha (means "fried" using oil in Tamil) koottu. Fried urad dhal, pepper, few red chilies, some cumin and fresh coconut are ground together. Moong dhal and the cut vegetables are cooked separately. Then, the ground paste, cooked vegetables and moong dhal are mixed and heated. Vegetables such as beans and snake gourd are common ingredients in this koottu.
- Araichivita Koottu: A koottu which has a powdered (freshly ground) masala in it; the word araichivita in Tamil literally translates to "the one which has been ground and poured." The ground paste is a mixture of fried urid dhal, cumin seeds and coconut.
- Araichivita sambar: The chopped vegetables and toor dhal are cooked separately. Then, the ground paste, cooked vegetable and dhal are heated together. Then add the ground paste of coconut, Bengal gram, coriander, red chilies, a few pepper corns, a piece of cinnamon (optionally) - all roasted and ground. Season with mustard seeds and fenugreek seeds. Add the vegetables, including shallots (known as "Madras onions" in India), saute and then add water. Add tamarind extract, and then the ground paste and boiled dal. Served with rice.

Many other regional variations exist.

== See also ==
- List of stews
