= Nidudavolu Venkatarao =

Indian writer

Nidadavolu Venkatarao
- Born: 3 January 1903; Vizianagaram, Madras Presidency, British India (now in Andhra Pradesh, India)
- Died: 15 October 1982 (aged 79); Hyderabad, Andhra Pradesh
- Citizenship: India
- Education: M. A.
- Alma mater: Madras University, Chennai
- Occupations: Reader, Madras University..Emeritus Professor (UGC) Osmania
- Spouse: Palakodeti Lakshmikanthamma
- Children: 5 sons and 2 daughters (Sundareswara Rao, Parvatheeswara Rao, Jagga Rao, Sarveswara Rao, Suryanarayan, Joga Bai, Lakshmi)
- Relatives: See Nidudavolu Family and also his cousin sister Nidadavolu Malathi a famous telugu writer (Thulika.net). Malathi's Daughter is Sarayu (Hollywood and TV actress of USA.
- Writing career
- Period: 1943-1964
- Genres: Scholar, Poet, literary Historian, Writer
- Subject: Telugu Literature

Nidudavolu Venkatarao (3 January 1903 – 15 October 1982) was an Indian littérateur, and historian in the Telugu language. He was regarded as "Jangama Vijnanasvarasvam" in Telugu ("Moving encyclopedia"). Venkatarao was a Lecturer, Reader and Head of the Department of Telugu at the University of Madras. While he was working in Madras university, he undertook a little-known work 'tripurantakodaaharanam', and published it with elaborate annotations in 1935.

He continued to work on the genre, udaaharana vanjmayam, and published udaaharana vanjmaya charitra (History of udaaharana literature). Among his other works with extensive revisions, Panditaraadhya charitra, Basava Puranam, and Poets in South Indian Literature are considered valuable in the history of Telugu literature.

After his retirement, he moved to Hyderabad. He was a Professor of University Grants Commission, a special position created for retired professors, 1964–1968. Venkatarao embraced Saivaite tradition in his life. He died on Shivaratri day at midnight on 15 October 1982, at the age of 79 in Hyderabad. His grand daughter Jayasudha is an actress in Telugu cinema.

== Early life ==
He was born to Nidudavolu Sundaram Pantulu and Jogamma on 3 January 1903 in Vizianagaram town in Andhra Pradesh, India. He was married to Palakodeti Lakshmi Kanthamma and he had five sons and two daughters. His eldest son, Sundareswara Rao was also a well-known research scholar.

Venkatarao started as a clerk in the Imperial Bank of India (now State Bank of India) in Vizianagaram in 1926. After a year, he was transferred to Kakinada, where he worked until 1939 where he met with the Pithapuram Maharaja, who invited him to work on his dictionary project, Suryarayandhra Nighantuvu. In 1940, he went to Madras to earn his M. A. Degree and returned to Kakinada to work as a lecturer in a college. In 1942, he returned to Madras University, where he worked as lecturer, reader and Head of the Department of Telugu until 1964.

== Literary works ==
This is partial List of the works by Nidudavolu Venkatarao:

- Cinnayasuri jeevitamu: Paravastu Chinnayasuri krutha Hindu dhramasastra sangrahamu sahitamugaa, 1962
- Dakshinadeseeyandhra vanjmayamu, The Southern School of Telugu Literature. (With preface in English) 1954
- Kopparapu sodarakavula charitra. 1973.
- Nannechodunu kavitaavaibhavamu: Nannechoduni padyaalaku ruchira vyakhyaanamu.. 1976.
- Potana. 1962.
- Telugu kavula charitra. 1956.
- Udaaharana vanjmaya charitra. 1968
- Vijayanagara samsthaanamu: Andhra vanjmaya poshana. 1965.
- Andhra vachana vanjmayamu. 1977.
- Andhra vachana vanjmayamu: pracheena kalamu nundi 1900 A.D. varaku. 1954
- Bhamaakalaapamu, edited by P. Jayamma. 1999

== Prefaces and commentaries ==
- Sri Nachana Somanathuni hamsaadibakopakhyanamu (uttara harivamsamu, chaturtha aswaasamu). Commentary by Nidudavolu Venkatarao. 1972.

== Editions and revisions ==
- Sivatatthva saaramu by Mallikarjuna Panditaaraadhyulu. Edited with extensive annotations by Nidudavolu Venkatarao, 1968.
- Prabodha chandrodayamu by Nandi Mallaya. Edited by Nidudavolu Venkatarao, 1976.
- Sabda Ratnakaram (original: 1885) by Bahujanapalli Sitaramacharyulu (1827–1891). Revised by Nidudavolu Venkatarao. 1969.

== Collaborations ==
- Sakalanitisaaramu, by Madiki Singana. Edited by Nidudavolu Venkatarao and Ponangi Srirama Apparao. 1970.
- Manavalli rachanalu. Edited by Nidudavolu Venkatarao and Ponangi Srirama Apparao. 1972.
- Telugu Kannadamula samskrutika sambandhaalu, by Nidudavolu Venkatarao, et al. 1974.
- Telugu, Kannada, Tamila, Malayala bhashalalo saati samethalu, compiled by Nidudavolu Venkatarao, et al., 1961.

== Titles and awards ==
- "Vidyaratna" awarded by Andhra Saraswata Parishad, Narasaraopet.
- tripurantakodaaharam, edited with elaborate annotations by Venkatarao won Telugu Bhasha Samiti award.
- Kalaprapoorna title, conferred by Andhra University in 1970.
- UGC Professorship from 1964 to 1967

== See also ==
- List of Indian writers
