= Pongal (dish) =

Indian rice dish

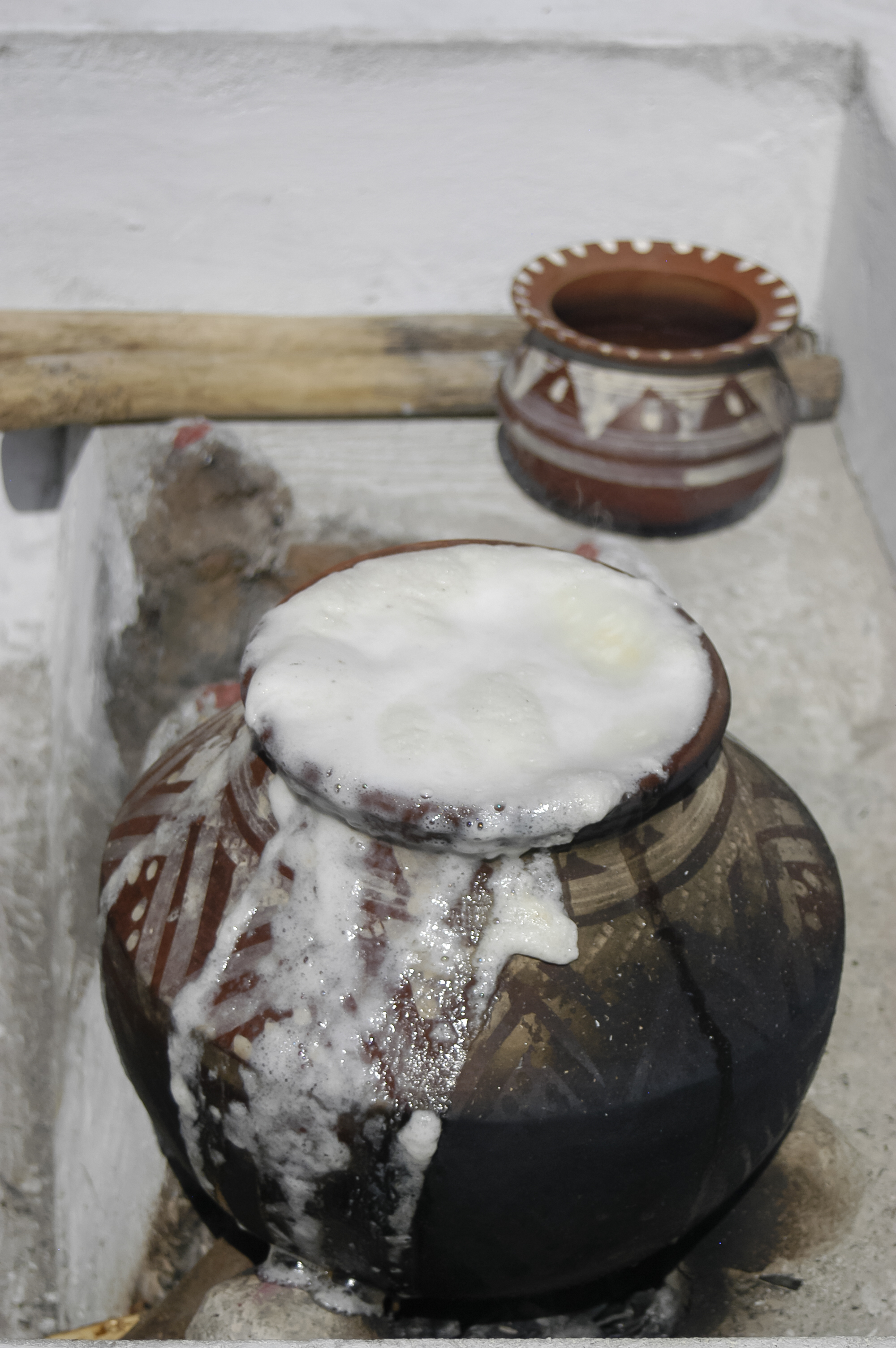
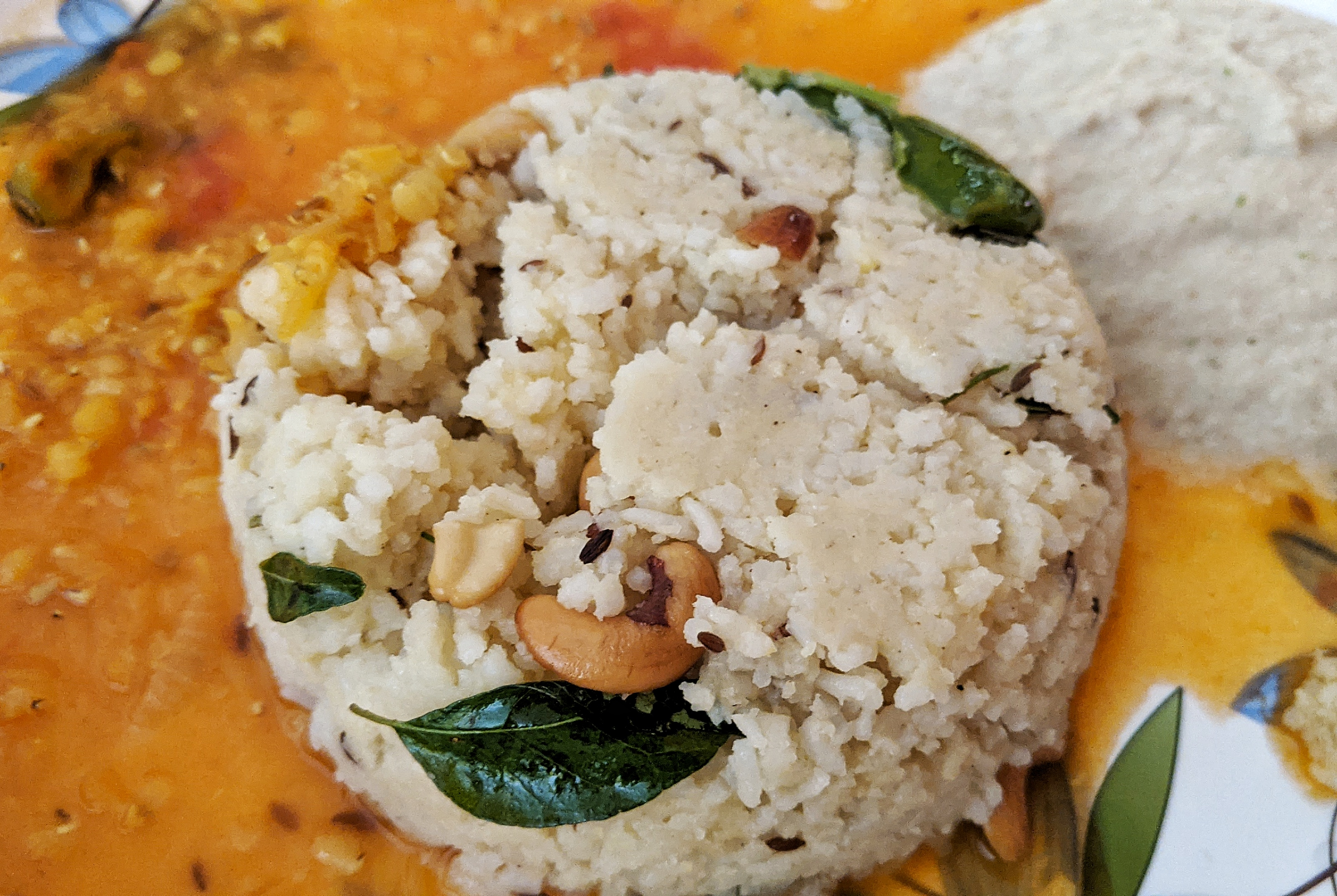
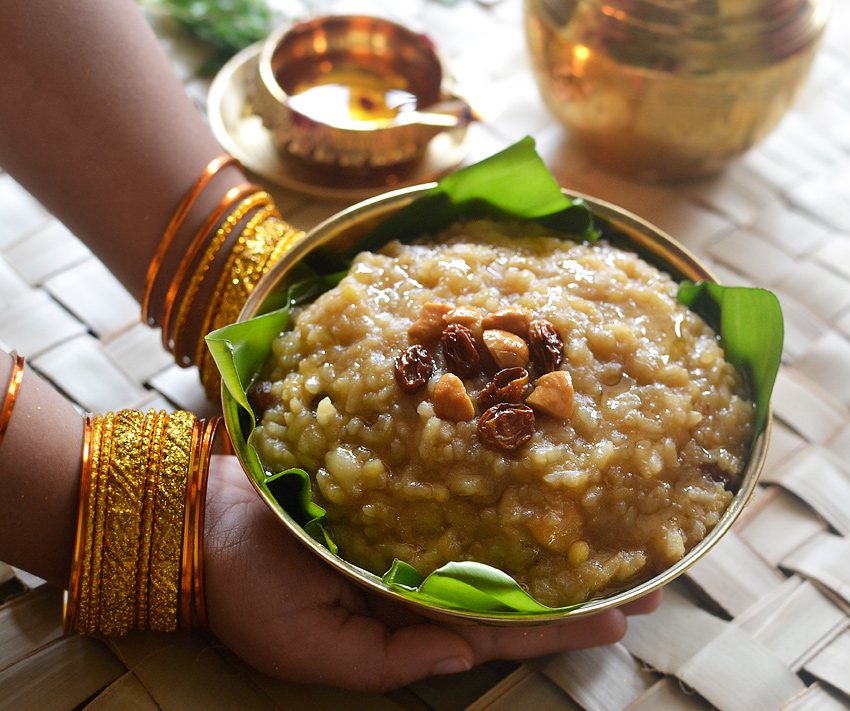
- Cooking pongal in a traditional pot (left); Venn pongal (center); Sakkarai pongal
- Place of origin: India, Sri Lanka
- Region or state: South India
- Associated cuisine: Tamil cuisine
- Main ingredients: Rice, milk
- Variations: Venn pongal; Sakkarai pongal; Kozhi pongal; Sanyasi pongal

Pongal (lit. 'to boil over') is a dish of rice cooked in boiling milk. It is a popular dish cooked by the Tamil people in South India and Sri Lanka. Its preparation is the main custom associated with the namesake Pongal festival. Several varieties such as the Venn pongal and Sakkarai pongal are part of the Tamil cuisine.

== Etymology and significance ==
The dish is associated with the Pongal festival, a major harvest festival of the Tamils. The name literally translates to "boil over" or "overflow" in Tamil language. As per tradition, the fresh harvest of rice is cooked in boiling milk and offered to various Hindu deities. While the pongal is cooking, onlookers shout "Pongalo pongal!" ('Let the pongal rise up!').

== Variations ==
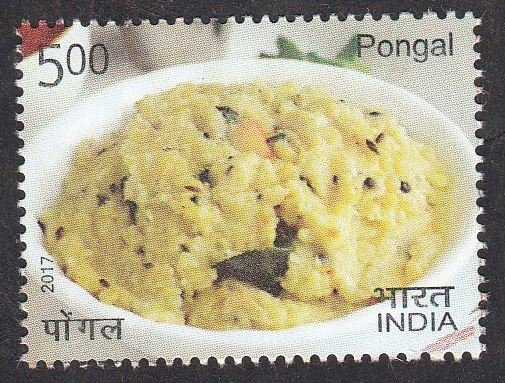
India Post stamp depicting Venn pongal

Typically pongal varieties are made with cow milk and its derivatives. Venn pongal ("Venn" means white) is made up of rice and lentil porridge similar to another South Asian staple khichdi. Spices like black pepper, ginger, turmeric, asafoetida, cashews, cumin, curry leaves, are used along with ghee (clarified butter), mung beans, and salt. In South India, it is commonly eaten for breakfast with coconut chutney and coffee.

Sakkarai pongal ("Sakkarai" meaning sweet or sugar) is made with jaggery, mixed with cardamom, cashews, raisins, nutmeg, and ghee. It is often served as a prasadam after being offered to the deities. Other variations include Kozhi pongal ("Kozhi" meaning chicken) made with chicken meat and Sanyasi pongal ("Sanyasi" meaning ascetic or monk) made with vegetables.
