= Panama Pasama =

1968 film by K. S. Gopalakrishnan

- Theatrical release poster
- Directed by: K. S. Gopalakrishnan
- Screenplay by: K. S. Gopalakrishnan
- Story by: G. Balasubramaniam
- Produced by: Balu
- Starring: Gemini Ganesan; B. Saroja Devi
- Cinematography: R. Sampath
- Edited by: R. Devarajan
- Music by: K. V. Mahadevan
- Production company: Ravi Productions
- Release date: 23 February 1968
- Running time: 162 minutes
- Country: India
- Language: Tamil

Panama Pasama (transl. Money or Affection?) is a 1968 Indian Tamil-language drama film, directed and written by K. S. Gopalakrishnan. The film stars Gemini Ganesan and B. Saroja Devi. It was released on 23 February 1968, and had a theatrical run of over 140 days. The film was remade the following year in Hindi as Paisa Ya Pyaar.

== Plot ==
A wealthy, prestige-obsessed woman's children choose love over social status.

== Cast ==
Lead actors

- Gemini Ganesan as Shankar
- B. Saroja Devi as Shanthi
- Nagesh as Deva

Male supporting actors

- T. K. Bhagavathi as Nagalingam
- Sivakumar as Shankar's brother in law
- C. R. Parthiban
- K. Sarangapani as Kannamma's stepfather
- V. S. Raghavan as Shankar's father
- K. Kannan as Jambu
- Samikkannu as Mesthri

Female supporting actors

- S. Varalakshmi as Meenakshi
- Vijaya Nirmala as Kannamma aka Baby
- Sundari Bai
- Pushpalatha as Shankar's sister
- G. Sakunthala
- Radhabhai

== Production ==
Srividya was initially chosen for the role which was portrayed by Vijaya Nirmala. Sivakumar was cast in a major role, although the majority of his scenes did not make the final cut.

== Soundtrack ==
The music was composed by K. V. Mahadevan, while the lyrics were written by Kannadasan. The song "Yelantha Pazham" became controversial due to its perceived erotic or vulgar lyrics, but became popular among the masses. The song "Vaazhaith thandu Pola" refers to vazhaithandu, a banana stem used in curries in South India.

Song	Singers	Length
"Chinnanchiru Veedu"	P. Susheela	3:32
"Maariyadhu Nenjam"	P. Susheela	4:15
"Mella Mella"	T. M. Soundararajan, P. Susheela	4:18
"Vaazhaith thandu Pola"	K. Jamuna Rani, A. L. Raghavan	3:01
"Yelantha Pazham"	L. R. Eswari	3:20

== Release and reception ==
Panama Pasama was released on 23 February 1968. Kalki negatively reviewed the film, criticising Gopalakrishnan's dialogues and direction. Ananda Vikatan said that though the concept was old, the way it was handled was innovative. The critic concluded that the film had few flaws, and was another testament to Gopalakrishnan's talent. The film became Gopalakrishnan's biggest success to that point; it ran for 140 days at Madurai's Thangam Theatre, then the largest theatre in Asia.
