= Poriyal =

Tamil stir-fry

Poṟiyal
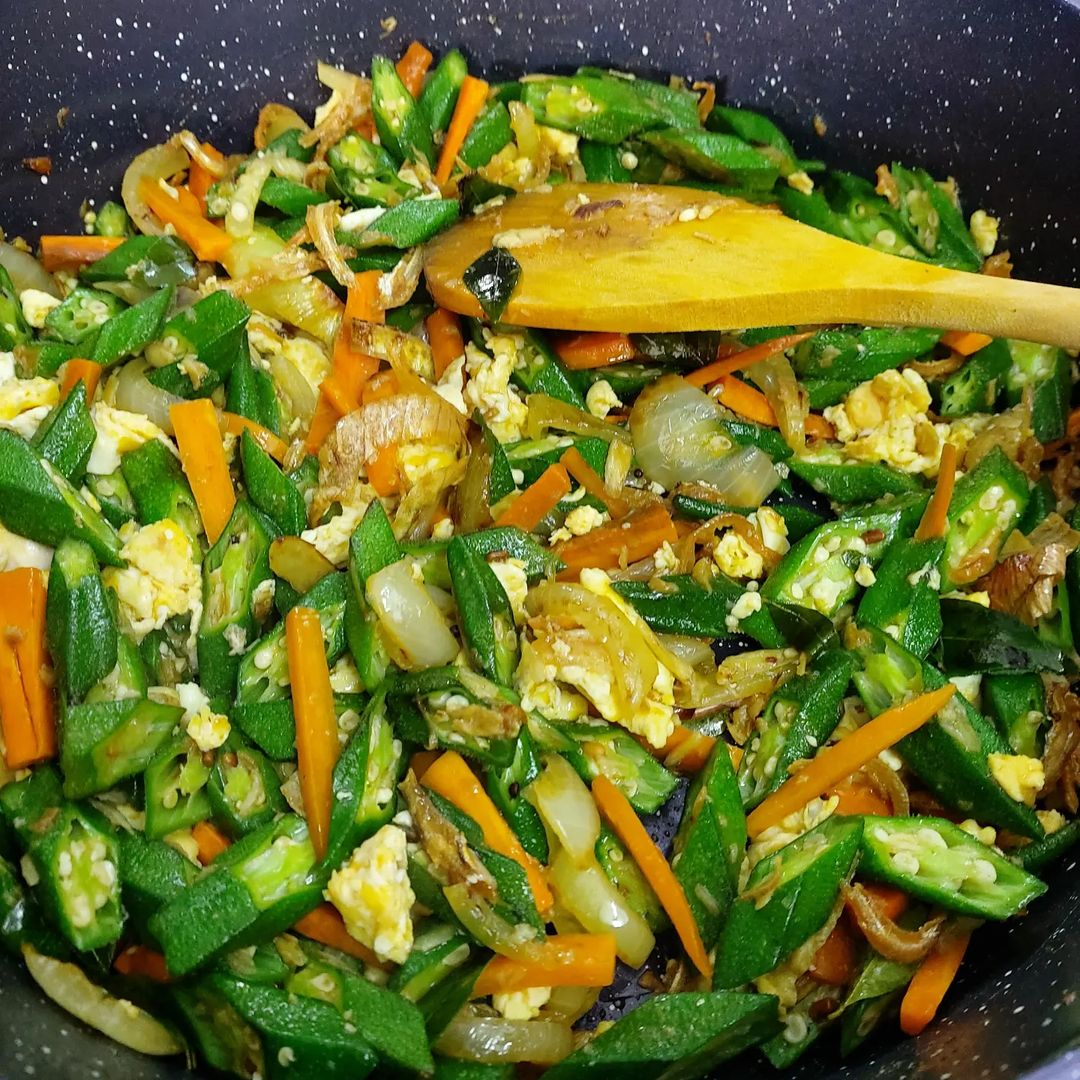
- Poriyal is south Indian stir-fried or sauteed vegetables and greens.
- Type: Stir fry
- Place of origin: India
- Region or state: Indian subcontinent
- Main ingredients: Vegetables, spices

Poṟiyal or porial (Tamil: பொரியல்) is a Tamil word for any fried, or sometimes sautéed, vegetable dish. It is called palya in Kannada, vepudu in Telugu, and mezhukupuratti in Malayalam. It is usually made by shallow frying shredded or diced vegetables and greens along with spices. The preparation would normally involve frying mustard seeds, urad dal, onions and then the main vegetable, and finally adding turmeric, various spices, dried red chillies, and coriander.

In Tamil Nadu, shredded coconut would be added as a dressing. All poṟiyals by default have some vegetables and lentils or greens, but many variations of the main vegetable exist. Poṟiyal serves as a side dish to a three-course meal of rice with sambhar, rasam and yogurt (curd in Indian English). Poriyal is also commonly eaten with chapati.

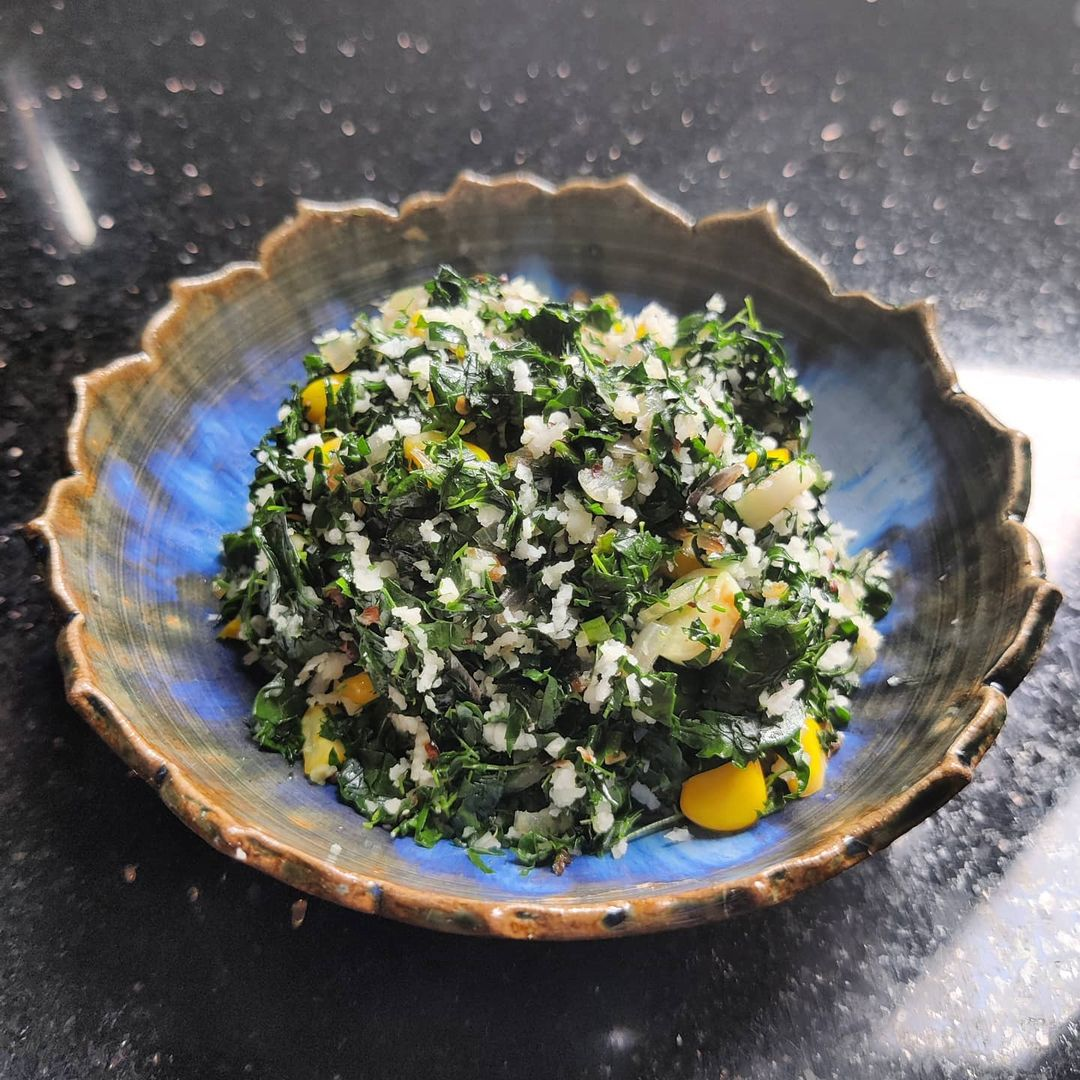
'Murungakai Keerai Poriyal' is moringa leaves poriyal.

Many other regional variations exist. Palya, a very common dish in the South Indian state of Karnataka is very similar to the poṟiyal. Some variations of the palya involve use of chana dal instead of urad dal. Porutu in Andhra region is prepared in almost same manner, but the name has become alternate to Guddu porutu, egg poṟiyal.

== Etymology ==
The word poriyal refers to the cooking or preparation process involved in preparing the dish. The verb pori refers to stir frying, i.e., cooking in hot wok with a small amount of hot oil. The word Pori as a noun refers to puffed rice or popcorn, which is prepared in a similar manner.

Other Tamil words that refer to a dish based its cooking process are:

- Aviyal - Boil
- Kadaiyal - Grind / Mash of boiled lentils with water
- Masiyal - Mash of boiled roots and leafy greens
- Thuvaiyal - Coarse Mash of stirfried vegetables
- Varuval - Deep Fry
- Vathakkal - Shallow Fry
- Vatral - Drying (in the Sun)
