= Sabda Ratnakaram =

Telugu language dictionary

Sabda Ratnakaramu
- Author: Bahujanapalli Sitaramacharyulu
- Language: Telugu
- Subject: Dictionary
- Publication date: 1885
- Publication place: India

Sabda Ratnakaramu (శబ్దరత్నాకరము) is a Telugu language dictionary written by Bahujanapalli Sitaramacharyulu and published in 1885. It contains nearly 34,000 entries. It is among the most influential dictionaries in Telugu language. It was published under the direction of Madras School Book and Vernacular Literature Society. The dictionary was reprinted more than 10 times.

The words in the dictionary are followed by a symbol indicating the source language as well as the part of speech. The entries include 123 English loanwords, 16 Tamil loanwords and 4 Kannada loanwords. Meanings are numbered and homonyms are separated. The 6th edition of Sabda Ratnakaramu was revised by N. Venkata Rao who added an Appendix of 116 pages containing 3,115 new loanwords.
