= Sambar (dish) =

Lentil stew

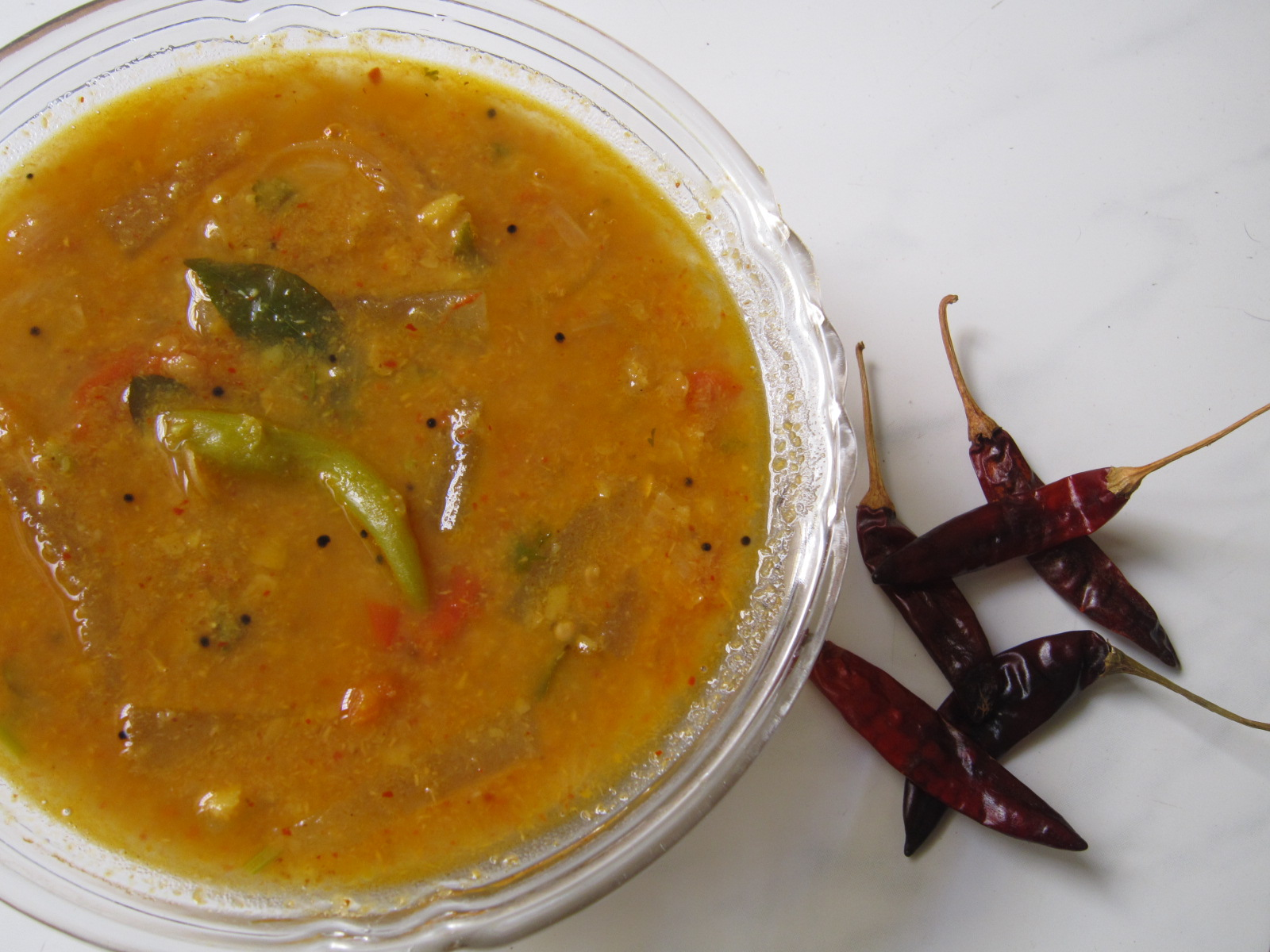
- Type: Spiced vegetarian curry
- Place of origin: India
- Region or state: South India
- Serving temperature: Hot
- Main ingredients: Tamarind broth, lentils, vegetables

Sāmbār, or sambhar, is a lentil-based vegetable spiced curry or stew, cooked with pigeon peas and tamarind broth. It originates in South Indian cuisine and is also eaten in other parts of India.

== History ==
The recorded history of sambar is vague.

Verse 2.98 of Amuktamalyada (c. 1517), a Telugu poem by the Vijayanagara king Krishnadevaraya, mentions the word "sambarampuchintapandu". According to a 2010 translation by Srinivas Sistla of Andhra University, the poem mentions "Sambar ingredients packed in separate packs, jaggery, tamarind paste" while describing the food that Periyalvar's wife packs at Srivilliputhur in present-day Tamil Nadu. Bahujanapalli Sitaramacharyulu's dictionary Sabdaratnakaramu (1885) and Vedam Venkataraya Sastry's commentary (1927) on the poem also interpret the word in the same way. Therefore, Sistla theorizes that sambar must have been an integral part of the Tamil cuisine by the 16th century.

According to food historian K. T. Achaya (1994), the earliest extant reference to sambar, as "huli", can be dated to the 17th century in present-day Karnataka. Kanthirava Narasaraja Vijaya, a 1648 text by the Kannada scholar Govinda Vaidya, mentions huli (puli) (literally "sourness"), a curry similar to the modern sambar, made with vegetables and toor dal.

According to a legend, sambar was first made in the Thanjavur Maratha kingdom during the reign of Shahuji I (r. 1684–1712). The legend states that during a visit by Sambhaji, a king or his royal chef substituted kokum with tamarind in the traditional amti (lentil soup), and added some vegetables to it: the resulting curry was named sambar or sambhar after Sambhaji. Sourish Bhattacharyya, in The Bloomsbury Handbook of Indian Cuisine (2023), notes that the fathers of Shahuji I and Sambhaji were half-brothers and not on good terms, which reduces the credibility of this legend. However, Bhattacharyya adds that it is possible that Shahuji named the dish after Sambhaji as part of his attempts to establish cordial relations between the two families.

== Regional variations ==
Sambar can vary in the levels of spiciness depending on the preferences of the people eating it, as well as regional variations. It is commonly eaten with dosas or idlis. Oftentimes, it is mixed-in with rice and eaten alongside crunchy foods like murukku or even potato chips. It is a staple of Tamil Nadu cuisine.

In southern states of India, namely Karnataka, Andhra Pradesh, Telangana, Kerala and Tamil Nadu, sambar is made using different vegetables along with lentils or coconut. Each region has its own version of making sambar; even though the same vegetables are used, the condiments and ingredients, as well as the methods, differ. In Tulu-speaking areas of coastal Karnataka, coconut is predominantly used to prepare koddel (sambar). Grated coconut is ground with spices to form a paste which is added to boiled vegetables. In Kannada-speaking areas it is called Saaru.

== See also ==
- Kuzhambu
- Cuisine of Andhra Pradesh
- Cuisine of Tamil Nadu
- Cuisine of Maharashtra
- Cuisine of Karnataka
- Kerala cuisine
- Udupi cuisine
- South Indian cuisine
