= Kuzhambu =

Tamil vegetable side dish

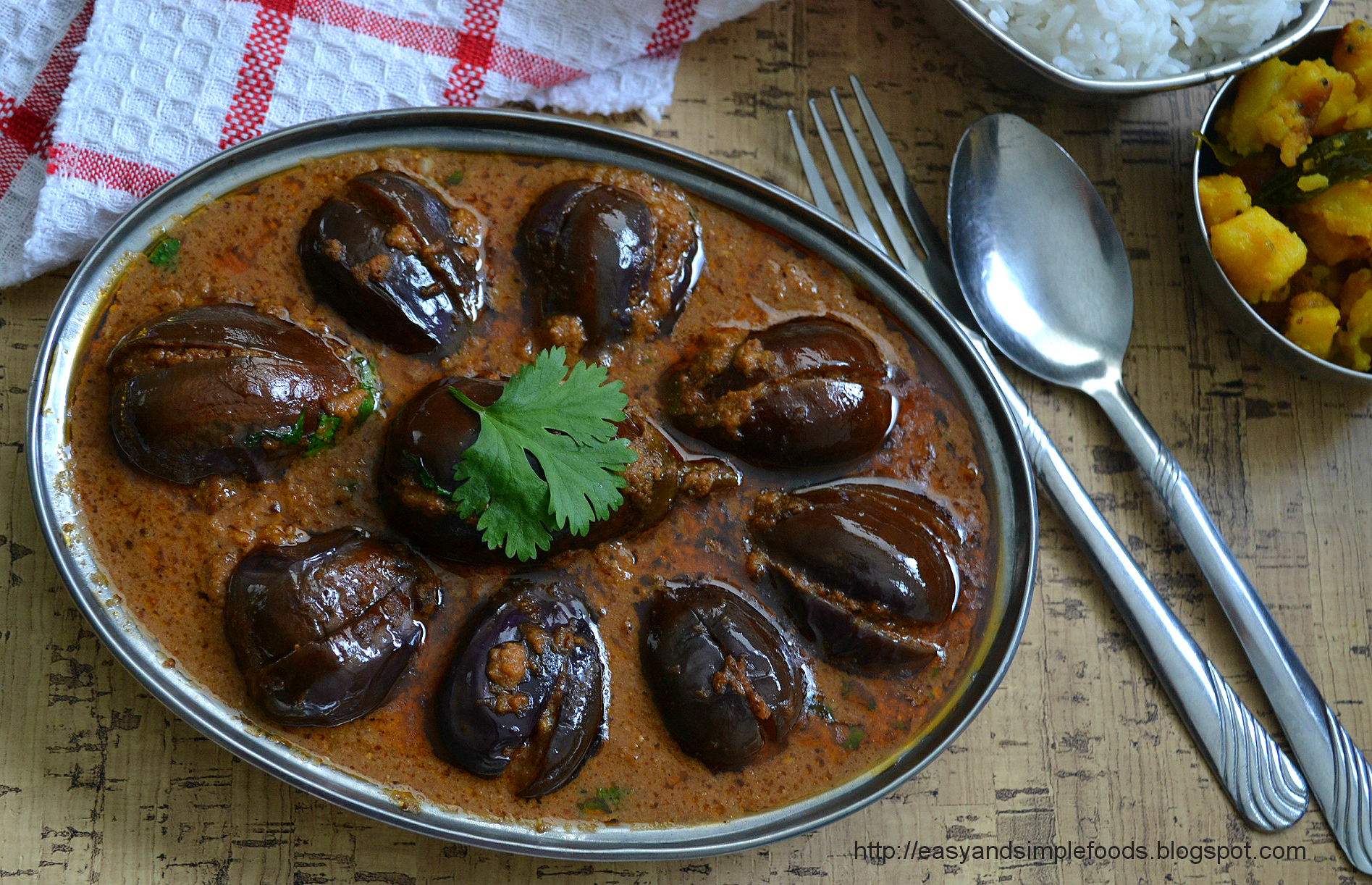
- Ennai kathirikkai kuzhambu (Stuffed eggplant kuzhambu)
- Place of origin: Tamil Nadu, India
- Region or state: South India and Sri Lanka
- Created by: /
- Main ingredients: tamarind, vegetables

Kuḻambu (Tamil: குழம்பு, IPA: [kuɻɐmbɯ]), is a tamarind-based curry in Tamil cuisine popular in Tamil Nadu and Sri Lanka that can include a variety of meat, vegetables, and in some cases, dal.

Kuḻambu is based on a broth made with tamarind, a blend of spices that include ground coriander seeds, fenugreek, and toor dal, and can include fresh or dried vegetables, blended fresh coconut, or dried lentil balls (vadagam, Tamil: வடகம்). It can be made watery like a broth or thick like a gravy. The dish is very popular as a side dish for rice in the northern regions of Sri Lanka and the southern regions of India, especially in Tamil Nadu, Karnataka, and Kerala. In Telangana and Andhra Pradesh, Kuḻambu is called Pulusu (పులుసు). In Karnataka, it is called Saaru. The number of varieties of Kuḻambu are countless, with each region and community of Tamil Nadu preparing it with a typical variation, adapted to its taste and environment.

It is a common misconception that lentils (dal) are a staple ingredient in Kuḻambu. There are varieties of Kuḻambu, such as paruppu (Tamil: பருப்பு, meaning dal) Kuḻambu and pattani Kuḻambu that contain lentils, but the vast majority do not use dal beyond the small quantity used as a spice or during tempering.

== Preparation ==
The preparation of Kuḻambu vary greatly with the type of Kuḻambu to be made, but its basic preparation methods include first tempering curry leaves, whole black mustard seeds, whole cumin seeds, dry red chili pepper, and often split urad dal over vegetable oil on a heated stove. For Kuḻambu that includes vegetables, they are cut and then added to the fry, with shallots, and garlic being added first, and pureed or diced tomatoes going last. Salt and ground spices are added next (which are often pre-prepared), and finally tamarind juice (tamarind soaked in water), or tamarind concentrate and water. For meat or fish Kuḻambu vegetables are sauteed as described above, the meat or fish is then added and allowed to mix with the sauteed vegetables. Then a broth made of ground coconut, water and masala is added last. Meat Kuḻambu is usually thicker. The dish is then cooked for approximately 20 minutes and usually served with rice.

== Varieties ==
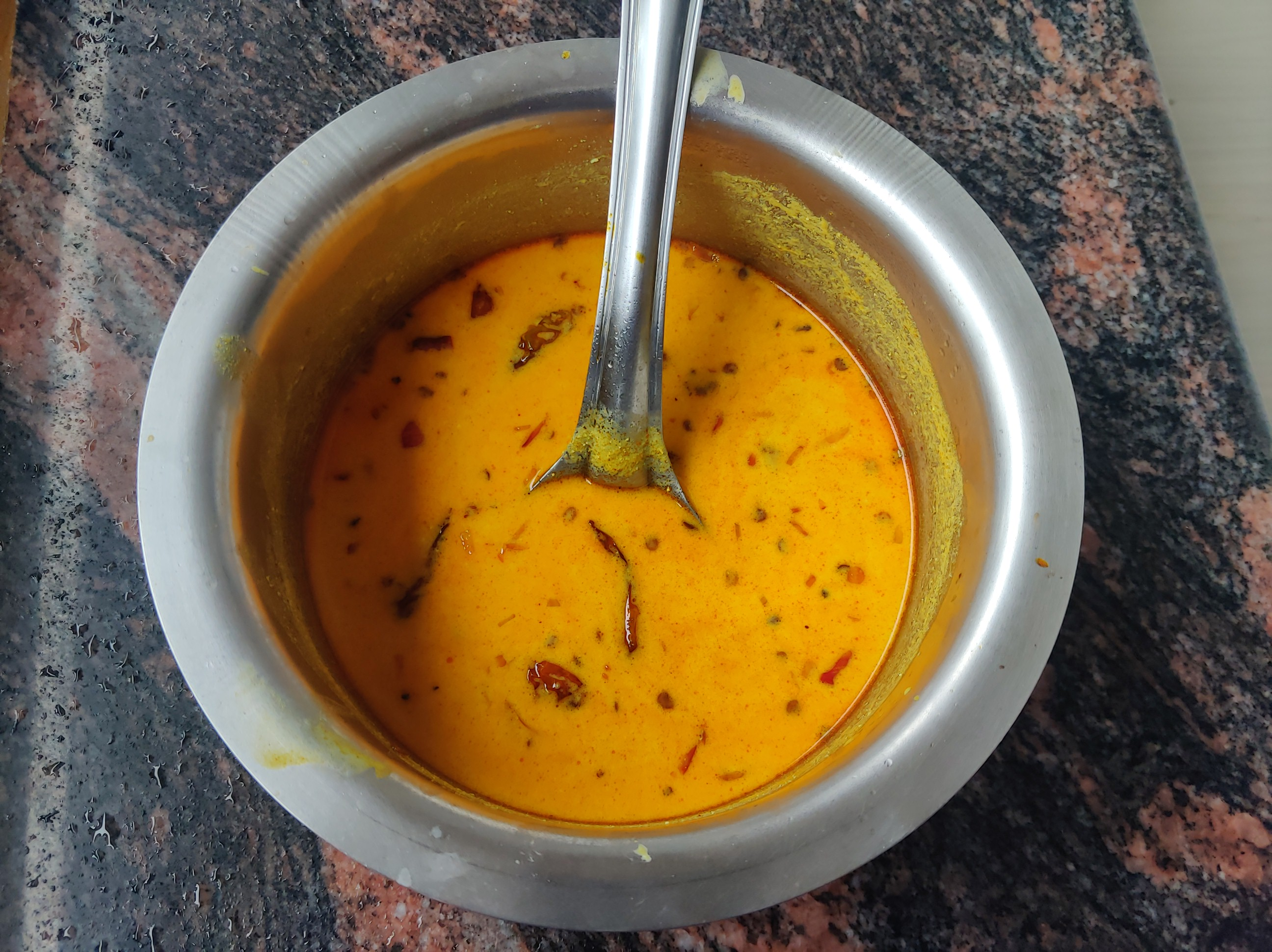
Mor Kuzhambu aka Buttermilk curry

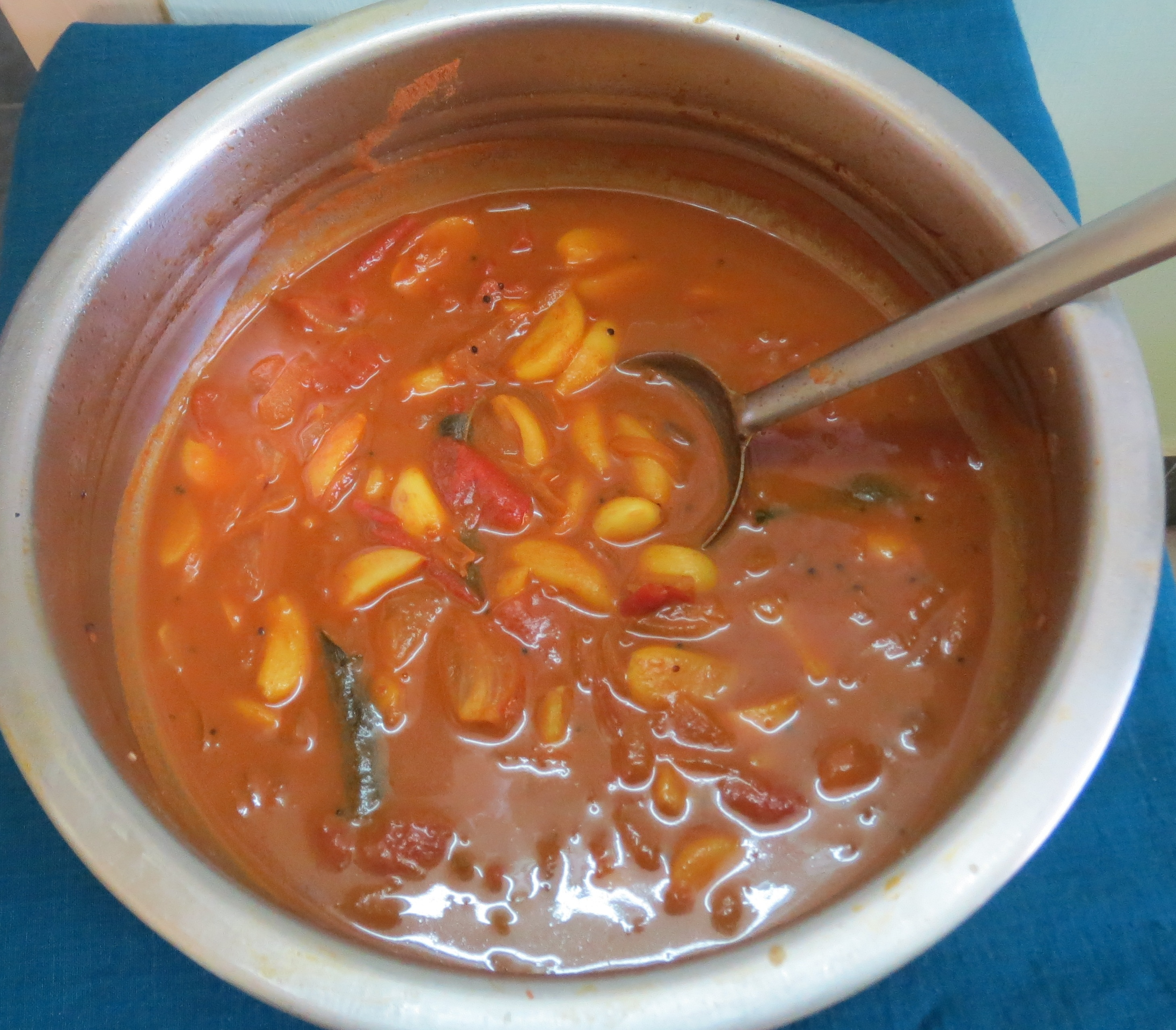
Poondu Kuzhambu

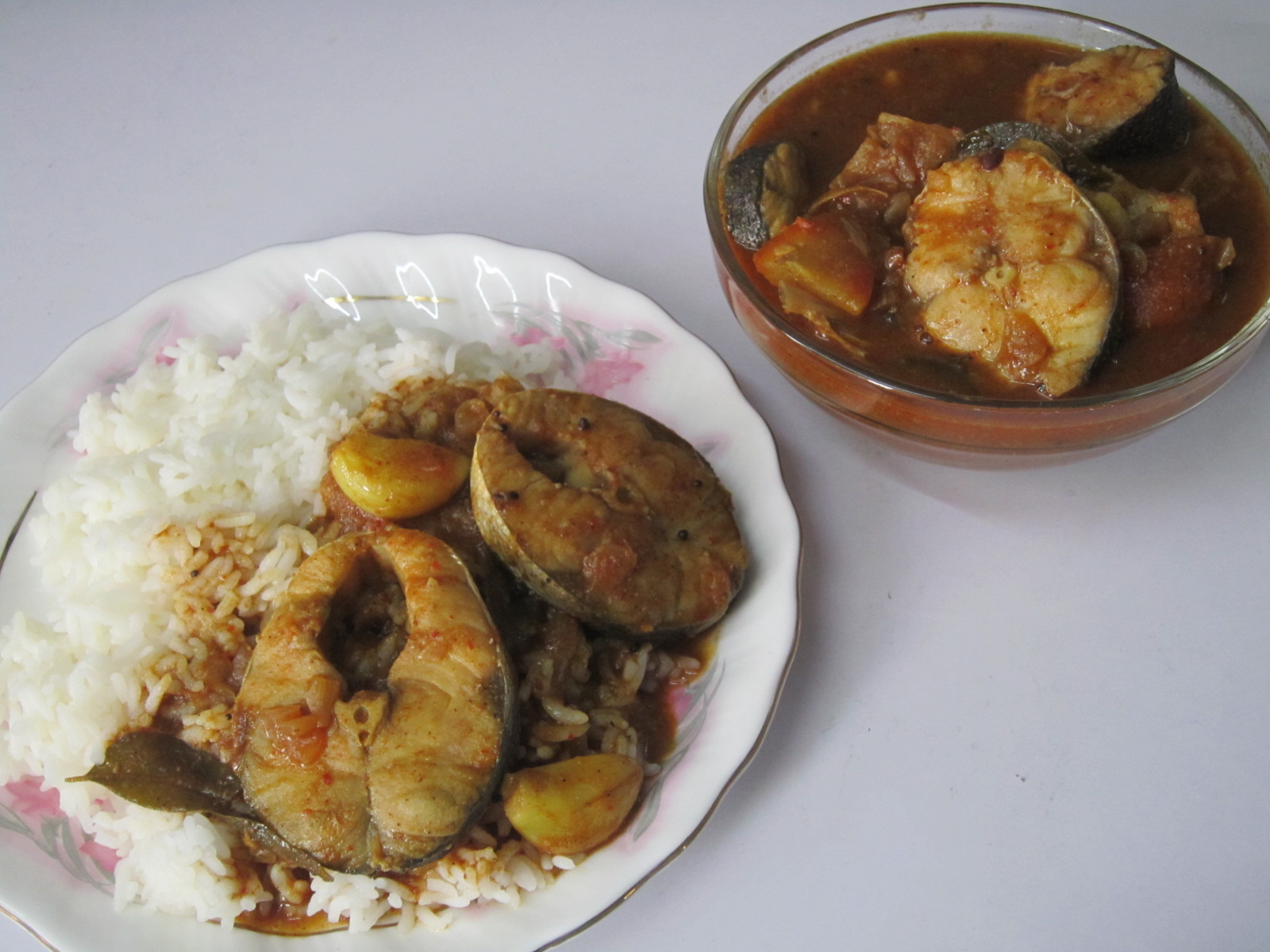
Meen Kuḻambu

The following is a small list of the hundreds of varieties of Kuḻambu popular in Tamil cuisine. These types of Kuḻambu all include a base of tamarind, urad and toor dals, and spices such as curry leaves, chili, and salt. Many of these varieties also include tomatoes or tomato juice as part of the base.

Varieties of Kuḻambu
Name	Distinguishing Ingredient(s)
Vathal Kuḻambu	turkey berry, shallots
Milagu Kuḻambu	black pepper
Kara Kuḻambu	onion, green chili, tomatoes
Mor Kuḻambu	thick buttermilk, channa dal, ash gourd, okra, pumpkin
Poondu Kuḻambu	garlic
Kathirikkai Kulambu	Eggplant
Vazhakai Kuḻambu	plantain
Vendakai Kuḻambu	okra
Poricha Kuḻambu	mixed vegetables, black pepper, ample amounts of dal
Thakkali Kuḻambu	more than usual proportions of Tomato puree
Muttai Kuḻambu	Egg
Meen Kuḻambu	Fish
Kozhi Kuḻambu	Chicken

== See also ==
- Cuisine of Tamil Nadu
- Cuisine of Karnataka
- Cuisine of Kerala
- Cuisine of Martinique
- South Indian cuisine
