= Kanji (disambiguation) =

Kanji (Japanese: 漢字) is a Japanese writing system that borrowed Chinese characters.

Kanji may also refer to:

== People ==
- Cangjie, a legendary Chinese historiographer
- Ricardo Kanji (1948–2025), Brazilian flutist
- Kanji Swami, a teacher of Jainism
- Kanji Bhai Rathod, Indian filmmaker
- Kanji Bhai Patel, Indian politician
- Kanji Bhai Talpada, Indian politician
- Kanji (wrestler), English professional wrestler

== Places ==
- Kanji, Jammu and Kashmir, a village in the Leh district in north India
- Kanji, Tamil Nadu, a village in Tiruvannamalai District in south India

== Other ==
- Kanji (given name), a masculine Japanese given name
- Cangjie input method (cj), a method of computer entry of Chinese characters
- Congee or kanji, a semi-liquid food made from rice
- Kanji (drink), an Indian drink prepared for the Holi festival
- Kanji (era), a Japanese era name (1087–1094)
- Kanji (food), a rice water based dish traditionally prepared in Odisha
- Kanji bush, the common name of the Australian shrub Acacia inaequilatera
- Kanjibhai vs God, working title of the 2012 Indian comedy film OMG – Oh My God!

== See also ==
- Kanzi, a bonobo ape
- Kanzi (apple)
