= Kranji (disambiguation) =

Kranji is a suburb in northwestern Singapore.

Kranji may also refer to:

- Kranji Bus Depot, a bus depot at Kranji Road in Kranji, Singapore
- Kranji drombus, one of ten species of goby
- Kranji Expressway, an Expressway in Singapore
- Kranji Marshes, a nature reserve in the northwest area of Singapore
- Kranji Mile, a thoroughbred horse race at Singapore Turf Club
- Kranji Racecourse, a venue for thoroughbred horse racing
- Kranji Reservoir, a reservoir in the northern part of Singapore
- Kranji Reservoir Park, a 9 hectares park
- Kranji Secondary School
- Kranji State Cemetery, a national cemetery of Singapore
- Kranji War Cemetery, the cemetery in Kranji, Singapore
- Kranji War Memorial, the memorial at 9 Woodlands Road, in Kranji, Singapore
- Battle of Kranji, the second stage of the Empire of Japan's plan for the invasion of Singapore

== See also ==
- Kranji Station (disambiguation)
- Kanji (disambiguation)
