= Pulihora =

Traditional rice dish in southern India

Puliyodharai
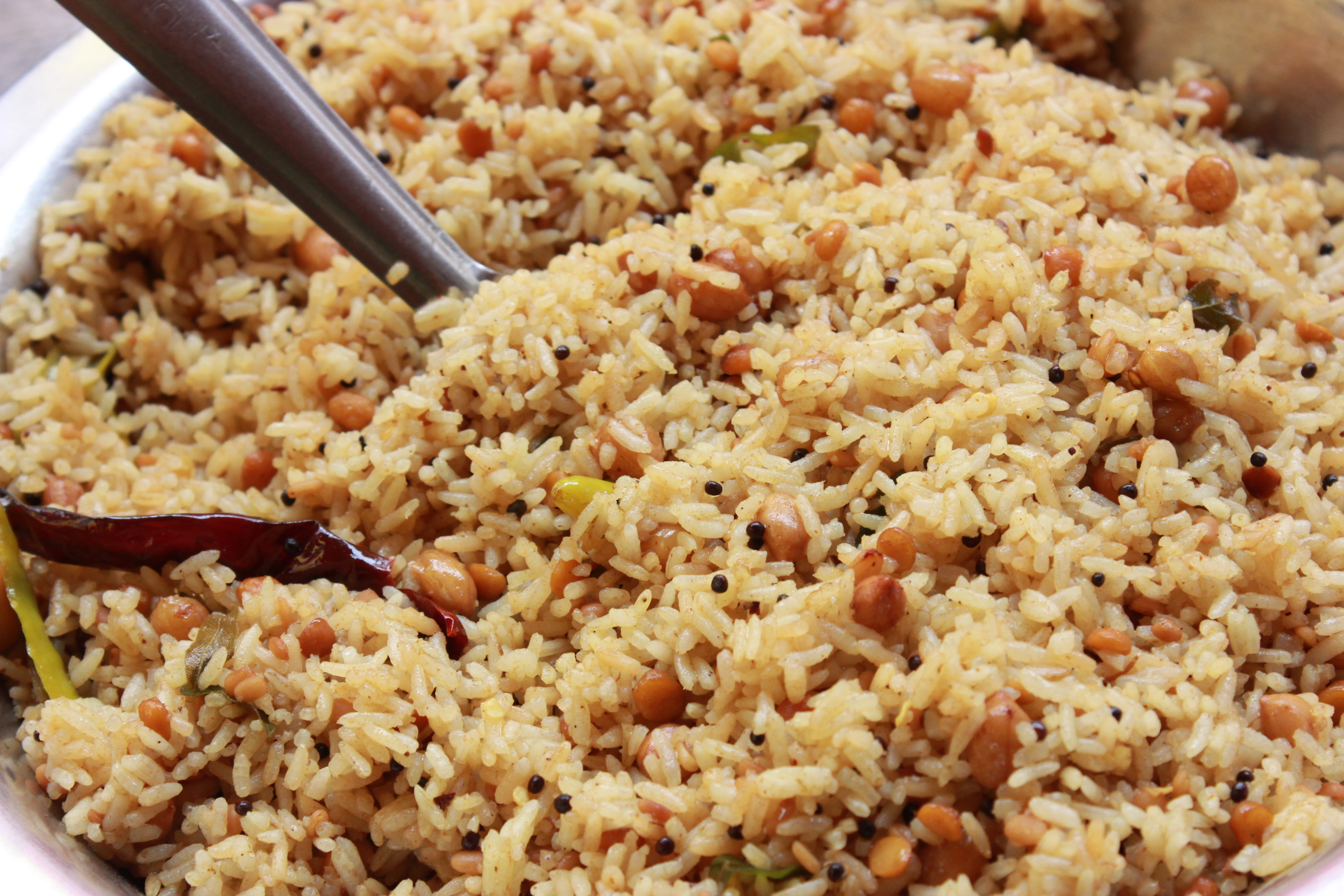
- Place of origin: India
- Region or state: Tamil
- Main ingredients: Rice, Kokum, Citron or Tamarind
- Variations: Kokum, Citron, Ambula (dried green mango), tamarind, lemon, lime, citron, onion

Pulihora, also known as Pulisoru, Pulinchoru, Puliyogare, Puliyodarai, Ambad Baath, Kokum rice, or simply Tamarind rice, is a common and traditional rice preparation in the South Indian states of Andhra Pradesh, Telangana, Tamil Nadu and Karnataka. Puli means 'tangy' or 'sour' in South Indian languages, referring to the characterizing use of kokum or tamarind as one of the main ingredients.

== History ==
According to historian Dr. G. Deivanayagam recipe for Pulihora finds mentioned in the inscription of Thanjavur temple kitchens dating back to 1010 CE.

== Preparation ==
The pulihora is prepared with kokum, tamarind, lemon or green mango as main souring ingredient, along with a blend of spices, lentils, peanuts and jaggery cooked in oil and mixed with cooked rice along with fried curry leaves and turmeric.

Pulihora gojju (paste) or Pulihora podi (powder) is often pre-made at homes in southern India and stored for months. It is mixed with cooked rice in a pan to make pulihora instantly.

Pulihora is usually cooked on special occasions and festive days. It is presented to God as part of prayers known as prasadam in most of the South Indian temples as well as South Indian homes.

== See also ==
- Chitranna (lemon rice)
