= Naruse Kanji =

Japanese Martial Artist (1888–1948)

- Born: November 10, 1888; Gifu Pref., Japan
- Died: September 30, 1948 (aged 59); Tokyo, Japan
- Style: Negishi Ryu Shurikenjutsu, Kuwana Han-den Yamamoto Ryu Iai-jutsu
- Teachers: Tonegawa Magoroku; Naruse Zenta Masashizu

Other information
- Notable students: Saito Satoshi

Naruse Kanji (成瀬 関次, November 10, 1888 – September 30, 1948) was a prominent Japanese swordsman, author, researcher and master of classical Japanese shurikenjutsu. He authored Japan’s first-ever guide to shurikenjutsu in 1943, which is revered as the cornerstone to modern-day knowledge and methodology. His profound insights into the construction and maintenance of Showa-period Japanese swords lead to the publishing of his "Practical Sword Trilogy," which documented his findings as a military blade smith & cutler during the Second Sino-Japanese War.

Naruse was the 14th generation headmaster of Yamamoto Ryu Iaijutsu, inherited from his father-in-law, Naruse Zenta Masashizu. He was also the 3rd generation headmaster of Negishi Ryu Shurikenjutsu, inherited from Tonegawa Magoroku. During his lifetime, Naruse Kanji also managed to revive elements of the Shirai Ryu Shurikenjutsu tradition, which were passed on to him via Miyawaki Toru. Active membership in the Nihon Kobudo Shinkokai (Japan Classical Martial Arts Promotion Society) resulted in a friendship with Fujita Seiko, who later went on to write his own groundbreaking guide to shurikenjutsu, drawing heavily from the teachings and research of Naruse.

Before his death from natural causes in September of 1948, the lineages for Negishi Ryu Shurikenjutsu and Yamamoto Ryu Iaijutsu were formally bequeathed to Saito Satoshi. Meanwhile, Shirakami Eizo (also known as Ikkuken) inherited the revived teachings of Shirai Ryu Shurikenjutsu.

== Selected works ==
Naruse's "Practical Sword Trilogy" is considered a seminal work for those interested in the functional reality of the Japanese sword:

1. Jissen Tōdan (実戦刀譚, 1941) – Discussions on Practical Swords
2. Tatakau Nihontō (戦ふ日本刀, 1942) – The Fighting Japanese Sword
3. Zuihitsu Nihontō (随筆日本刀, 1942) – Essays on the Japanese Sword

He also authored works on martial arts, including Shuriken (1943) and Rinsen Tōjutsu (1944, Battlefield Swordsmanship).
