= Acacia clementii =

Acacia clementii may refer to:

- Acacia pyrifolia (Acacia clementii Domin)
- Acacia xiphophylla (Acacia clementii Maiden & Blakely)
