= Rasam (dish) =

Soup-like dish from South India

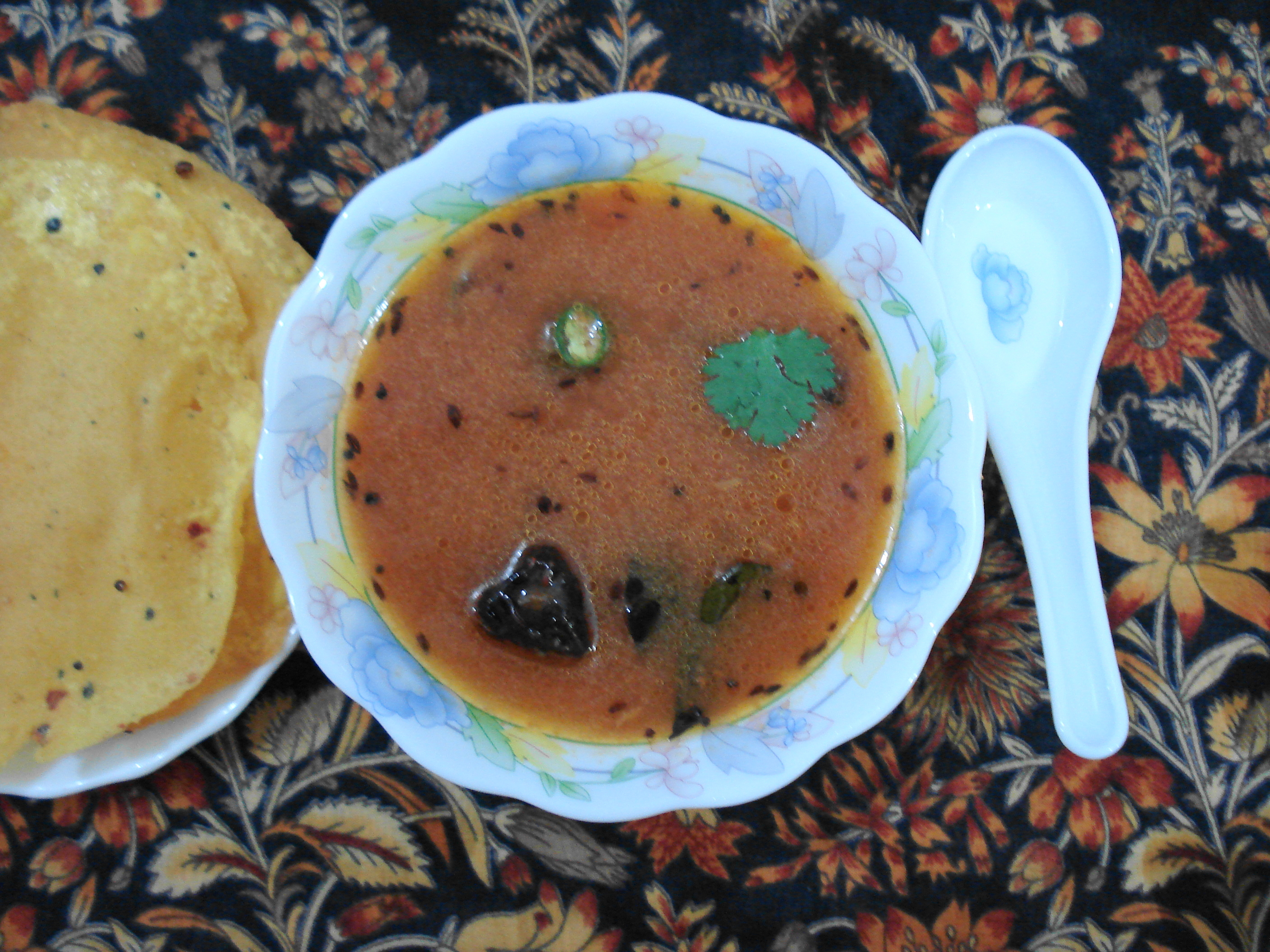
- Alternative names: Thili saaru, saatramudhu, chaaru, chaatambde
- Place of origin: India
- Region or state: Tamil Nadu, Andhra Pradesh, Karnataka, Kerala, Maharashtra, Telangana, Odisha
- Serving temperature: Hot
- Main ingredients: kokum, kadam, jaggery, tamarind, tomato, lentil

Rasam, (Tamil: ரசம்) Thili saaru (Kannada), chaaru (Telugu), chaatambde or saatramudhu (Tamil: சாற்றமுது) is a spicy South Indian soup-like dish. It is usually served as a side dish with rice. In a traditional South Indian meal, it is part of a course that includes sambar rice. Rasam has a distinct taste in comparison to sambar due to its own seasoning ingredients and is watery in consistency. Chilled prepared versions are marketed commercially as well as rasam paste in bottles.

An Anglo-Indian variety of rasam is the soup-like dish mulligatawny whose name is derived from the Tamil word milagu thanni.

== Origin ==
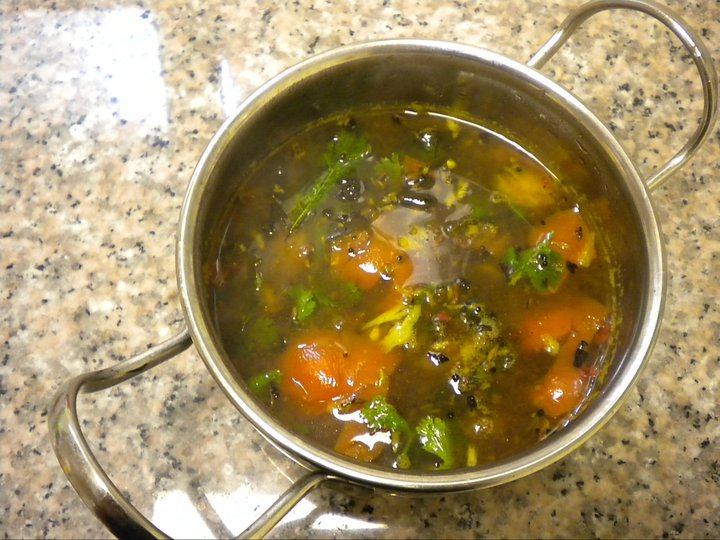
Rasam with various garnishes

Rasam in Tamil and Malayalam, Thili sāru in Kannada (Kannada script: ತಿಳಿ ಸಾರು), Thili means watery, Saaru means curry/stew, chāru (చారు) in Telugu means "essence" and, by extension, "juice" or "soup". In South Indian households rasam commonly refers to a soupy dish prepared with a sweet-sour stock made from either kokum or tamarind, along with tomato and lentil, added spices and garnish.

The name rasam is derived from Sanskrit रस; transliterated: rása, meaning sap, juice, or essence. The Sanskrit word also yielded the English word rasa, in the aesthetic sense.

== Ingredients ==
Rasam is prepared mainly with a tart base such as kokum, malabar tamarind (kudam puli), tamarind, vate huli (vate huli powder), ambula or amchur (dried green mango) stock depending on the region. A dal or lentil stock (for rasam, the typical dal used is split yellow pigeon peas or mung beans) is optional but is used in several rasam recipes. Jaggery, cumin, black pepper, turmeric, tomato, lemon, mustard seeds, chilli powder, curry leaves, garlic, shallots and coriander leaves may be used as flavoring ingredients and garnish in South India.

== Types ==
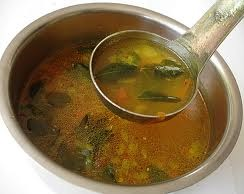
Rasam

Different kinds of rasam are listed below with their main ingredients.

- Baellae sāru – pigeon pea lentil
- Bassāru/kattu sāru – boiled vegetables/greens/lentils
- Beetroot rasam
- Black pepper sāru – black pepper (karimenasu in Kannada)
- Elumichai rasam – lemon juice
- Hesaru kālu sāru – green gram
- Huruli sāru - made from horsegram (kudu in Tulu)
- Inji rasam – ginger
- Jīraga rasam – cumin
- Kandathippili rasam – greens
- Kattu sāru – Togari bele and Byadgi chillies
- Kaḍalai rasam – black chickpeas
- Kattina sāru – jaggery
- Killu Milagai saatramudhu - dry red chilli
- Koẕi rasam – chicken
- Mudakathān rasam – balloon vine
- Māngā rasam – raw or semi-ripe mango
- Murungai pū rasam – drumstick flower
- Miḷagu rasam (mulligatawny) – black pepper
- Mysore rasam – fried lentils
- Nellikkāi rasam – Indian gooseberry
- Panasa tona charu - jackfruit (ripe)
- Puḷi rasam – kokum or tamarind extract
- Paruppu rasam/pappu sāru – pulses and tomato stock
- Pūndu rasam – garlic
- Tili sāru – sieving water from plain rice
- Thakkāḷi rasam – tomato puree
- Vēpam pū rasam – neem flower
- Venkāya rasam – eggplant

== See also ==
- List of soups
