= Kanji (given name) =

- Gender: Male

Origin
- Origin: Japanese
- Meaning: Different meanings depending on the kanji used

Kanji (written: 幹二, 寛治, 莞爾 完治, 完次, 皖司, 侃志 or 勘司) is a masculine Japanese given name. Notable people with the name include:

- Kanji Akagi (赤木 完次; born 1933), Japanese sprinter
- Kanji Asanuma (浅沼 寛治; born 1934), Japanese water polo player
- Kanji Furutachi (古舘 寛治; born 1968), Japanese actor
- Kanji Ishimaru (石丸 幹二; born 1965), Japanese actor and singer
- Kanji Ishiwara (石原 莞爾; 1889–1949), Japanese general
- Kanji Katō (加藤 寛治; 1870–1939), Japanese naval officer
- Kanji Kitamura (born 1955), the founder of Bagel K
- Kanji Kubo (久保 皖司; born 1938), Japanese sport shooter
- Kanji Kubomura (久保村 寛; born 1943), Japanese former cyclist
- Kanji Maruoka (丸岡 莞爾; 1836–1898), Japanese Governor
- Kanji Naruse (成瀬 関次; 1888–1948), Japanese swordsman, author, researcher and master of shurikenjutsu
- Kanji Nishio (西尾 幹二; born 1935), Japanese academic
- Kanji Okunuki (奥抜 侃志; born 1999), Japanese footballer
- Kanji Shigeoka (重岡 完治; born 1934), Japanese sport wrestler
- Kanji Shimokawa (下川 甲嗣; born 1999), Japanese rugby union player
- Kanji Suzumori (鈴森 勘司; born 1974), Japanese voice actor
- Kanji Tsuda (津田 寛治; born 1965), Japanese actor

== Fictional characters ==
- Kanji Tatsumi (巽 完二), a character in the video game Persona 4
- Kanji Koganegawa (黄金川 貫至), a character from the manga and anime Haikyu!! with the position of setter from Date Tech High
