= Education in ancient Tamil country =

Education was considered important in Ancient Tamil as they considered the mind of the uneducated to be an "abode of darkness". The sangam period of acquiring knowledge was during youth.

The rulers and aristocrats of ancient Tamilakam were always conscious of their duties to their country. They considered development of education as an important duty. So the kings and chieftains took all measures for the education of people. Naladiyar one of the Tamil books of Law lauds that "men gathered books in abundance and filled their house with them." They studied science, mathematics, engineering, astronomy, logic and ethics.

Education was widespread and there was high standard of literacy. Libraries attached to Jain Pallis and Buddha Viharas promoted education among the people. The Sangam literature makes clear that people irrespective of sectarian or sex considerations were entitled to get the benefits of full education, making the Tamil people one of the earliest civilisations to acquire high female literacy.

== Women and education ==
The girls of the Sangam age were given a good training in literature, music and drama. The Sangam literature bears ample evidence to the fact that many women had distinguished themselves in the art of music.

More than fifty women have been ranked among the Sangam poets.

== Late Sangam age ==
The Pallavas patronised both Prakrit and Sanskrit. They established an institution for Sanskrit at Kanji and lesser schools near Pondicherry. They attracted the best students from Tamilagam and other parts of the south. Buddhism particularly flourished in the next few centuries attracting students from Sri Lanka and as far flung as China. Bodhidharma is a noteworthy mention. Even though the Tamil language saw a decline during this period, Cilappatikaram and Manimekalai, two of The Five Great Epics of Tamil Literature were composed during this period. These epics broke with the Sangam convention of not mentioning the names or specific details of the characters, showing signs of growing influence from Sanskrit.

== Decline after Sangam age ==
Unlike the cosmopolitanism of the Sangam period, the new era of Vedic teaching was an exclusive privilege of the Brahmins as can be seen from Thirukkachi Nambi's refusal to teach Ramanuja vedic texts. The Guru Shishya parampara was instigated at this point and signalled the decline of education among females and the general population. This is in line with the Manusmrti injunction against teaching to lower castes, whereby if a Brahmin were to teach a Shudra, he would fall into Asamvrita, or hell; conversely, if a Shudra were to hear or utter the Veda, the penalty was that molten lead was poured into his ears and a hot stylus be thrust in his tongue, respectively.
