= Karaikandeswarar Temple, Kanji =

Karaikandeswarar Temple
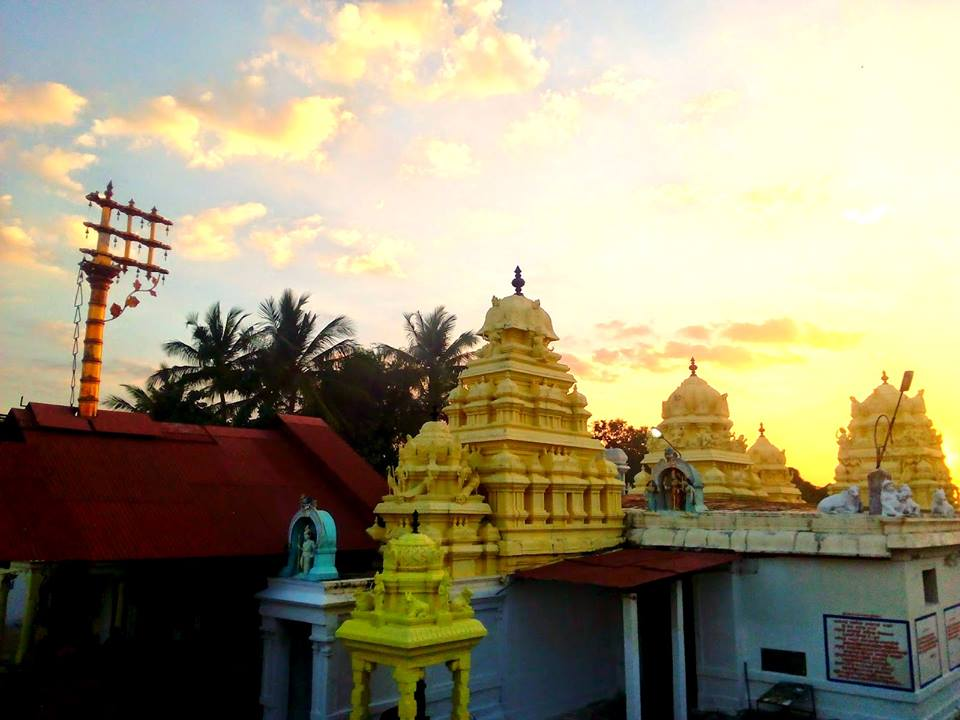
- View of the temple towers

- Location within Tamil Nadu

Religion
- Affiliation: Hinduism
- District: Tiruvannamalai district
- Deity: Karaikandeswarar (Shiva) Periyanayagi Amman (Parvati)
- Festival: Panguni Uthiram

Location
- Location: Kanji Village Panjayat
- State: Tamil Nadu
- Country: India
- Coordinates: 12°23′20.5″N 78°58′02.4″E

Architecture
- Type: Tamil

Karaikandeswarar Temple, Kanji is a Tamil Hindu temple dedicated to the deity Shiva, located in Kanji village near the town of Thiruvannamalai in Tamil Nadu, India. In this temple Shiva is worshiped as Karaikandeswarar, and is represented by the lingam. His consort Parvati is depicted as Periyanayagi Amman.

It is the first Karaikandeswarar (Shiva) temple among seven (saptha) temples located along the banks of Cheyyar River.

The temple has four daily rituals. The Panguni Uthiram festival is celebrated during the month of Panguni (March–April), the twelfth month of the Tamil solar calendar on the day the moon transits in the asterism (nakshatram) of Uttara-phalguni or Uthiram. It is the full moon of the month of Panguni.

The temple was constructed in the Dravidian style of architecture. The present masonry structure was built by Se.Ve.Venketaraman chettiyar.

== Religious practices ==
The temple priests perform the pooja (rituals) during festivals and on a daily basis. Like other Shiva temples of Tamil Nadu, the priests belong to the Shaivaite community, a Brahmin sub-caste. The temple rituals are performed four times a day; Ushathkalam at 5:30 a.m., Kalasanthi at 8:00 a.m., Uchikalam at 10:00 a.m., Sayarakshai at 6:00 p.m., and Ardha Jamam at 10:00 p.m.

Each ritual comprises four steps: abhisheka (sacred bath), alangaram (decoration), neivethanam (food offering) and deepa aradanai (waving of lamps) for both Karaikandeswarar and Periyanayagi Amman. There are weekly rituals like somavaram and sukravaram, fortnightly rituals like pradosham and monthly festivals like amavasai (new moon day), kiruthigai, pournami (full moon day) and sathurthi.

== Festivals ==
The temple celebrates dozens of festivals throughout the year. The most important of these is the Panguni Uthiram Brahmotsavam that lasts ten days during the Tamil month of Panguni (March–April) and concludes with the celebration of Kalyanotsavam. In Brahmotsavam, the idols of Karaikandeswarar and Periyanagi are decorated with clothes and jewels, are mounted on a vahana, and then taken around the maadha veeti (streets) in a pradakshinam (a clockwise circumambulation). This is repeated with different vahanas over the next nine days. The more important of the individual pradakshinams are the Athigara Nandhi on the first day, the Rishaba Vahanam on the midnight of the fifth day, and the Natarajar festival on the ninth day.

Tiruvoodal is another festival celebrated during the first week of the Tamil month Thai at mid-January of every year. On the morning of Maatu Pongal, between 15 and 16 January, Nandi is decorated with garlands made of fruits, vegetables and sweets. The festival deities of Karaikandeswarar and Periyanayagi Amman are taken out of the temple to Tiruoodal street to enact the oodal (or love tiff) between the two in the evening.
