= Mulligatawny =

Curry soup based on an Indian recipe of the British Raj times

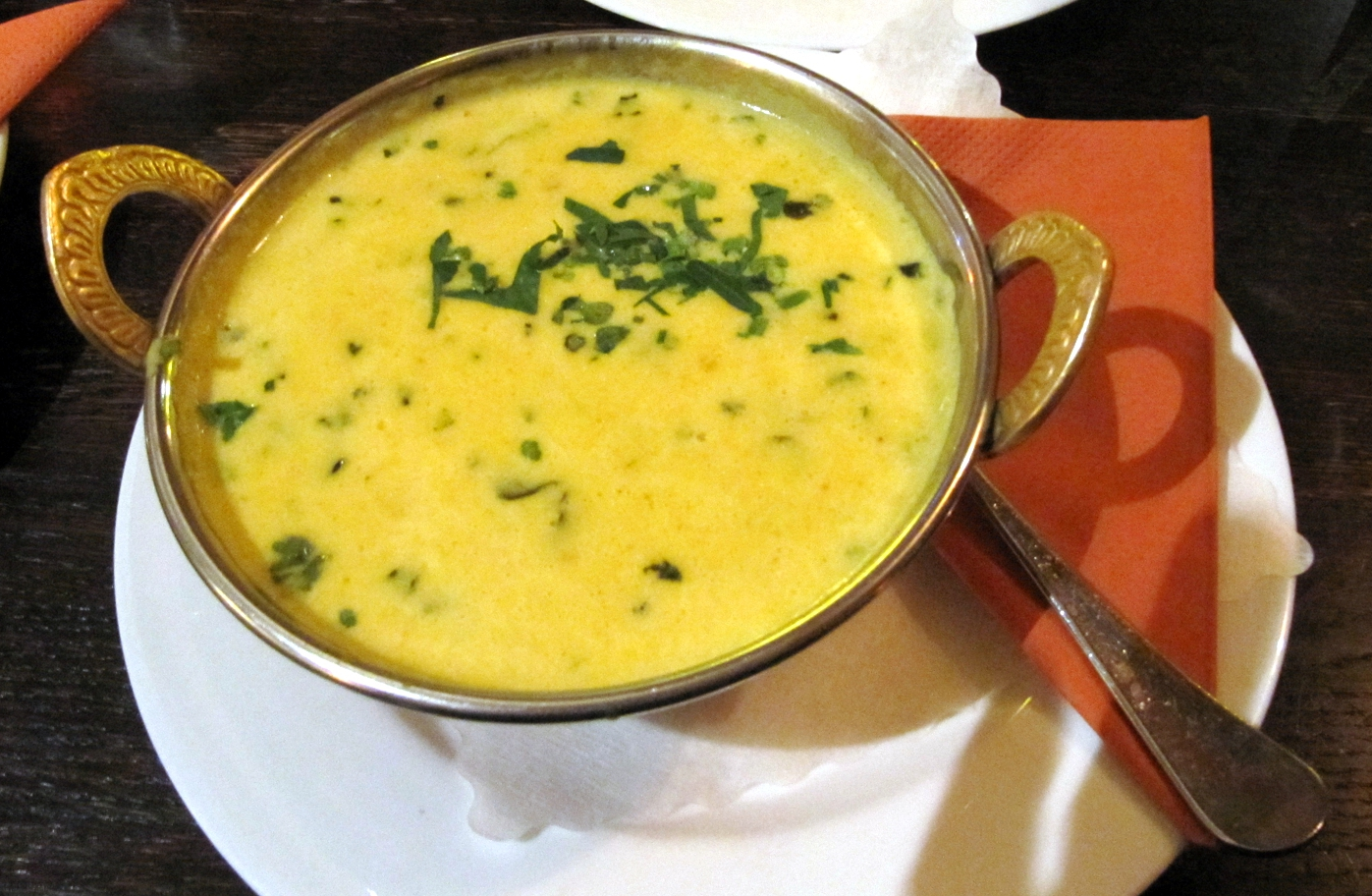
- Mulligatawny as served in Mumbai
- Type: Other
- Place of origin: Tamil Nadu, India
- Serving temperature: Hot, often with rice
- Similar dishes: Rasam

Mulligatawny (/ˌmʌlɪɡəˈtɔːni/) is a soup which originated from rasam in Tamil cuisine, though much transformed during its adoption into Anglo-Indian cuisine. The name originates from the Tamil words miḷagu (மிளகு 'black pepper'), and thanneer (தண்ணீர், 'water'); literally, "pepper-water".

Main ingredients commonly include chicken, mutton, and lentils.

== History ==
Mulligatawny was popular in India by the end of the 18th century, and by the 19th century it began to appear in cookbooks of the day, with each cook (or cookbook) featuring its own recipe. Recipes for mulligatawny varied greatly at that time and over the years (e.g., Maria Rundell's A New System of Domestic Cookery contained three versions), and later versions of the soup included British modifications that included meat, although the local Madras (modern Chennai) recipe on which it was based did not. Early references to it in English go back to 1784. In 1827, William Kitchiner wrote that it had become fashionable in Britain:

Mullaga-Tawny signifies pepper water. The progress of inexperienced peripatetic Palaticians (Note: "Palatician" may be a nonce word derived from "palate", in the sense of the ability to distinguish between and appreciate different flavours.) has lately been arrested by this outlandish word being pasted on the windows of our Coffee-Houses; it has, we believe, answered the "Restaurateurs'" purpose, and often excited John Bull, to walk in and taste—the more familiar name of Curry Soup—would, perhaps, not have had sufficient of the charms of novelty to seduce him from his much-loved Mock-Turtle. It is a fashionable Soup and a great favourite with our East Indian friends, and we give the best receipt (Note: "Receipt" is an old form of "recipe".) we could procure for it.

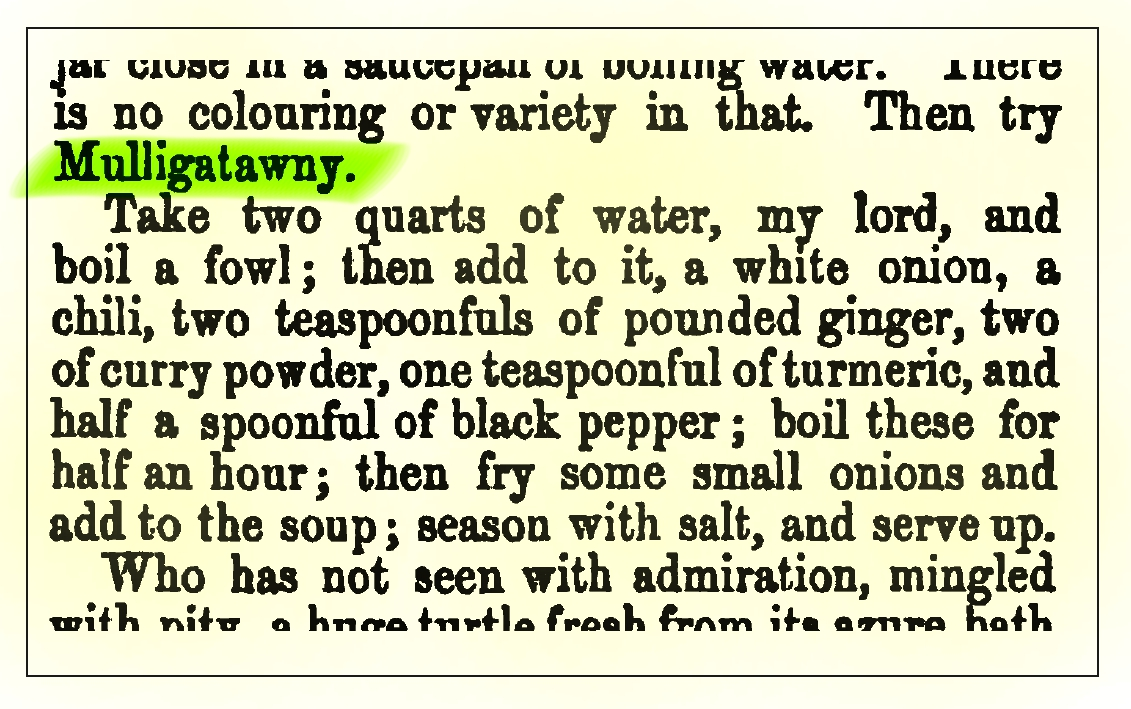
Mulligatawny recipe from Charles Dickens's weekly magazine All The Year Round, 22 August 1868 (page 249)

In 1878, Arthur Robert Kenney-Herbert (1840–1916), under the pen name Wyvern, wrote in his popular Culinary Jottings that "really well-made mulligatunny is ... a thing of the past." He wrote that this simple recipe prepared by poorer natives of Madras as made by "Mootoosamy" was made by pounding:

a dessert-spoonful of tamarind, six red chillies, six cloves of garlic, a tea-spoonful of mustard seed, a salt-spoonful of fenugreek seed, twelve black peppercorns, a tea-spoonful of salt, and six leaves of karay-pauk. When worked to a paste, he adds a pint of water, and boils the mixture for a quarter of an hour. While this is going on, he cuts up two small onions, puts them into a chatty, and fries them in dessert-spoonful of ghee till they begin to turn brown, when he strains the pepper-water into the chatty, and cooks the mixture for five minutes, after which it is ready. The pepper-water is, of course, eaten with a large quantity of boiled rice, and is a meal in itself. The English, taking their ideas from this simple composition, added other condiments, with chicken, mutton, &c., thickened the liquid with flour and butter, and by degrees succeeded in concocting a soupe grasse of a decidedly acceptable kind.

== Ingredients ==
According to The Oxford Companion to Food, the simplest version of the soup included chicken or mutton, fried onion, and spices. More complex versions may call for "a score of ingredients". Versions originating in southern India commonly called for lentils.

== See also ==
- List of soups
