= Chitranna =

Indian rice-based dish

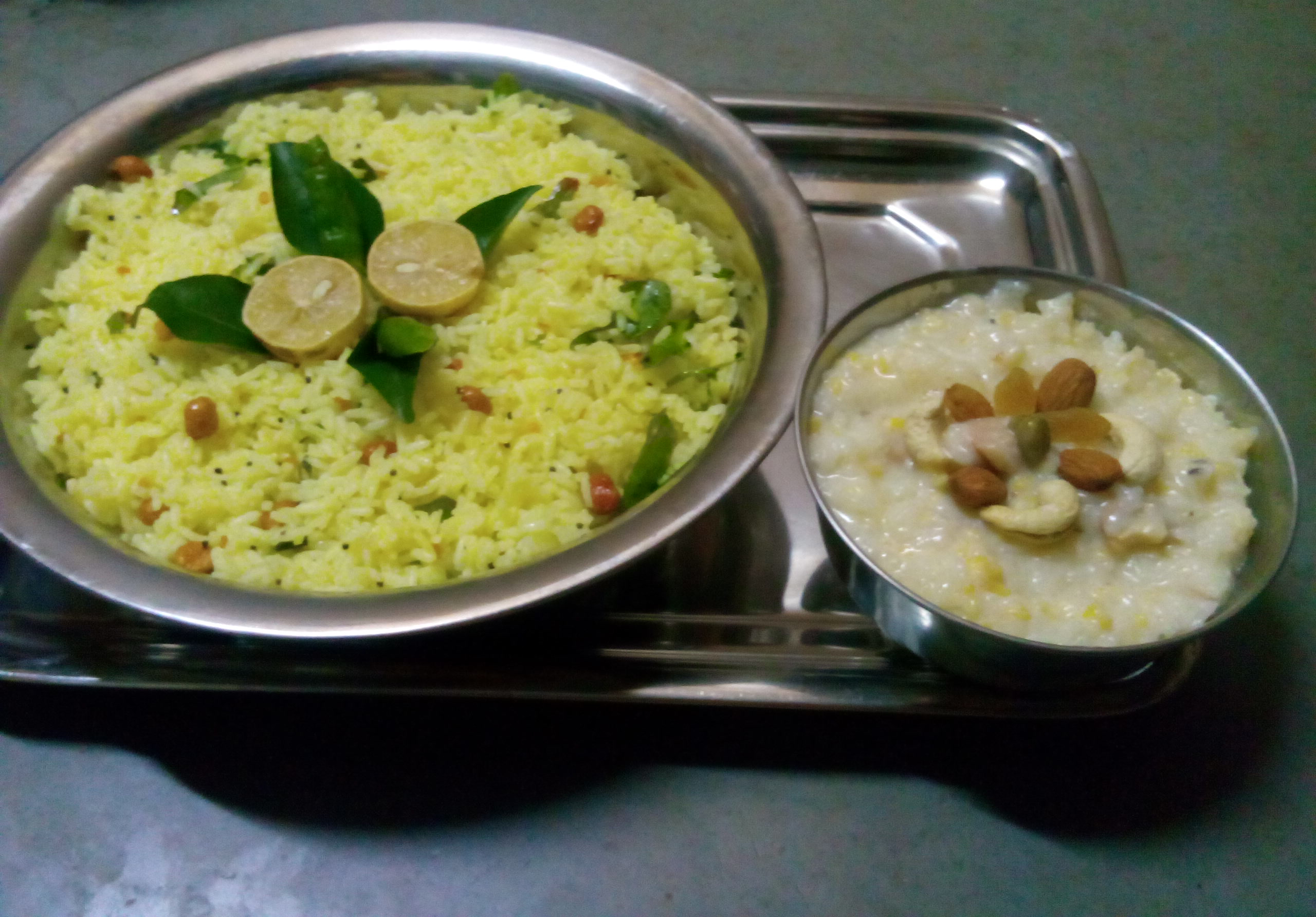
- Chitranna (left) served with payasam
- Alternative names: Lemon rice
- Course: Breakfast, can be an accompanying dish served with Lunch and Dinner too.
- Place of origin: India
- Region or state: Karnataka
- Main ingredients: Rice
- Variations: Mavinakayi Chitranna, Nimbehannu Chitranna, Irulli Chitranna, Kayi-Sasive Chitranna

Chitranna (Kannada: ಚಿತ್ರಾನ್ನ), also known as Lemon rice, is a rice-based dish widely prepared in South India. It is prepared by mixing cooked rice with a special seasoning called Oggarane or Gojju. Characteristic of the seasoning are mustard seeds, fried lentils, peanuts, curry leaves, chillies, lemon juice and other optional items such as scrapes of unripe mango. Added turmeric powder gives Chitranna its yellow color. Garlic and onions are also used in the seasoning by some, although traditionally they do not form part of the recipe. The dish is especially popular in the south Indian state of Karnataka, where it has become a part of the daily diet.

== History ==
Chitranna rice dish finds its mention in medieval Indian cookbooks Manasollasa (1130 CE) and Pakadarpana (1200 CE) as "Chitrapaka".

== Varieties ==
Depending on the ingredients, various types of Chitranna can be prepared:

- Nimbehannu Chitranna (Kannada: ನಿಂಬೆಹಣ್ಣು ಚಿತ್ರಾನ್ನ) : This is the famous 'Lemon Rice' prepared by mixing cooked rice with turmeric and lemon juice
- Eerulli Chitranna (Kannada: ಈರುಳ್ಳಿ ಚಿತ್ರಾನ್ನ) : Onion Chitranna; Fried onion, mustard seeds, split chickpeas and green chillies are mixed with cooked rice
- Mavinakayi Chitranna (Kannada: ಮಾವಿನಕಾಯಿ ಚಿತ್ರಾನ್ನ) : Mango Chitranna; Raw, unripe mango is ground into a paste and mixed with cooked rice
- Kayi-Sasive Chitranna (Kannada: ಕಾಯಿ-ಸಾಸಿವೆ ಚಿತ್ರಾನ್ನ) : Grated coconut and mustard seeds are ground into a paste and mixed with cooked rice
- Heralekayi Chitranna (Kannada: ಹೆರಳೇಕಾಯಿ ಚಿತ್ರಾನ್ನ) : This is made by using Citron Lime and rice.

== See also ==
- Pulihora (tamarind rice)
