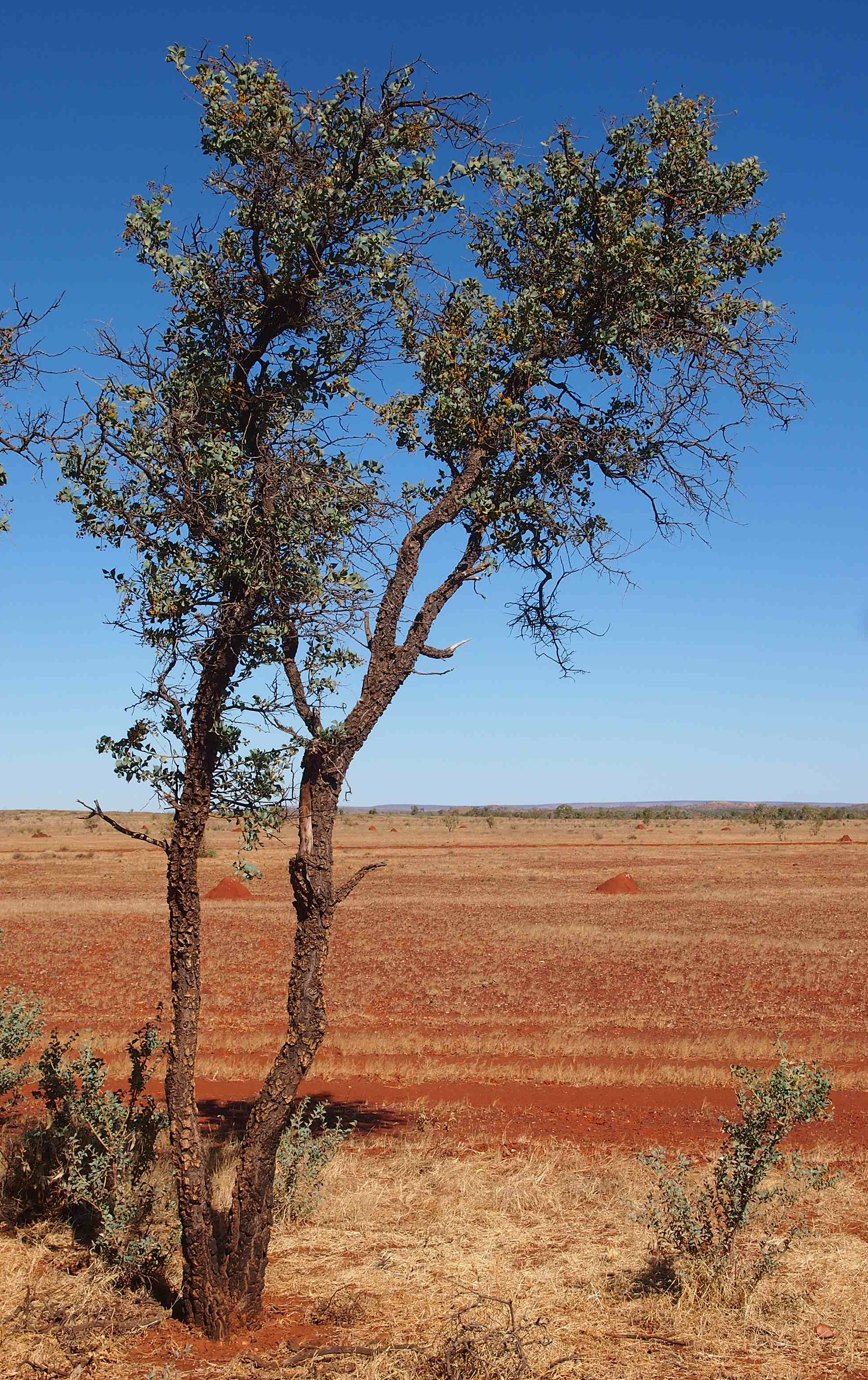
- Habit

Scientific classification
- Kingdom: Plantae
- Clade: Tracheophytes
- Clade: Angiosperms
- Clade: Eudicots
- Clade: Rosids
- Order: Fabales
- Family: Fabaceae
- Subfamily: Caesalpinioideae
- Clade: Mimosoid clade
- Genus: Acacia
- Species: A. inaequilatera

Binomial name
- Acacia inaequilatera Domin
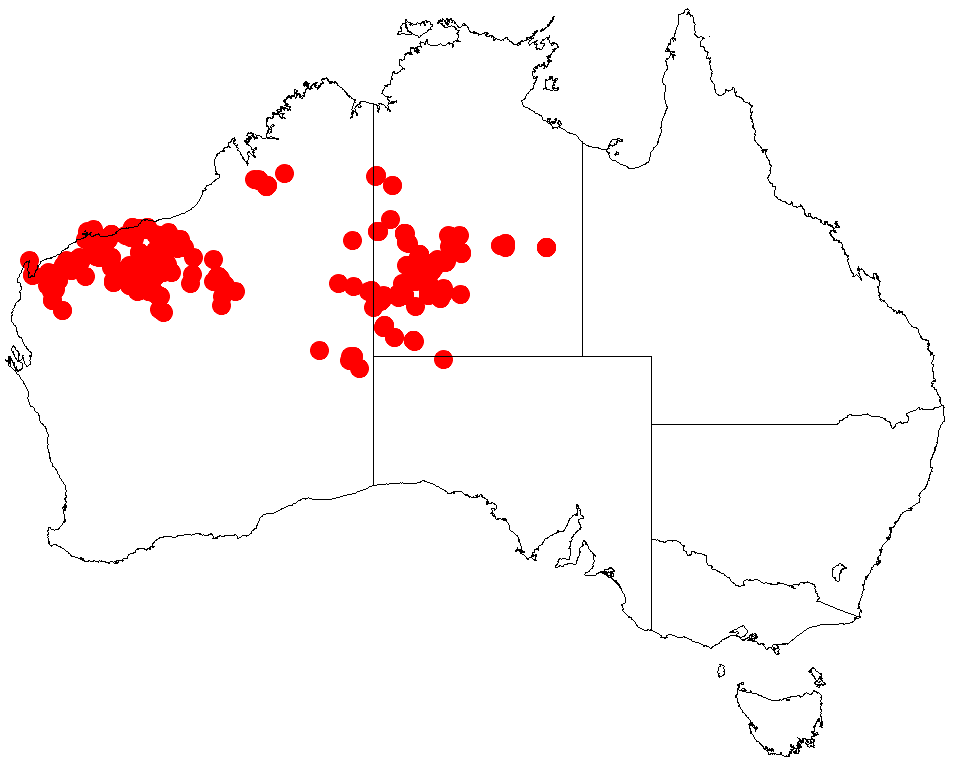
- Occurrence data from AVH

Synonyms
- Racosperma inaequilaterum (Domin) Pedley

= Acacia inaequilatera =

Kanji bush

Species of legume

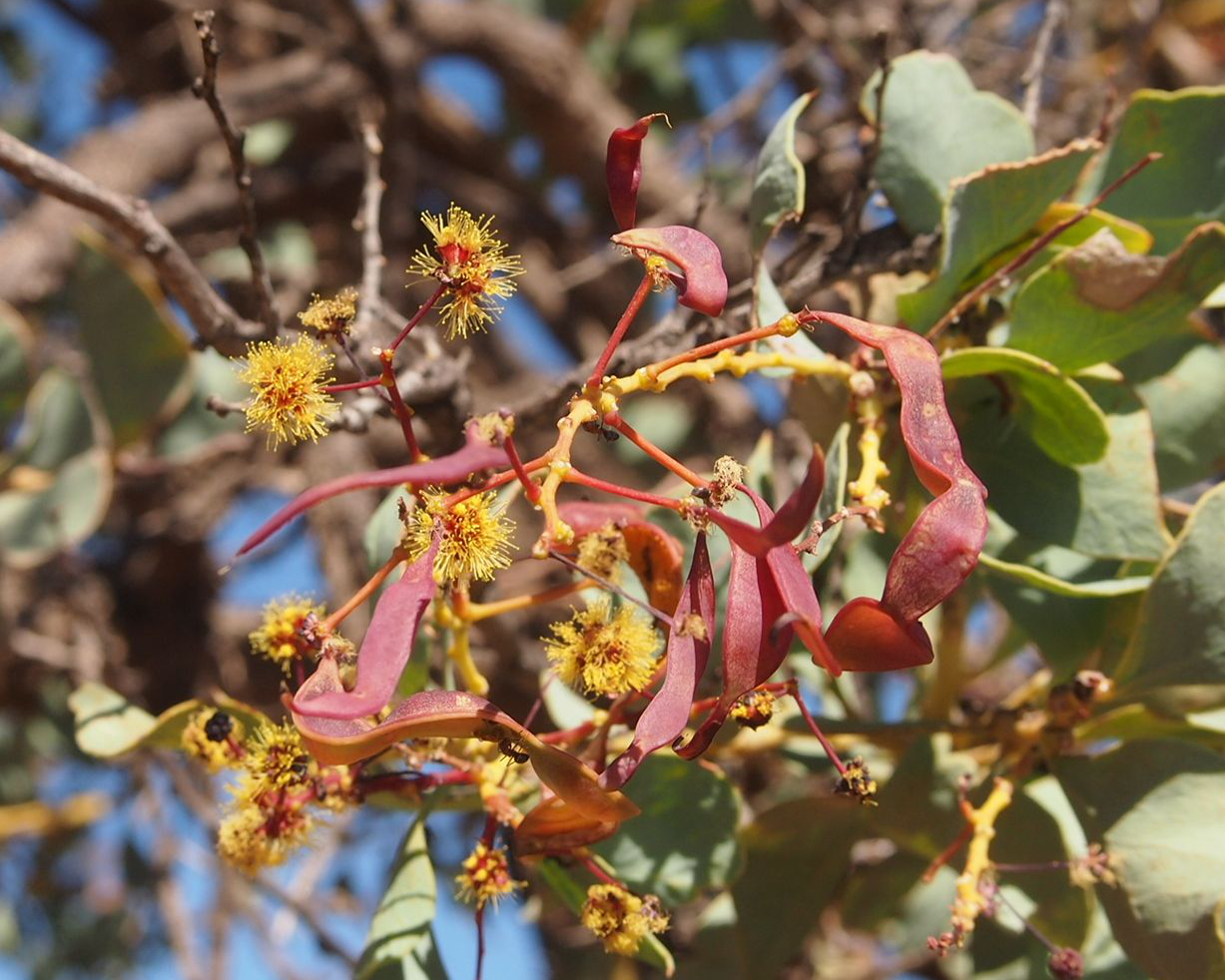
Flowers and legumes

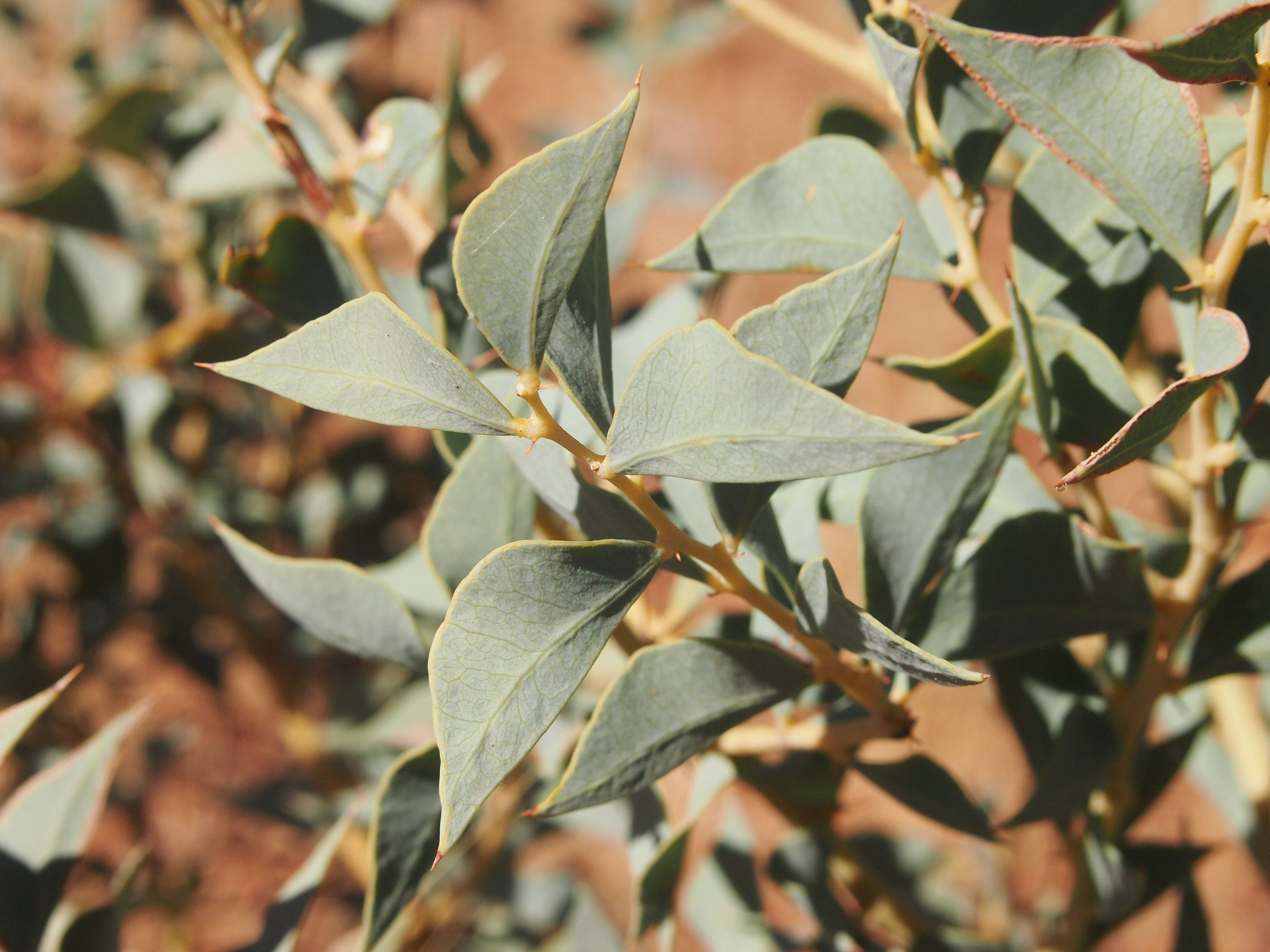
Foliage

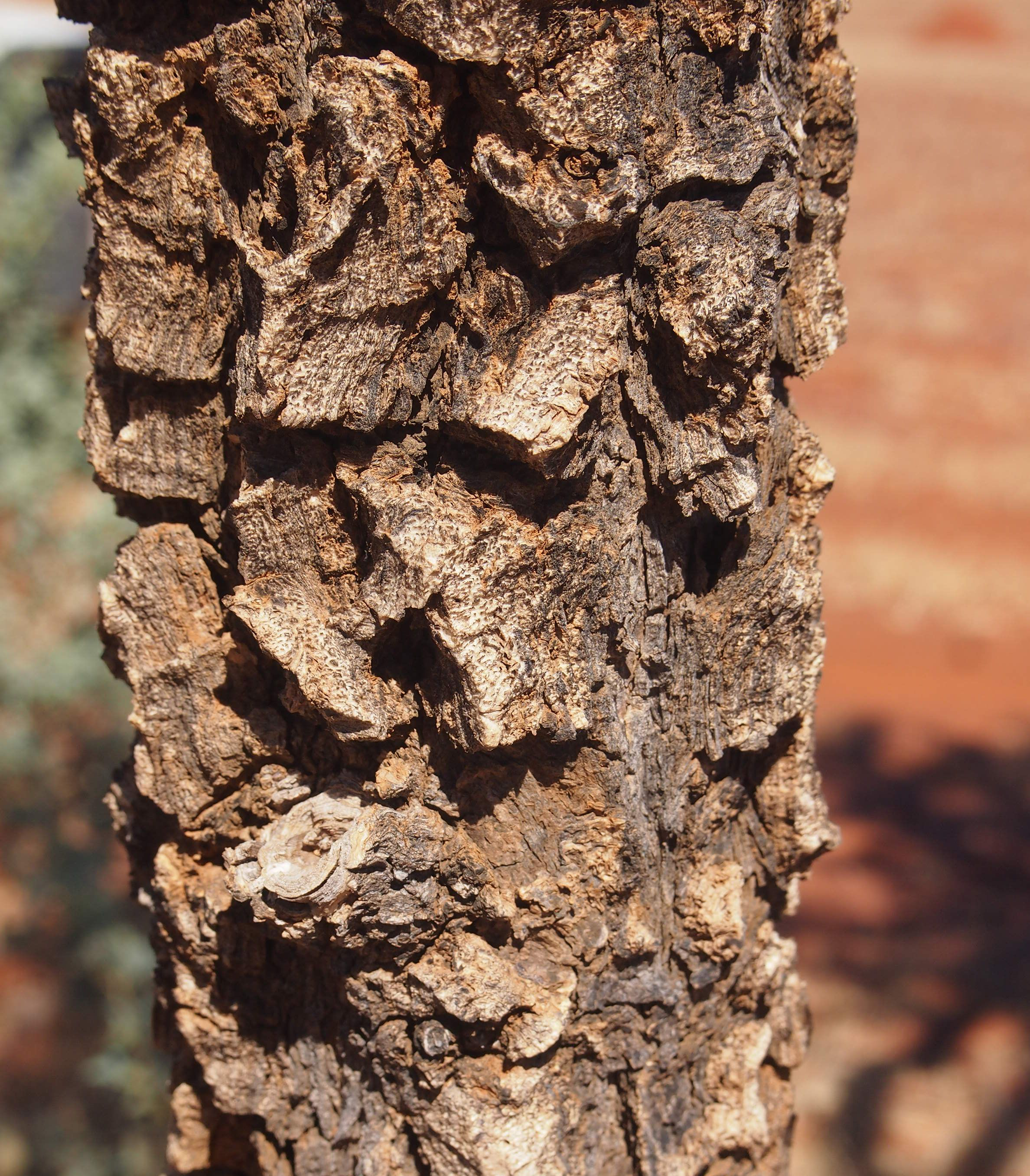
Bark

Acacia inaequilatera, commonly known as kanji bush, baderi, camel bush, fire wattle, kanyji bush or ranji bush is a tree in the family Mimosaceae. Endemic to Australia, it is widely distributed in the semi-arid Triodia country eastwards from Karratha, Western Australia into the Northern Territory.

== Description ==
Kanji bush is a gnarled tree or shrub with a single trunk, corky bark, spiny foliage and stems. It grows to a height of between 2 and 5 m (6 ft 7 in and 16 ft 5 in) but can reach as high as 8 m (26 ft). It has thick, rough, corky, dark grey to black coloured bark on the main trunk that is often scarred by fire. Its phyllodes are a blue-grey and leathery with a curved midrib and a short spine at the tip. The phyllodes are asymmetrically egg-shaped to elliptic, 15–70 mm (0.59–2.76 in) long and 6–45 mm (0.24–1.77 in) wide and there is a spiny stipule at the base of the phyllodes.

Unusually for Acacia species, the flowers are not pure yellow, but rather yellow with a reddish purple centre. The flowers occur between May and October are borne in spherical clusters about 5 mm (0.20 in) in diameter. The pods are flat and curved, up to 10 cm (3.9 in) long and 1 cm (0.39 in) wide. They can be strongly curved to coiled and are raised high over the seeds and slightly constricted between. The pods have a pale maroon colour when young but deepen to a mid-brown or pinkish-purplish brown as they age. The dull dark brown seeds within are arranged longitudinally oblique within the pod. Each seed has a length of 4 to 6 m (13 to 20 ft) and has an obloid to globose shape.

Kanji bush is very fire tolerant and colonises rapidly after a bushfire. It is able to regenerate from or and resprout from the base or epicormically It is short-lived, lasting less than ten years.

== Taxonomy ==
Acacia inaequilatera was first formally described by the botanist Karel Domin in 1926 in Bibliotheca Botanica from specimens collected near the Ashburton and Yule Rivers. The specific epithet is derived from the Latin word inaequilatera meaning with unequal sides, referring to the very asymmetric phyllodes. A. inaequilerata is closely related to Acacia trudgeniana and has inflorescences and phyllodes resembling those of Acacia marramamba, it is also often confused with Acacia pyrifolia.

== Distribution ==
It has a scattered distribution throughout arid areas of the north western tip of South Australia, the south western parts of the Northern Territoryand the Pilbara and southern parts of the Kimberley regions of Western Australia where it is found on rocky hillsides, stony hills and plains growing in sandy to loamy stony soils. It is often part of tall shrubland communities with a spinifex understorey.

== Uses ==
Indigenous Australians used the seeds of the plant as raw bush tucker or after roasting over a fire or grinding the seeds into a flour and preparing as damper. After grinding the seeds can also be used to make a beverage resembling coffee. The seeds, as for most Acacia are quite nutritious and contain around 26% protein, 2% carbohydrate and 9% fat Acacia seeds are highly nutritious and contain around 26% protein, 26% available carbohydrate, 32% fibre and 9% fat. An edible gum also exudes from the trunk and branches. The bark was also used for medicinal purposes to treat skin complains and sores by boiling in water or using the ash from burning it in fire. The tannins leached out of the bark in water make an astringent solution which were taken to treat diarrhoea and dysentery.

== See also ==
- List of Acacia species
