= Meifu Shinkage-ryū =

Modern Shurikenjustu school

Meifu Shinkage-ryū (明府真影流) is a modern Shurikenjutsu-School, which was founded in the 1970s by Chikatoshi Someya (染谷親俊, Someya Chikatoshi). Its roots could mainly be found in the Shurikenjutsu of Tenshin Shōden Katori Shintō-ryū (天真正伝香取神道流).

== Description ==
The Meifu Shinkage-ryū is a modern school of Shurikenjutsu. It was founded by Chikatoshi Someya (染谷親俊, Someya Chikatoshi) in the 1970s. Someya was a student of Yoshio Sugino of the Katori Shintō-ryū, although the throwing style used in Meifu Shinkage-ryū is different. Someya refined the Katori style of throwing, making it shorter, faster and more concealed.

The Meifu Shinkage-ryū is a small school of about 30 students who train in Tōkyō, Japan under the instruction of the present sōke, Yasuyuki Ōtsuka. This school is almost entirely composed of students of other martial arts schools. Ōtsuka welcomes students from any art or country. Currently around 200 international students train in Meifu Shinkage-ryū (Ōtsuka, personal communication October 18, 2016), divided in official Branches and Keikokai (study groups). Ōtsuka calls himself a "shuriken teacher and researcher." There is a specific kind of shuriken called a Meifu Shinkage-ryū shuriken, but Ōtsuka teaches and students will often practice throwing shuriken from many different schools, most of which are now extinct.

== Techniques ==
Shurikenjutsu

- Kamae
  - Shizentai
  - Chudan no Kamae
  - Gedan no Kamae
  - Jodan no Kamae
- Waza
  - Shomen Uchi
  - Gyaku Uchi
  - Dosoku Uchi
  - Shitate Uchi
  - Za Uchi
  - Aruki Uchi
  - Hashiri Uchi
  - Ne Uchi

Fundō Kusarijutsu

- Kamae
  - Fuko
  - Zanshin
  - Osame
  - Hikitori
- Waza
  - Metsubushi
  - Yokomen Uchi
  - Yokoichi Monji
  - Kesa Uchi
  - Hachinoji Uchi

== Dōjō ==
- Japan: Tōkyō (Honbu Dōjō), Ōsaka
- USA: California - Arizona - Illinois
- Spain: Barcelona - Valencia
- Germany: Bremen
- Austria: Langenlebarn
- Finland: Helsinki
- Great Britain: Birmingham - Leeds - London - Nottingham South East
- Russia: Moskau
- Czech Republic:
- Netherlands: Haarlem/Amsterdam - Eindhoven
- Italy
- Mexico
- Chile
- Australia: Melbourne, Brisbane
- Canada: Ontario, Saskatchewan, Manitoba, Alberta
- Sweden
- Estonia: Tallinn

== DVDs and videos ==
- Someya, Chikatoshi (1987) Meifu-Shinkage-ryu Shuriken Jutsu
- Someya, Chikatoshi (1992) Shurikenjutsu and Kusarijutsu
- Ōtsuka, Yasuyuki (2004) Hiden! Shurikenjutsu
