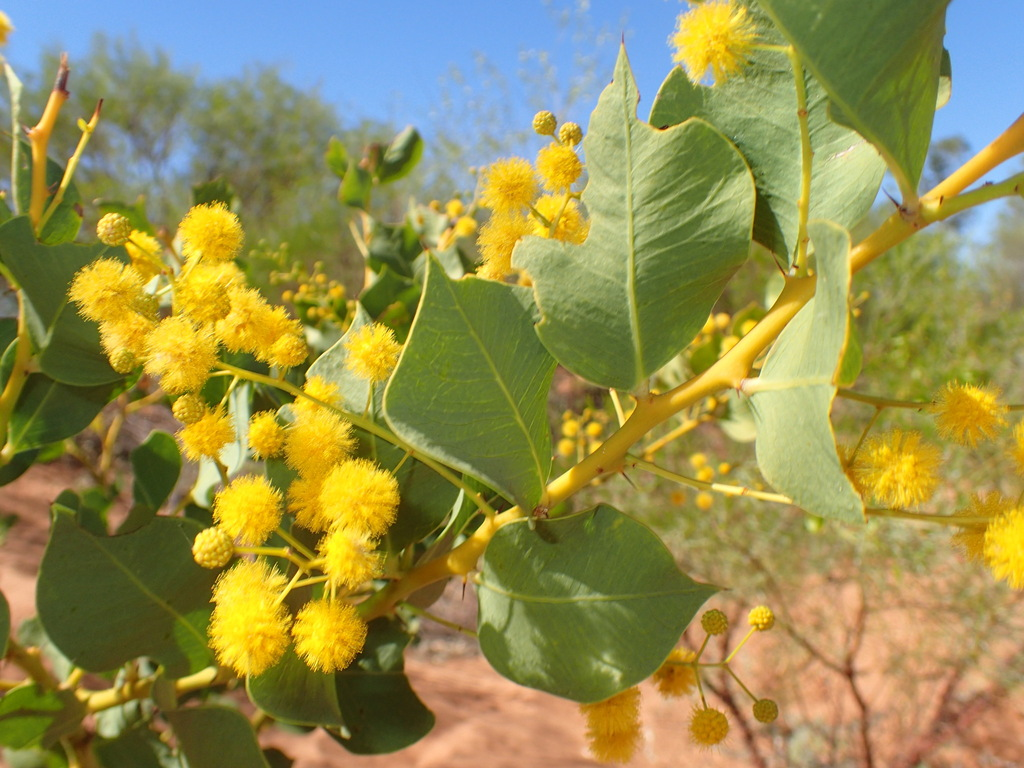
- Subsp. morrisonii in the east Pilbara

Scientific classification
- Kingdom: Plantae
- Clade: Embryophytes
- Clade: Tracheophytes
- Clade: Spermatophytes
- Clade: Angiosperms
- Clade: Eudicots
- Clade: Rosids
- Order: Fabales
- Family: Fabaceae
- Subfamily: Caesalpinioideae
- Clade: Mimosoid clade
- Genus: Acacia
- Species: A. pyrifolia

Binomial name
- Acacia pyrifolia DC.
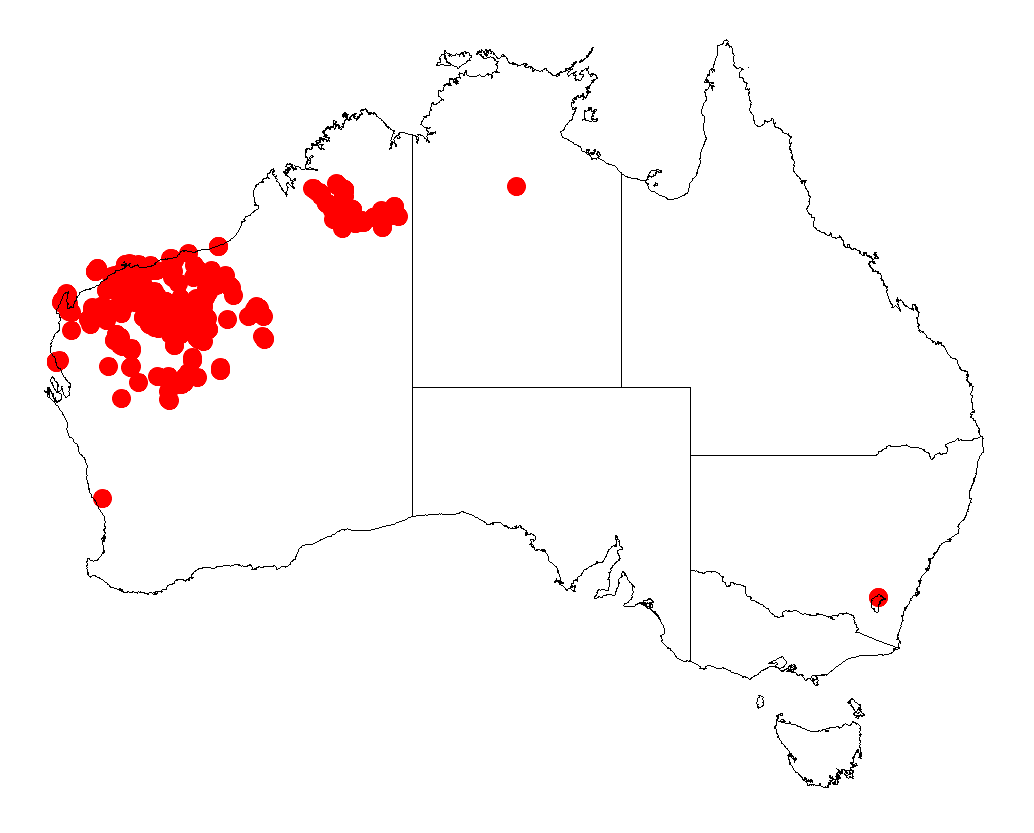
- Occurrence data from AVH

Synonyms
- Acacia clementii Domin; Acacia morrisonii Domin; Acacia pyrifolia var. morrisonii Maiden; Acacia pyrifolia var. morrisoni orth. var. Maiden; Racosperma pyrifolium (DC.) Pedley

= Acacia pyrifolia =

Ranji bush

Species of legume

Acacia pyrifolia, commonly known as ranji bush is a shrub that is endemic to the north of Western Australia.

== Description ==
The bush or tree typically grows to a maximum height of 4.5 m (15 ft) and has smooth grey bark on the main stem and branched with more yellowish coloured bark on the upper branches. It can have an open an straggly a sometimes dense habit. The glabrous branchlets are often covered in a fine white powdery coating and have spinose stipules. Like most species of Acacia it has phyllodes rather than true leaves. The blue-grey to grey-green pungent and coriaceous phyllodes usually have an elliptic to obovate or orbicular shape with a length of 2.5 to 6 cm (0.98 to 2.36 in) and a width of 1.5 to 4 cm (0.59 to 1.57 in) and have a prominent and central midrib. It produces rounded yellow flowerheads between April and August in the species' native range. The simple inflorescences occur along a 3 to 18 cm (1.2 to 7.1 in) long raceme with showy, spherical flower-heads that are densely packed with 70 to 80 bright golden coloured flowers. Following flowering shallowly curved to openly once-coiled seed pods form that have a narrowly oblong shape and are rounded over seeds. The firmly chartaceous pods are up to 6 cm (2.4 in) in length and 8 to 15 mm (0.31 to 0.59 in) wide and contain dull dark brown coloured seeds with a broadly elliptic to ovate shape.

== Taxonomy ==
It was first formally described in 1825 by Swiss botanist Augustin Pyramus de Candolle in the second volume of his publication Prodromus Systematis Naturalis Regni Vegetabilis. The species is closely related to Acacia inaequilatera, Acacia strongylophylla and Acacia marramamba and A. strongylophylla which make up the Acacia pyrifolia group which is closely allied to the Acacia victoriae group.

== Distribution ==
The plant is found in the Pilbara, Kimberley and northern parts of the Mid West regions of Western Australia where it is situated along watercourses, on plains and lower slopes and along road-sides growing in sand or loamy clay or alluvial sand or skeletal soils often over or around sandstone. Its range extends from around Carnarvon in the west to around Meektharra in the south to Rudall River National Park in the east and Wallal Downs in the north. It is also found near Windjana Gorge to around Halls Creek in the southern part of the Kimberley.

== See also ==
- List of Acacia species
