= Kranji Station =

Kranji Station may refer to the following:

- Kranji MRT station in Singapore
- Kranji railway station in Bekasi, West Java
- Kranji railway station, Singapore, a former station in Singapore built along the Singapore-Johore Railway
