= Kanji (food) =

Indian rice-based dish

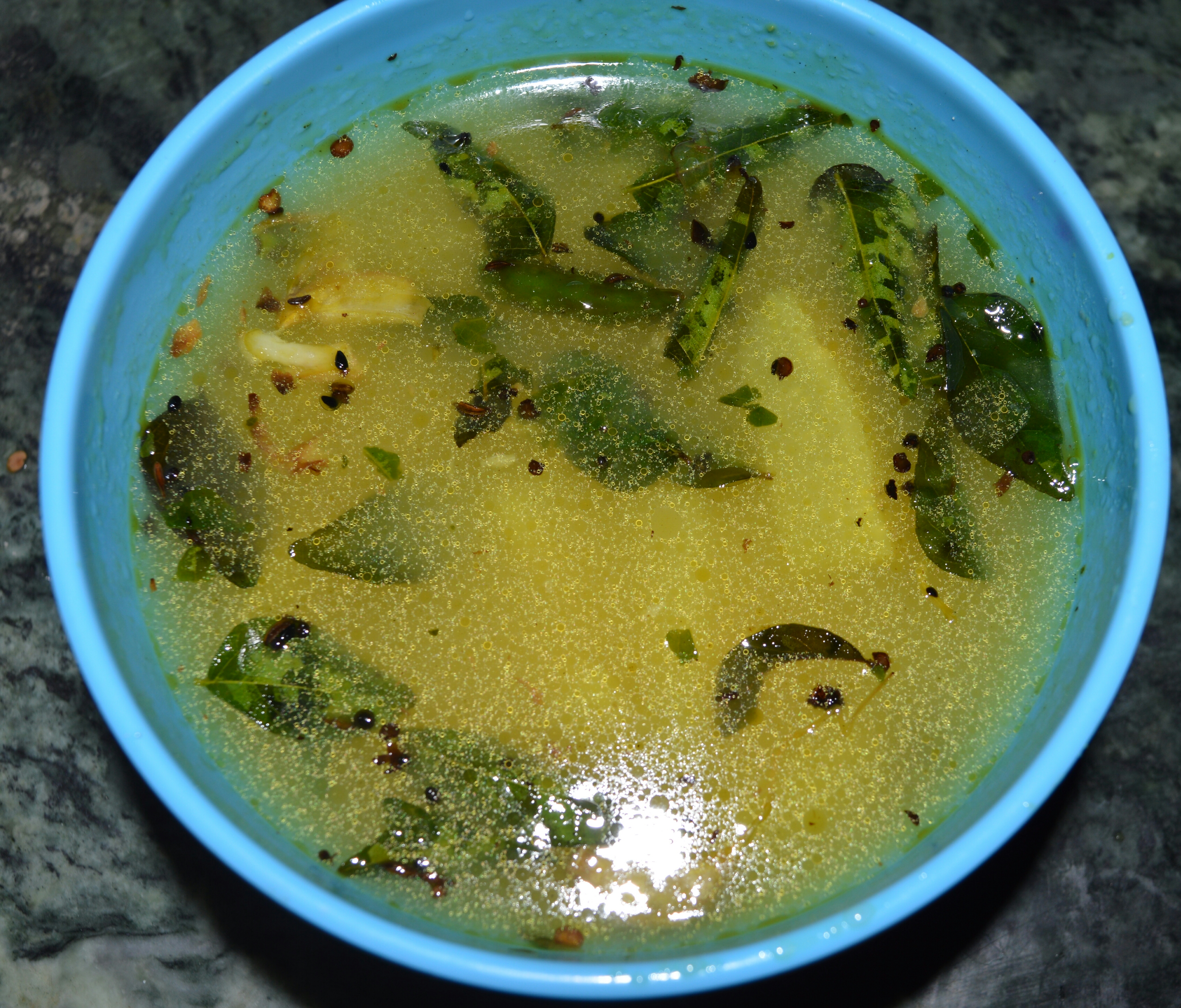
- Torani Kanji
- Alternative names: Ambila
- Type: Curry, Porridge
- Course: Side dish
- Place of origin: India
- Region or state: Tamil Nadu, Kerala, Odisha,Andhra Pradesh
- Serving temperature: Warm
- Main ingredients: Rice water, curd, green vegetables
- Variations: Dahi Kanji, Paribā Kanji, Torāni Kanji, Sāga Kanji

Kānji is a rice water based dish traditionally prepared in Indian states including Orissa, Andhra Pradesh, Tamil Nadu and Kerala. Depending on how it is prepared, it is eaten with soup or curry. It is one of the Chappan Bhog (56 food items also known as Mahaprasad) offered to the Hindu god Jagannath of Puri as part of the last meal of the day (known as Badaw Singhara Bhogaw). During the Odia festival of Kanji Anla Osha, kanji is offered to the Hindu goddess Sathi in Odisha.

== Variations in Odisha ==
There are many varieties of kanji prepared in various parts of Odisha.

=== Dåhi (curd) kānji ===
There are mostly two variations of dåhi kānji. In one, boiled rice is used as the base and in the other gram flour (Besan) or rice flour is used.

=== Påribā (vegetable) kanji ===
Vegetables in general, called Påribā in Odia, are cut in tiny pieces, boiled in Karahi aka the Indian wok (Odia: କଢ଼େଇ) and curd and gram flour or rice flour are added to the boiling vegetables.

=== Torani (water of cooked rice or Pakhala) kanji ===
The main ingredient involved in making this dish are torani (Odia: ତୋରାଣି) also known as "peja torani" (Odia: ପେଜ ତୋରାଣି) which is the rice water extracted after boiling rice, left for few days to ferment until it develops sour flavors. Optionally a piece of Ambula (Odia: ଆମ୍ବୂଲ) can be added to it. Once it starts to give off a sour aroma, it is cooked with vegetables to make Torani kanji.

During Kanji Anla Osha which falls in the month of October or November, Torani Kanji is offered to the Hindu goddess Shathi (Odia: ଶଠି) along with dried fish and anla, radish curry, poi and other puja items. Farmers also offer kanji to their farmland in the hope of a good harvest.

=== Sāgå / Påtrå (greens) kanji ===
When torani kanji is prepared by adding any greens known as Sāgå (ଶାଗ) in Odia, it's called sāgå or påtrå kanji. Usually any of the locally available greens such as drumstick leaves (Odia:ସଜନା ଶାଗ) or shallot leaves (Odia: ଗନ୍ଧନା gandhanā) or purple amaranthus (Odia: କୋଶିଳା kosåḷā) or goråkurå (Odia: ଗୋରକୁର) also known as Khåṭā Pāḷångå (Odia: ଖଟା ପାଳଙ୍ଗ).

There are also many regional variations like prawn (Odia: ଚିଙ୍ଗୁଡି chinguṛi) kanji, crab (Odia: କଙ୍କଡା kånkåṛā) kanji, dry fish (Odia: ଶୁଖୁଆ sukhuā and khåṛā (Odia: ଖଡା) kanji.

== See also ==
- Congee, a related food whose name originates from Tamil kanji (கஞ்சி, kañci, IPA: [ˈkaɲdʑi])
- Kanji (drink)
