= Kanji (drink) =

Indian fermented drink

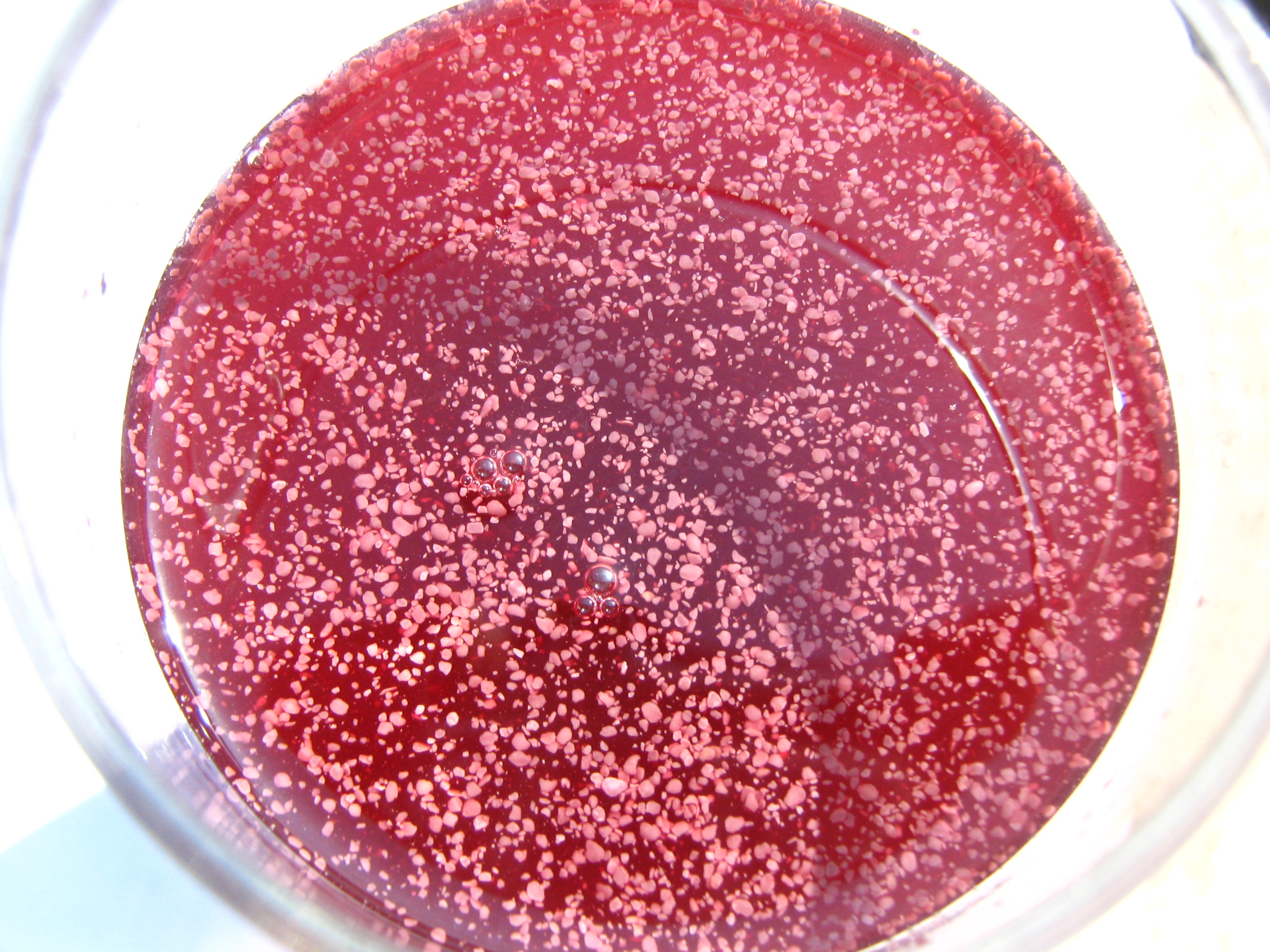
A close-up of Kanji drink

Kanji is a fermented drink, originating from the Indian subcontinent, made in India for the festival of Holi.

It is particularly popular in Northern during the months of winter and early spring when black carrots are in season.

Kanji is made with water, black carrots, beetroot, mustard seeds and heeng. It may be served with boondi sprinkled on top.

Nutritionally, kanji is high in antioxidants. Eleven strains of probiotic bacteria have been isolated from kanji, with the strain Pediococcus acidilactici genotypically characterised with high growth potential.

== See also ==
- List of Indian beverages
- Şalgam
- Kanji (food)
