= Shurikenjutsu =

Traditional Japanese martial arts of shuriken throwing

Shurikenjutsu (手裏剣術)
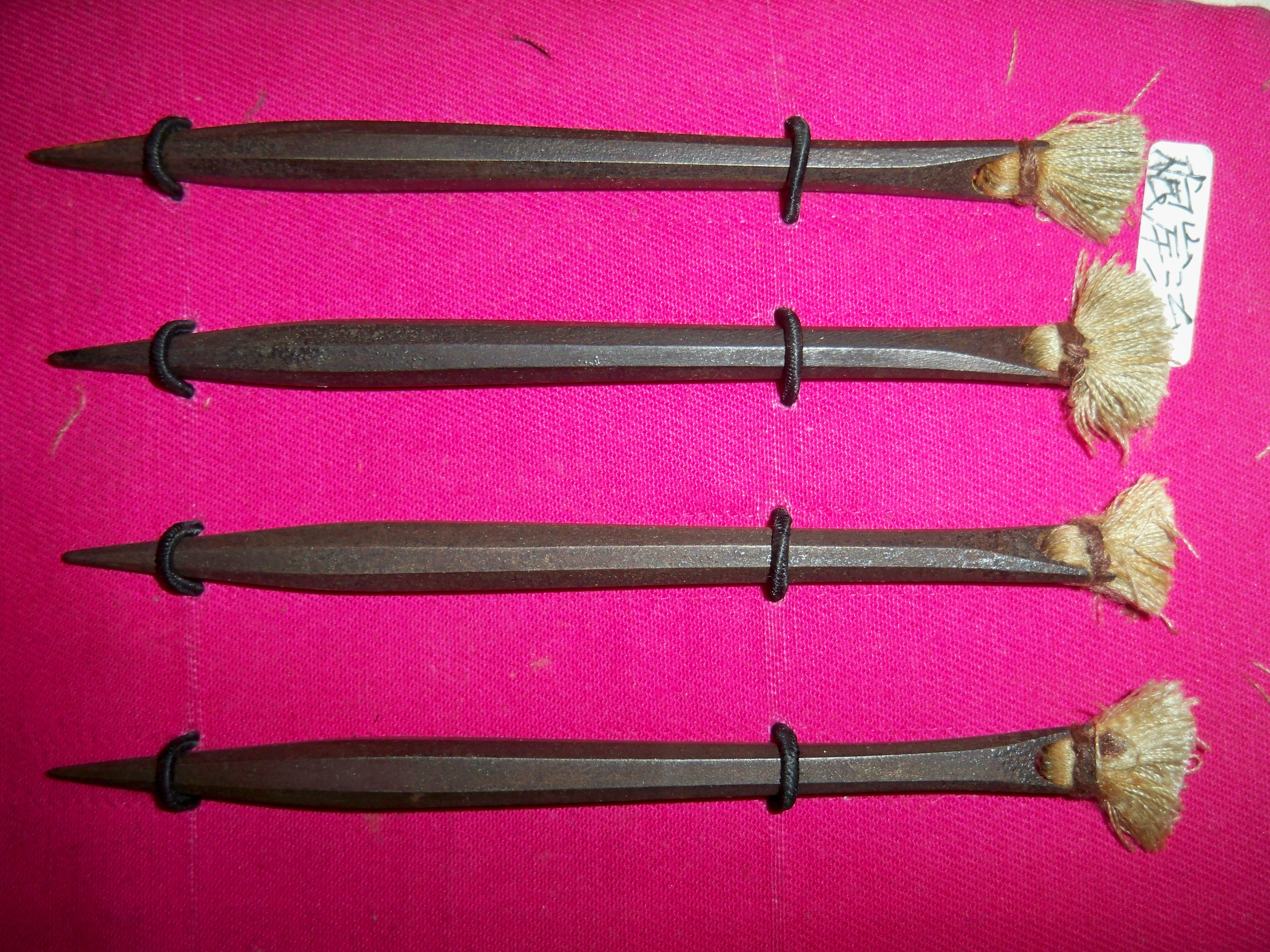
- Negishi-ryū shuriken (c.1850)
- Focus: Weaponry (shuriken)
- Country of origin: Japan
- Famous practitioners: Saito Satoshi; Fujita Seiko

Shurikenjutsu (手裏剣術) is a traditional Japanese martial art (kobudō) which specializes in blade throwing.

== History ==
The development of shurikenjutsu peaked during Japan's peaceful Edo period (1603-1868).

Supplementary teachings were added to the curriculums of numerous schools, such as those specializing in Japanese swordsmanship and polearm fighting.

Shurikenjutsu was considered by most schools to be its final teaching, and was therefore reserved for disciples who had mastered the school's extensive core curriculum.

This exclusivity later led to the near extinction of shurikenjutsu, as the art had been shrouded in secrecy and reserved for only a select few.

Japan's first historically recorded school of shurikenjutsu was the Ganritsu Ryu (c.1625). Like many, this school had a comprehensive curriculum that included kenjutsu, iaijutsu, sojutsu, bojutsu, naginatajutsu, jujutsu and shurikenjutsu.

This school employed a direct-flight method of throwing, known as jiki-daho. In contrast to rotational throwing methods (han-ten/kai-ten) found in China, the jiki-daho method was unique to Japan.

Today, Japan's last remaining specialist school of shurikenjutsu is the Negishi Ryu, which has an aggregated history spanning 4 centuries.

== Usage ==
The use of a concealed throwing weapon allowed for tactical advantages, such as closing the gap or retreating from danger.

These were advanced-level skills, handed down within samurai feudal clans and ninja factions. Shuriken were used tactically and in conjunction with other primary weapons, such as the sword.

== Shuriken ==
The shuriken were slim, needle-like darts that could be easily concealed in the hair (samurai's top-knot).

Generally speaking, shuriken can be divided into 2 general categories:

=== Stick-shuriken ===
Known as Bō-shuriken (棒手裏剣) in Japanese, were modelled on traditional Japanese nails or needles, such as those used to weave and construct the armor of the samurai. Most commonly they were either round or square in shape.

The Negishi Ryu shuriken, which evolved from the original Ganritsu Ryu shuriken, has an 8-sided (octagonal) head. Bo-shuriken were usually single-pointed, as you would expect a nail or a needle to be, but some double-pointed variations did exist.

Bō-shuriken were commonly thrown with the right hand, as samurai always wore their swords on the left. The throwing method employed was either direct-flight, half-spin or full-spin.

Shuriken were launched vertically, horizontally and diagonally, using over or underarm methods.

=== Wheel-shuriken ===
Known as Sha-ken (車剣) in Japanese, were spinning shuriken which had multiple points, or serrated surfaces, such as the well-known Ninja Star. Rotating like wheels, they were easy to throw with precision.

Sha-ken were commonly launched using a pistol grip, and could be thrown vertically, horizontally or diagonally.

== Modern-day forefathers ==
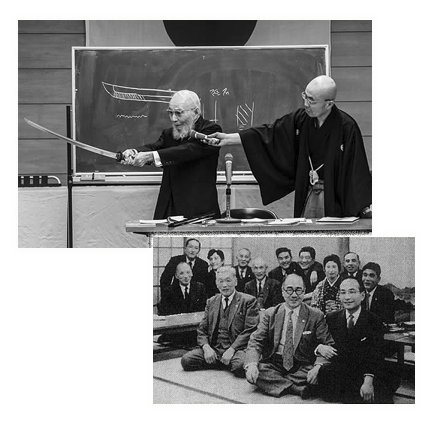
Saito Satoshi with Fujita Seiko and lecturing at the Japan Kobudo Promotion Society.

Following the samurai-era (1868-), authorities such as Naruse Kanji (成瀬関次 / 1888-1948), Fujita Seiko (藤田西湖 / 1899-1966) and Saito Satoshi (齋藤聰 / 1922-2014) continued to teach shurikenjutsu and published books to educate and preserve the ancient tradition.

Naruse Kanji of the Negishi school, wrote the first-ever book on the subject, entitled SHURIKEN in 1943.

Fujita Seiko, known within Japan's kobudo community as the last Koga Ninja, published his book called ZUKAI SHURIKENJUTSU (Illustrated guide to shurikenjutsu) in 1964.

To this day, it remains the go-to publication for shurikenjutsu enthusiasts.

Saito Satoshi of the Negishi school, is credited for bringing Negishi Ryu back to the public spotlight following the turbulence of World War 2.

Saito dedicated his life to shurikenjutsu, working closely with film-studios to accurately portray shurikenjutsu in film & media, heading public demonstrations at major Japanese tournaments for over 60 years, and presiding over the illustrious Japan Kobudo Promotion Society (日本古武道振興会) until his death in 2014.

In 1979, Someya Chikatoshi, a former, disassociated student of Tenshin Shōden Katori Shintō-ryū Kenjutsu, created a new school of shuriken throwing, known as Meifu Shinkage Ryu. This school focuses on target throwing using a small, pencil-like shuriken.

== Popular culture ==
Shurikenjutsu is featured in many martial arts franchises, and is best depicted in the Japanese manga and anime media including Naruto, Bleach, and Sword of the Stranger.

Western media has also tried to incorporate use of Shurinkenjutsu in some of their martial art media drawing heavy Influence from Japanese culture such as Teenage Mutant Ninja Turtles, Power Rangers Ninja Storm, Power Rangers Samurai, Digimon, and Power Rangers Ninja Steel.

Shurikenjutsu is used by Hawkeye in the Marvel Cinematic Universe and Espio the Chameleon in Sonic the Hedgehog.

The DC Comics superhero Batman uses shurikenjutsu when throwing batarangs. This was also done by Batgirl as well as many Robins such as Dick Grayson, Jason Todd, Tim Drake, and Damian Wayne.

== See also ==
- Saitō Satoshi
- Meifu Shinkage-ryū
