= Kōga-ryū =

School of ninjutsu

Kōga-ryū (甲賀流, "School of Kōga") is an umbrella term for a set of traditions of ninjutsu that originated from the region of Kōga (now the city Kōka in Shiga Prefecture). The samurai of Kōga-ryū were known as "Kōga-no-mono", and operated as shinobi throughout Japan's turbulent Sengoku period.

== History ==
The beginnings of the Kōga-ryū may be traced to near the end of the Muromachi period. While the district of Kōga, in Ōmi Province, was under the jurisdiction of the Rokkaku clan, it was a kind of autonomous municipality, composed of localized unions called sō (惣). The Kōka confederacy called itself the Kōka-gun Chūsō (甲賀郡中惣, "General Assembly of Kōka District"). All important decisions in the municipality were made by a majority vote from the union representatives. This kind of system was uncommon for the period in question.

At this time, the leaders of the Rokkaku clan, using Kannonji Castle as a base, started to steadily build up military might. They gave little weight to commands from the Ashikaga shogunate and eventually began to ignore the shogunate altogether. In 1487, General Ashikaga Yoshihisa brought with him an army to stamp out this rebellion, and a battle between Ashikaga and the Rokkaku forces ensued. Ashikaga mobilized daimyōs from several provinces against the castle of Kannonji, the seat of the Rokkaku; as a result, Rokkaku Masayori and his son Rokkaku Takayori were forced to flee to the castle of Kōga. The factual accuracy of their escape is debated; it is likely that they gave up the town to avoid a direct confrontation instead.

Ashikaga then moved his base to Anshiyoji of Kurita District and attacked the castle of Kōga. Kōga fell, but the Rokkaku duo escaped again and ordered the Kōga samurai who followed them to mount a heavy resistance against Ashikaga using guerrilla warfare. Exploiting their geographical advantage in the mountains, the Kōga warriors launched a wide range of surprise attacks against Ashikaga's forces and tormented them by using fire and smoke on Ashikaga's camp during the night. The guerrilla warfare prevented a final showdown, until Ashikaga died in battle in 1489, ending the three-year conflict and sparing the lives of the Rokkaku.

The elusive and effective guerrilla warfare used by the Kōga samurai became well known throughout the whole country. As a result of this victory, the local samurai in the 53 families who participated in this battle were called "the 53 families of Kōga".

The last reported Sōke of Kōga-ryū was 14th headmaster Fujita Seiko (1898–1966). In his autobiography Doronron: Saigo no Ninja (どろんろん最後の忍者 "The last ninja", October 1958), Fujita categorically stated that he had not and would not teach anyone ninjutsu, and would not pass on the school.

The Bugei Ryuha Daijiten, a definitive Encyclopedia of martial arts schools, catalog of Koryū Bujutsu (old schools) and Gendai Budō (new schools) of Japanese martial arts (budō) states that no one knows the teachings of this school today. Few today who state a connection to Koga Ryu can show any evidence to refute this claim, and it is in all likelihood that there are no authentic living traditions practiced today.

== See also ==
- Iga-ryū, umbrella term for another major school of ninjutsu
- Mochizuki Chiyome
- Foreign ninja
