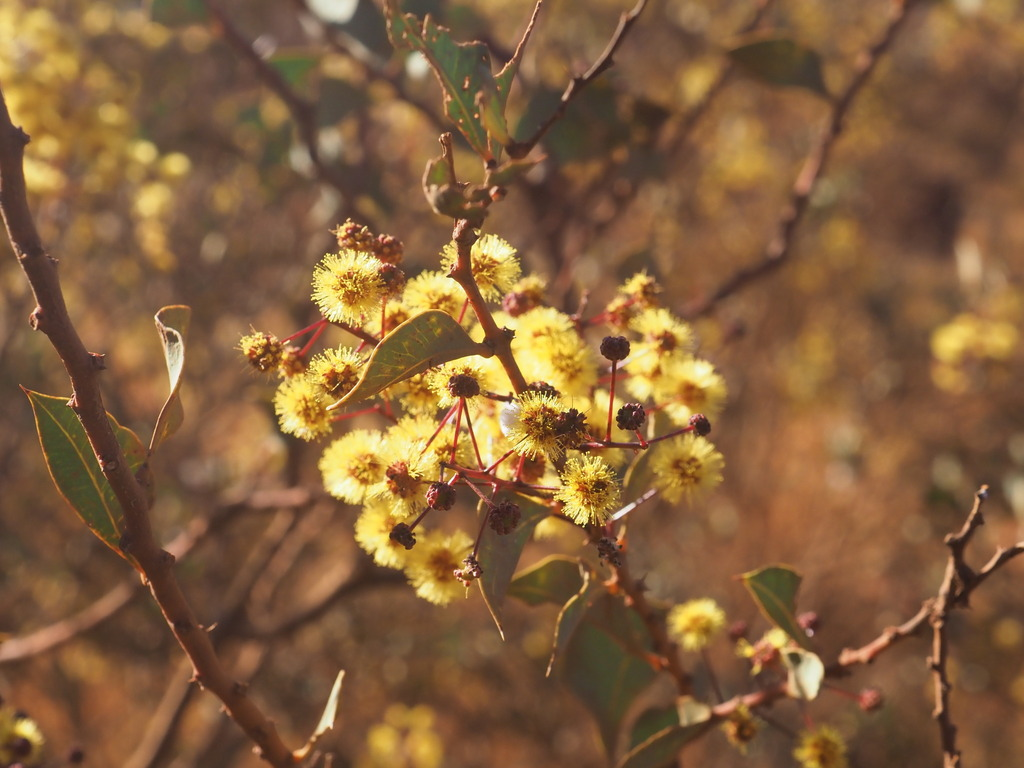
- In the eastern Pilbara

Scientific classification
- Kingdom: Plantae
- Clade: Tracheophytes
- Clade: Angiosperms
- Clade: Eudicots
- Clade: Rosids
- Order: Fabales
- Family: Fabaceae
- Subfamily: Caesalpinioideae
- Clade: Mimosoid clade
- Genus: Acacia
- Species: A. marramamba

Binomial name
- Acacia marramamba Maslin
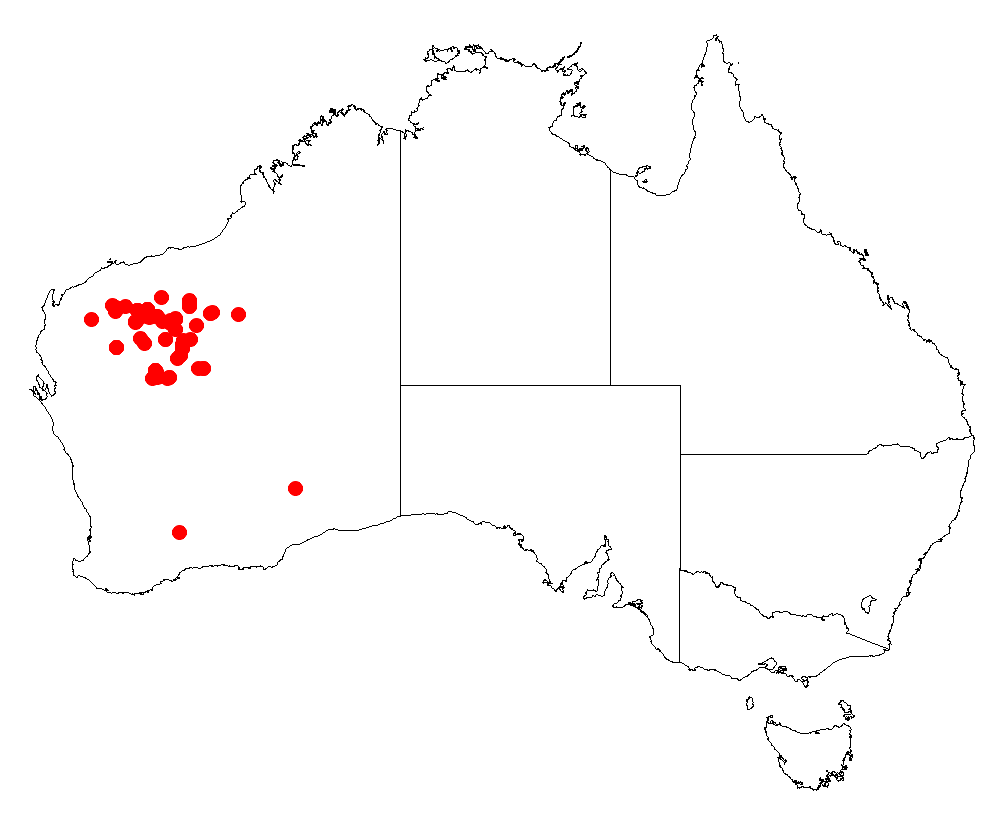

Synonyms
- Racosperma marramamba (Maslin) Pedley

= Acacia marramamba =

Marramamba

Species of legume

Acacia marramamba, commonly known as marramamba, is a species of flowering plant in the family Fabaceae and is endemic to arid parts of Western Australia. It is a shrubby glabrous tree with slightly fissured and fibrous bark near the base of the trunk, sharply pointed elliptic phyllodes with one edge conspicuously rounded and the other edge almost straight, racemes of spherical heads of light- to mid-golden yellow flowers, and narrowly oblong, papery to thinly leathery pods.

== Description ==
Acacia marramamba is a shrubby, glabrous tree that typically grows to a height of 2–3 m (6 ft 7 in – 9 ft 10 in), sometimes to 5 m (16 ft) and has slightly fissured and fibrous bark near the base of the trunk, otherwise smooth. Its branchlets are red, light brown or orange. Its phyllodes are inequilaterally elliptic, with one conspicuously rounded edge and the other almost straight, 20–50 mm (0.79–1.97 in) long, 9–23 mm (0.35–0.91 in) wide, sharply pointed and leathery with a prominent midrib. There are spiny stipules mostly 2–4 mm (0.079–0.157 in) long at the base of the phyllodes but often absent from mature phyllodes. The flowers are borne in racemes 60–150 mm (2.4–5.9 in) long of spherical heads, on peduncles 10–20 mm (0.39–0.79 in), the heads with 25 to 35, light- to mid-golden yellow flowers. Flowering occurs from May to July, and the pods are narrowly oblong, straight to slightly curved, up to 75 mm (3.0 in) long, 7–9 mm (0.28–0.35 in) wide light brown and papery to thinly leathery. The seeds are broadly elliptic to almost round, 4.5–5.0 mm (0.18–0.20 in) long, dull black with a club-shaped aril.

== Taxonomy ==
Acacia marramamba was first formally described in 1982 by Bruce Maslin in the journal Nuytsia from specimens collected on the Marandoo Ridge by Malcolm Trudgen in 1975, on the first ridge south of Mount Bruce in the Hamersley Range. The specific epithet refers "to the Marra Mamba Iron Formation on which the species is frequently found".

== Distribution and habitat ==
Marramamba grows in sandy loam on rocky hills in open scrub or tall open shrubland with Triodia grass cover, in scattered locations in the Pilbara region of north-western Western Australia, from Duck Creek Station and east to Balfour Downs Station and in the adjacent Barlee Range and the upper catchments of the Gascoyne, Ashburton and Murchison Rivers as far south as Mount Fraser, in the Gascoyne, Little Sandy Desert and Pilbara bioregions.

== See also ==
- List of Acacia species
