= Seiko Fujita =

Japanese martial artist

Fujita Seiko
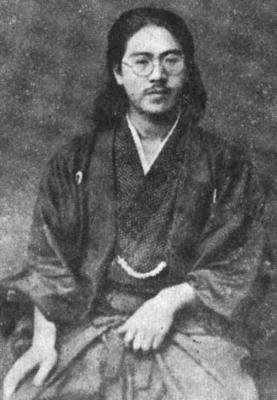
- Born: Fujita Isamu; 10 February 1898; Tokyo or Izu Ōshima
- Died: 4 January 1966 (aged 67)
- Style: Kōga-ryū; Shingetsu-ryū; Nanban Sattō-ryū

Other information
- Notable students: Saitō Satoshi; Iwata Manzo; Inoue Motokatsu; Mabuni Kenei; Ueda Isamu

Seiko Fujita (藤田 西湖, 10 February 1898 – 4 January 1966) was a prominent and highly respected member of Japan's martial arts community. An authority on Kobudō, the classical martial arts of Japan & the Ryukyu Islands, Fujita claimed his grandfather was the 13th headmaster (sōke) of Wada-ha Kōga-ryū Ninjutsu, and that he himself inherited the title as the 14th generation successor; however, some historians cast doubt on the authenticity of this lineage. Academically, he graduated from Nihon University in the department of Religious Studies. From 1922 onwards, Fujita was called upon to lecture at military academies across the country and was program director for ninjutsu studies at the Imperial Army Intelligence Academy (Nakano School / 陸軍中野学校). He compiled a library, the largest of its kind in private hands (now bequeathed to the Odawara City Library), and authored numerous books & instructional manuals.

== Biography ==
Isamu Fujita was born in Tokyo, and studied Kōga-ryū Wada-ha (Ninjutsu) under the tutelage of his grandfather, Fujita Shintazaemon, 13th Soke of the Wada branch of Kōga-ryū Ninjutsu. He was educated at both Waseda and Meiji universities, and initially began his career at a newspaper company. He went on to study several other martial arts and was also noted as an author, researcher and collector of ancient scrolls. According to some references, "opinions are divided if he was a real ninja or a mere budō researcher."

During World War II, Fujita taught Koga Ryu Ninjutsu in the Army Academy of Nakano (Rikugun Nakano Gakkō). Fujita later worked as a government security specialist. In later years he was influential in teaching many traditional Japanese arts. Notable students include Motokatsu Inoue, Mabuni Kenwa, Saito Satoshi, Fujitani Masatoshi, actor Tomisaburo Wakayama and Manzo Iwata, who became heir to some of his styles. Fujita left no official heir for Kōga-ryū Wada Ha.

Seiko Fujita published Zukai Torinawajutsu showing hundreds of hojōjutsu ties from many different schools, and several other texts on ninjutsu and martial arts. He died of cirrhosis of the liver at about the age of 68 and likely suffered from hereditary angioedema (which can preclude the practice of martial arts, although Fujita may have demonstrated the ability to overcome some disease symptoms). His vast collection of books, scrolls and historical documents, the Fujita Seiko Bunko, is housed at the Odawara Library in Kanagawa Prefecture. His collection of historical weapons, tools and attire were bequeathed to the Iga Ryu Ninja Museum in Mie Prefecture.

Notably, after the Second World War, he taught Nanban Sattō-ryū Kenpō (南蛮殺到流拳法) to Kenwa Mabuni, the founder of Shitō-ryū karate.

== Bibliography of the main works ==
Title in Japanese kanji / Transcription of the Japanese title with occidental alphabet / Translation of the Japanese title / Year of publication

- 法術行り方繪解 (in Japanese). 1928. "Hōjutsu Yarikata Etoki", "Illustrated guidance of Budo tricks";
- 忍術秘錄 (in Japanese). 千代天書. 1936. "Ninjutsu hiroku", "Secrets notes about ninjutsu";
- 忍術とは？ (in Japanese). 1938. "Ninjutsu to wa?", "What is Ninjutsu";

Translated into English in 2017 by Eric Shahan.

- 忍術からスパイ戦へ (in Japanese). 1942. « Ninjutsu kara Supai-sen e » « From ninjutsu to spy warfare »
- 神道夢想流杖術圖解 (in Japanese). 1953. "Shintō Musō-ryū Jōjutsu Zukai", "The illustrated technique of the way of the short staff from Shintō Musō-ryū »
- どろんろん最後の忍者 (in Japanese). October 1958. "Doronron : Saigo no Ninja", "The last ninja"
- 拳法極意當身殺活法明解 (in Japanese). 1958., "Kenpō Gokui Atemi Satsu-Kappō Meikai", "The technique of strike the vital points from the Kenpō for kill or revive"

In 1972, a big part of this book has been translated in French by Jacques Devêvre, and published by the editions « Judo international », with the title : « Les points vitaux secrets du corps humain » (« The secret vital points of the human body »), then re-published in 1998, by « Budo editions », with the title : « L’art ultime et sublime des points vitaux » (« The magnificent and ultimate art of the vital points ») (with commentaries by Henry Plée)

- 図解 手裏剣術 (in Japanese). June 1964. "Zukai Shurikenjutsu", "The illustrated technique of the shuriken"
- 図解 捕縄術 (in Japanese). Autumn 1964. "Zukai Hojōjutsu" / "Zukai Torinawajutsu", "The illustrated technique of the binding rope"
