= Kanji, Tamil Nadu =

Kanji
- Town Panchayat
- Location in Tamil Nadu, India Kanji (India)
- Coordinates: 12.382°N 78.964°E
- Country: India
- State: Tamil Nadu
- District: Tiruvanamalai
- Founder: karthick govindraj
- Elevation: 121 m (397 ft)

Population (2001)
  - Total: 8,084

Languages
  - Official: Tamil
- Time zone: UTC+5:30 (IST)

Kanji alias Kanchi is a town in Chengam taluk in Tiruvanamalai district, Tamil Nadu, India. Its population in the 2011 census was 5,873. It is located 23 km away from north-west of the temple town of Tiruvannaamalai, at an elevation of 121m above sea level.

== Economy ==
Some of the business units and small scale industries in Kanji are rice mills, garment manufacturing, shoe companies and hand-looms.

== Landmarks ==
It has a temple devoted to Lord Murugan as well as the Karaikandeswarar temple.

== Education ==
=== Schools ===
- St. Antony's school
- Good Heart primary school
- Kamalambal primary school
- Government boys hr.sec school
- Government girls hr.sec school
- Government elementary school
- RCM Primary School

=== College ===
- Annai Terasa Nursery Training College
- Vivekanandha Art School
- SRS Academy

=== Other ===
A craft centre and Shanthi Lumin children's home are supported by foreign charities including the British charity The Kanji Project.
