= Ambula (food) =

Dried mango dish from Odisha, India

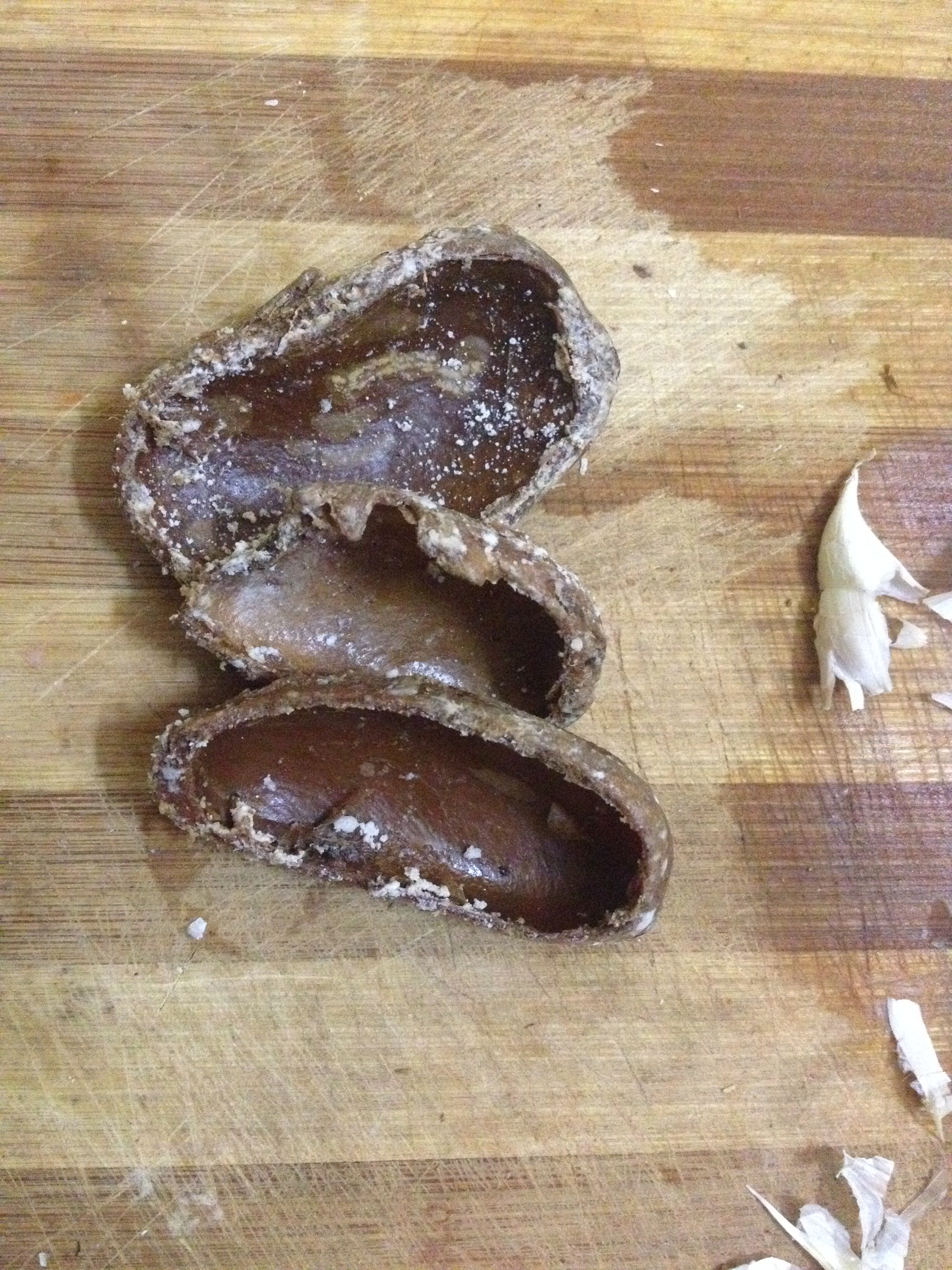
Pieces of ambula

Ambula (Odia: ଆମ୍ବୁଲ) is a sundried mango dish originating from Odisha. It is sweet and sour in taste. Ambula is used to sour curries like kanji. It can be prepared with red or green chili, garlic and water and can be served with "pakhala".

== Preparation ==
Ambula is made from sour mangoes. First, the skin of the mango is removed. The mango is then mixed with salt and dried in the sunlight for several days. Ambula may be used in various curries, such as fish and okra, to add flavor.
