= Hospitality industry =

Hoteliers, travel agents, restaurateurs, barkeeps and their employees

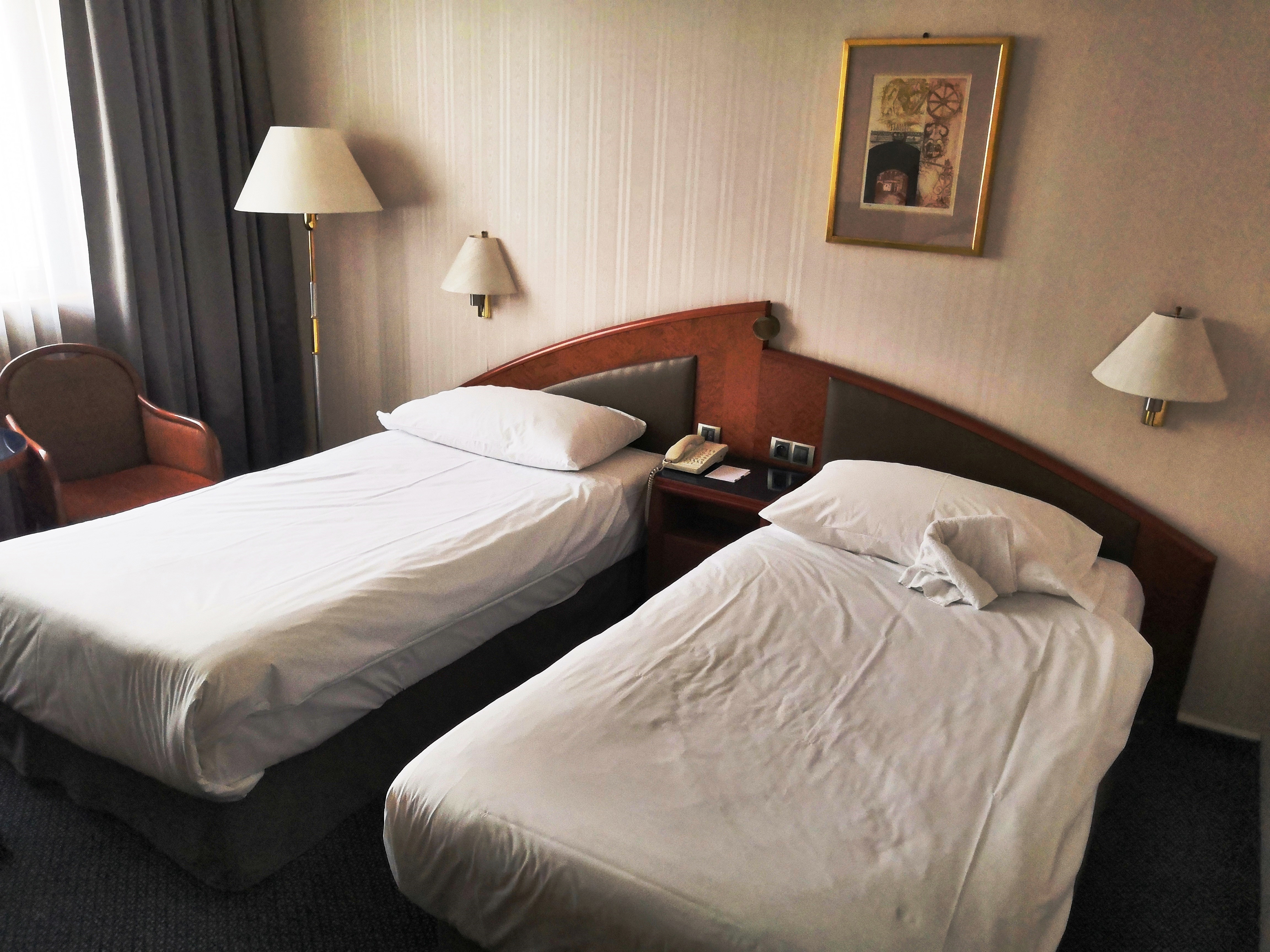
Guest room of the Panorama Hotel in Prague, Czechia in 2021

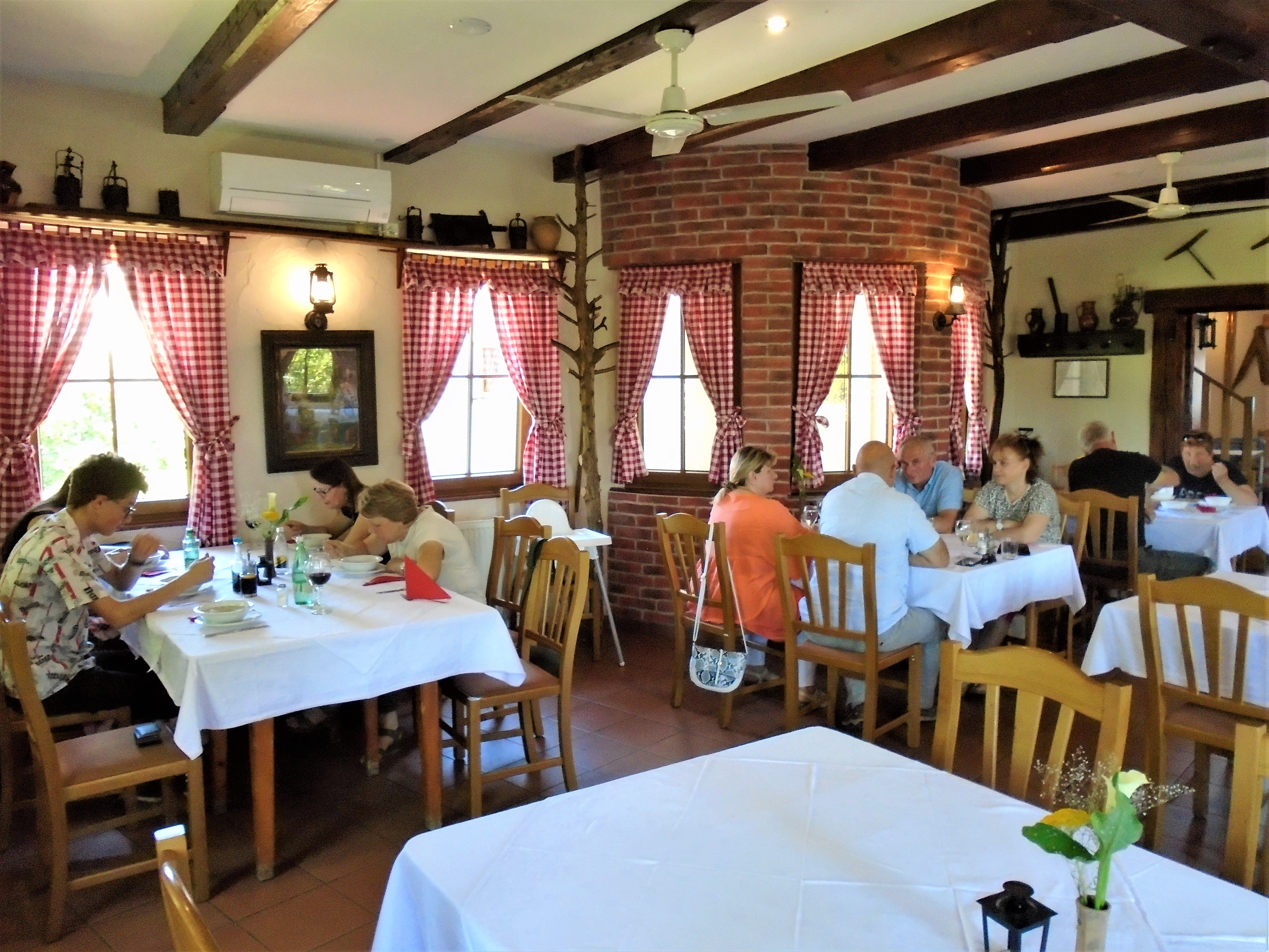
Traditional restaurant of the Potrti Kotač in Jurovčak, Međimurje County, Croatia in 2022

The hospitality industry is a broad category of fields within the service industry that includes lodging, food and beverage services, event planning, theme parks, water parks, travel agency, tourism, hotels, casinos, real estate, restaurants, nightclubs, and bars.

== Sectors ==
According to the Cambridge Business English Dictionary the "hospitality industry" consists of hotels and food service, equivalent to NAICS code 72, "Accommodation and Food Service".

=== Definition in the United States ===
In 2020, the United States Department of Labor Standard Industrial Classification (SIC) defines the hospitality industry more broadly, including:

- 701 Hotels and Motels, including auto courts, bed and breakfast inns, cabins and cottages, casino hotels, hostels, hotels (except residential ones), inns furnishing food and lodging, motels, recreational hotels, resort hotels, seasonal hotels, ski lodges and resorts, tourist cabins and tourist courts
- 704 Organization Hotels and Lodging Houses, On a Membership Basis
- 58 Eating and Drinking Places (cf. U.S. "food service industry", U.K. "catering industry")
  - 5812 Eating Places, including restaurants (among which carry-out restaurants, drive-in restaurants and fast food restaurants), automats, beaneries, box lunch stands, buffets, cafés, cafeterias, caterers, coffee shops, commissary restaurants a.k.a. canteens, concession stands, dhaba, military hotel prepared food (e.g., in airports and sports arenas), contract feeding, dairy bars, diners, dining rooms, dinner theaters, food bars, frozen custard stands, grills, hamburger stands, hot dog stands, ice cream stands, industrial feeding, institutional food service such as that aboard airplanes, railroads, and ships), lunch bars, lunch counters, luncheonettes, lunchrooms, oyster bars, pizza parlors and pizzerias, refreshment stands, sandwich bars or shops, snack shops, soda fountains, soft drink stands, submarine sandwich shops, and tearooms. Sources other than the SIC also mention other formats of eating places such as cyber cafés, ramen shops a.k.a. noodle bars, and sushi bars.
  - 5813 Drinking Places (alcoholic beverages) including bars, beer gardens/parlors/taverns, sale of beer, wine, and liquors for on-premise consumption, bottle clubs, cabarets, cocktail lounges, discotheques, drinking places, nightclubs, saloons, taprooms, taverns, and wine bars
- 472 Arrangement of Passenger Transportation
  - 4724 Travel Agencies
  - 4725 Tour Operators
  - 4729 Arrangement of Passenger Transportation, Not Elsewhere Classified, such as ticket offices not operated by transportation companies, and services that arrange carpools

In the United States, hotels are the most popular. In 2022, the hotel and motel industry in the United States was a $224.9 billion market, measured by revenue.

=== Definition in Dutch, Italian and French ===
Horeca (also HoReCa, HORECA) is the Dutch, Indonesian, German, Italian, Romanian, Portuguese and French term for the food service and hotel industries. The term is a syllabic abbreviation of the words hotel/restaurant/café. The term is mostly used in the Benelux countries, Indonesia, and Switzerland.

"Horeca" is often not a one-to-one equivalent to the term "hospitality industry" used in English, which is often used more broadly. According to the Cambridge Business English Dictionary the "hospitality industry" consists of hotels and food service, equivalent to NAICS code 72, "Accommodation and Food Service". However, the United States Department of Labor Standard Industry Classification (SIC) defines the hospitality industry more broadly, as noted above.

The Dutch Uniforme Voorwaarden Horeca (UVH) is translated into English as Uniform Conditions for the Hotel and Catering Industry. This code covers hotels, bars, restaurants and related businesses in the Netherlands. Koninklijke Horeca Nederland is the Dutch trade association for the hotel and catering industry.

This sector is one of the fastest growing in Europe. In 2004, more than 7.8 million people were employed and the sector generated more than $338 billion in turnover. Jobs tend to be temporary, with irregular hours, low pay, and few career prospects. There is a high proportion of young people working in the sector. Some distribution companies use this term to define the food & beverage service trade channel or the hospitality trade.

== Impact of the COVID‑19 Pandemic ==
The COVID‑19 pandemic profoundly disrupted the hospitality industry, exposing its vulnerability to global crises. Hotels, restaurants, bars, and travel services experienced abrupt closures, reduced occupancy, and strict hygiene regulations, resulting in significant revenue losses and temporary layoffs. Research on adaptive legal literacy during the pandemic highlights that managers who successfully navigated this period relied on the ability to quickly interpret and apply shifting public health directives, labor laws, and safety regulations. This competency enabled hospitality professionals to implement effective hygiene protocols, manage workforce challenges, and maintain customer trust while complying with evolving governmental mandates. The experience underscored the importance of legal awareness, crisis management, and operational adaptability in sustaining resilience across lodging, food and beverage services, and other hospitality sectors.

== Technology ==
Hospitality operations rely on several categories of specialized software. The property management system (PMS) serves as the central operational platform for lodging properties, handling reservations, room assignment, guest check-in and check-out, housekeeping status, and guest billing. Historically installed on premises, PMS platforms have increasingly migrated to cloud-based delivery, reducing on-property information technology infrastructure and enabling centralized management across multi-property portfolios.

Revenue management systems apply demand forecasting and pricing algorithms to set room rates dynamically. The discipline originated in the airline industry following deregulation in the United States and was subsequently adopted by hotel chains beginning in the 1980s.

Distribution technology connects properties to booking channels. A central reservation system manages rate and inventory data, while a channel manager distributes that data to online travel agencies, global distribution systems, and a property's own booking engine.

Additional operational systems include point of sale platforms for food and beverage outlets, labor management and scheduling software, and business intelligence tools that consolidate data across these systems for performance reporting.

== By country ==
=== India ===
The hotel industry in India is poised for continued strong growth, with CareEdge Ratings forecasting a 9-11% year-over-year increase in revenue for hotels in FY25. This comes after an estimated 12-14% growth in RevPAR (revenue per available room) in FY24, driven by robust demand outpacing supply. Average room rates across India are projected to rise from around ₹7,200-7,400 in FY24 to ₹7,700-7,900 in FY25, with RevPAR climbing to an average of ₹4,800-5,000 by end-FY24. The recovery is fueled by healthy domestic leisure and business travel demand, complemented by increasing foreign tourist arrivals. While new supply is expected at a 4-5% CAGR over 4–5 years adding over 50,000 branded rooms, this delayed catch-up will allow demand-supply dynamics to gradually align. The CareEdge report notes a better balance emerging across segments like upscale, upper midscale and midscale/economy, reducing the earlier concentration in luxury/upper upscale. With high occupancies of 68-70% forecast for FY25, the strong RevPAR growth should aid in improving the credit profile of industry players.

=== United Kingdom ===
In 2015 the United Kingdom hospitality industry employed around 2.9m people – around 9% of the UK workforce. By employment, it is the UK's fourth-largest industry. The most jobs in the industry are found in London (around 500,000) and South East England (around 400,000); 18% of workers in the UK industry are in London. There are around 1.5m restaurant workers, and around 0.5m work in hotels. The Food Safety Act 1990 introduced the training that staff have to follow. Around 25% of the hospitality workforce comes from the EU, making up around 25% of chefs and around 75% of waiting staff. In 2019, 1 in 50 applicants to Pret a Manger was British.

=== Vietnam ===
The hotel industry in Vietnam is an important economic sector, contributing significantly to the country's GDP. According to statistics from the Vietnam National Administration of Tourism, in 2022, Vietnam had a total of 32,313 accommodation establishments with 611,352 rooms, including 1,576 hotels with three stars or higher with 334,487 rooms. Despite this, the Vietnamese hotel industry is still considered to have great potential for development in the future. According to the forecast of the World Tourism Organization (UNWTO), Vietnam will be one of the top tourist destinations in the world in the coming years. This will create opportunities for the development of the Vietnamese hotel industry. According to statistics from the Vietnam National Administration of Tourism, the Vietnamese hotel industry has had an average growth rate of 15% per year in the period 2010–2022.

== See also ==
- American Hotel & Lodging Educational Institute
- Customer service
- Destination marketing organization
- Gastronomy
- Hospitality
- Hotel manager
- Leisure industry
