= Varieties of biryani =

Rice-based dishes

Biryani is a mixed rice dish originating in the contact between delicate Persian pilau and spicy Indian cuisine under the Mughal emperors. It is made with rice, meat, onions, garlic, yoghurt, and spices. There are many varieties of biryani, both in the Indian subcontinent and in countries around the world.

== On the Indian subcontinent ==
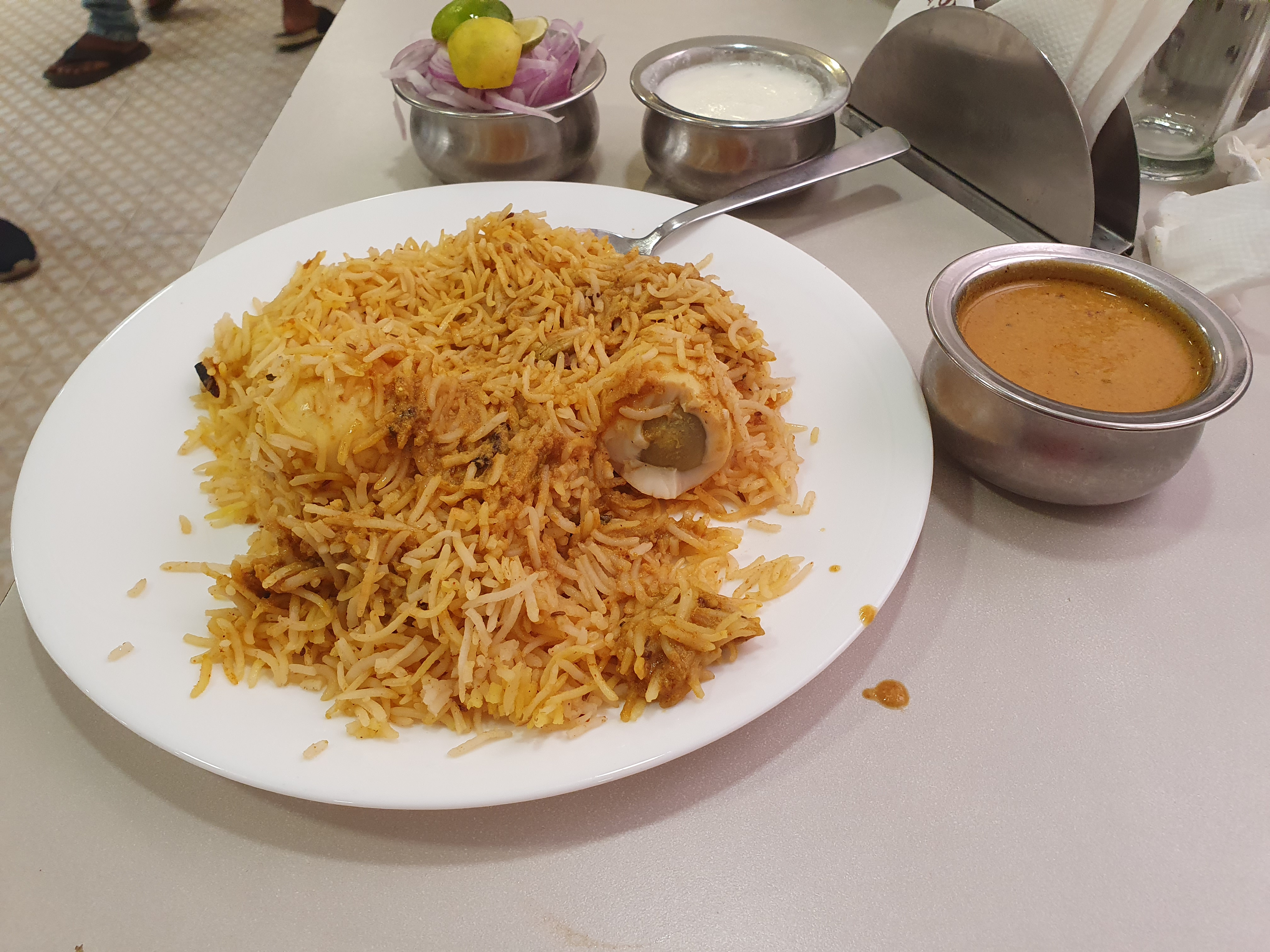
Hyderabadi egg biryani served with mirchi ka salan, raita and salad

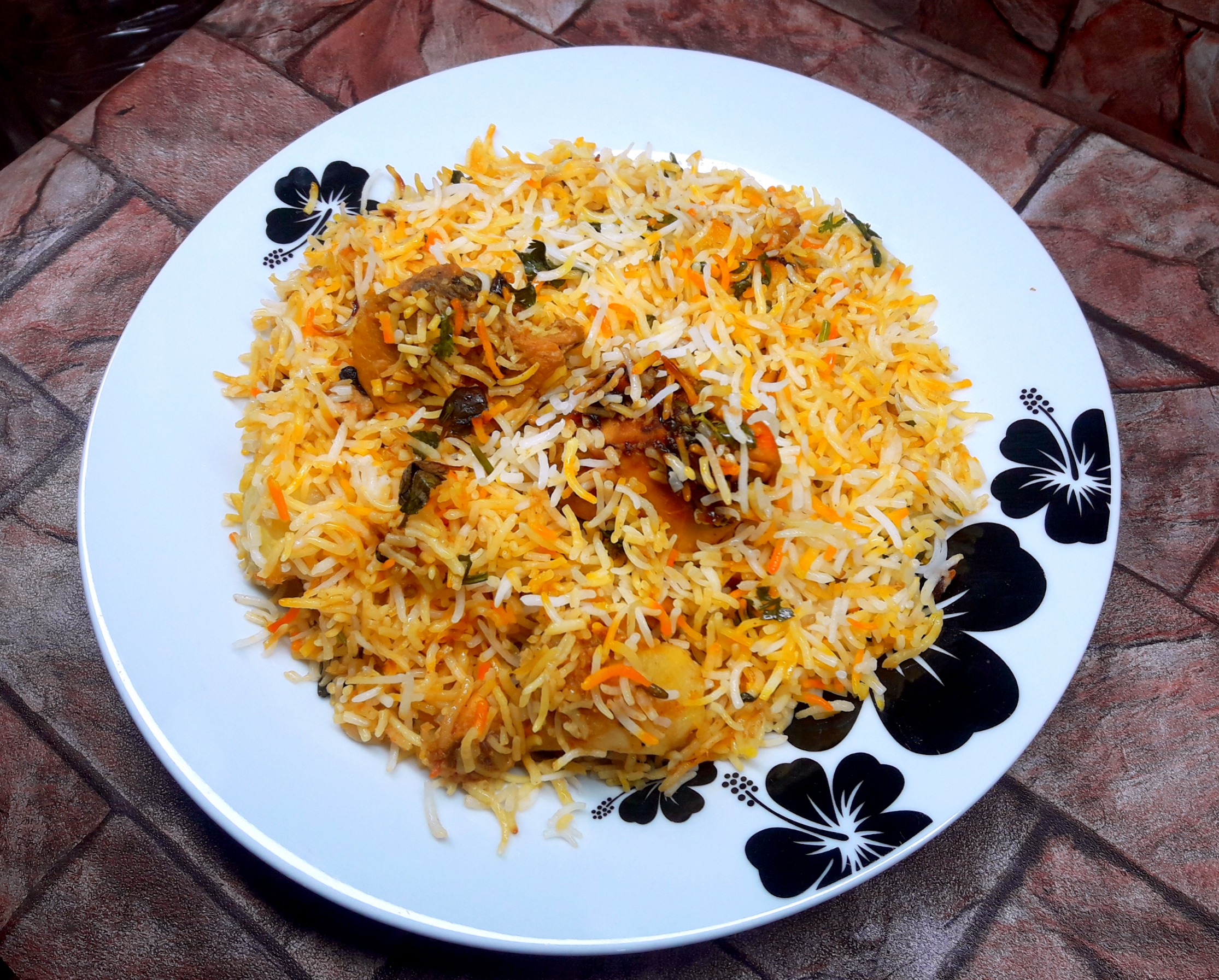
Biryani of Lahore

There are many types of biryani, whose names are often based on their region of origin. For example, Sindhi biryani developed in the Sindh region of what is now Pakistan, and Hyderabadi biryani developed in the city of Hyderabad in South India.

Some have taken the name of the shop that sells it, for example: Haji Biriyani, Haji Nanna Biriyani in Old Dhaka, Fakhruddin Biriyani in Dhaka, Students biryani in Karachi, Lucky biryani in Bandra, Mumbai and Baghdadi biryani in Colaba, Mumbai. Biryanis are often specific to the Muslim communities where they originate; they are usually the defining dishes of those communities.

=== Ambur/Vaniyambadi biryani ===
Ambur/Vaniyambadi biryani is a variety cooked in the neighboring towns of Ambur and Vaniyambadi in the Tirupattur district of the northeastern part of Tamil Nadu, which houses a high Muslim population. It was introduced during the time of the Nawabs of Arcot who once ruled the area. It is typically made with jeera samba rice. Nowadays, it is popular as both Ambur or Vaniyambadi style biryani as those are two prominent towns along the popular Bangalore to Chennai highway, where travellers are known to stop for eating.

The Ambur/Vaniyambadi biryani is often accompanied by dhalcha, a sour brinjal curry, and pachadi or raitha (sliced onions mixed with plain yogurt, tomato, chilies, and salt). The usage of spice is moderate, and curd is used as a gravy base. It has a higher ratio of meat to rice.

=== Bhatkali/Navayathi biryani ===
This is an integral part of the Navayath cuisine and a specialty of Bhatkal, a coastal town in Karnataka. Its origins are traced to the Persian traders who introduced biryani along with kababs and Indian breads. In Bhatkali biryani, the meat is cooked in an onion and green chili-based masala and layered with fragrant rice. It has a spicy flavour, and the rice is white with mild streaks of orange. Its variations include beef, goat, chicken, titar (partridge), egg, fish, crab, prawn, and vegetable biryani. A few chilies and spices with curry leaves add flavour to the dish. No oil is used.

Another variety common among the Navayath uses rice vermicelli in place of rice, lending this biryani the name shayya or shayyo. Like many other recipes, the meat, typically chicken, is first cooked with spices and yoghurt, with the vermicelli and fried onions added later.

=== Bohri biryani ===
This biryani, traditionally made by the Bohri community, is one with a rich history. The Bohris, originally from Yemen, migrated mainly to Gujarat and other parts of India between the 11th and 13th centuries. As a result, the dish incorporates both Yemeni and Gujarati influences. The recipe is typically standard and can vary, although its signature ingredients include crispy potatoes along with even more tomatoes and onions. It is seemingly also a dish in Pakistan.

=== Chettinad biryani ===
Chettinad biryani is famous in the Indian state of Tamil Nadu. It is mostly made using jeera samba rice, and is known to have a distinct aroma of spices and ghee. This biryani is usually paired with nenju elumbu kuzhambu, a spicy and tangy goat meat gravy. The podi kozhi is usually topped with fried onions and curry leaves.

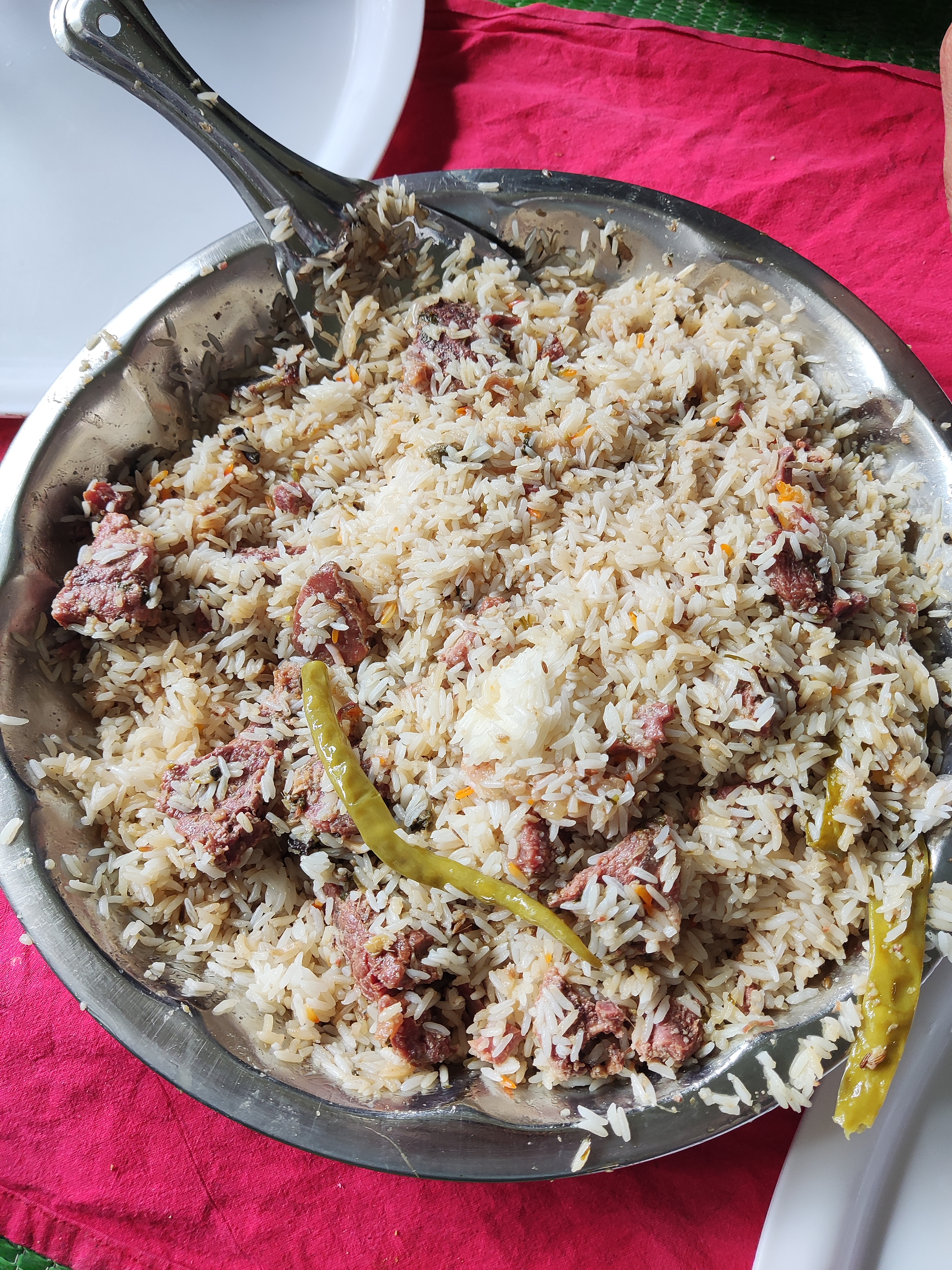
Degh biryani, as served in Parbhani District and surroundings

=== Delhi biryani ===
Among the styles of biryani in Delhi, Nizamuddin biryani usually had little expensive meat and spices as it was primarily meant to be made in bulk for offering at the Nizamuddin Dargah shrine and thereafter to be distributed to devotees. A non-dum biryani, using many green chillies, popularized by the Babu Shahi Bawarchi shops located outside the National Sports Club in Delhi, is informally called Babu Shahi biryani. Another version of Delhi biryani uses achaar (pickles) and is called achaari biryani.

=== Dhakaiya biryani ===
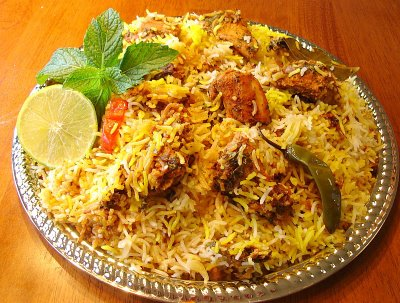
Bengali mutton biryani is known as Dhaka kacchi biriyani

The city of Dhaka in Bangladesh is known for Dhakaiya kacchi biryani, a chevon biryani made with highly seasoned rice and goat meat. The recipe includes highly seasoned rice, goat meat, mustard oil, garlic, onion, black pepper, saffron, clove, cardamom, cinnamon, salt, lemon, doi, peanuts, cream, raisins and a small amount of cheese (either from cows or buffalo). It is accompanied by borhani, a salted mint drink made of yogurt, coriander, mint and salt.

Haji biryani is a favourite among Bangladeshis living abroad. A recipe was handed down by the founder of one Dhaka restaurant to the next generation. Haji Mohammad Shahed claimed, "I have never changed anything, not even the amount of salt".

=== Dindigul biryani ===
The city of Dindigul in Tamil Nadu is noted for its biryani, which uses a little curd and lemon juice for a tangy taste.

=== Donne biryani ===
According to some historians, this biryani is believed to have originated many centuries ago, although the purported origins are numerous and disputed. One historical account states that in 1638, Shahaji Bhosale of the Maratha Empire achieved his conquest of Bangalore in Karnataka, and his descendants set up and ran these new establishments called "military hotels".

Today, the military hotels of Bangalore are well known for selling biryani served in dried leaf bowls called donne in Kannada. Like many other biryani varieties in South India, it uses the standard short-grain seeraga samba rice. Along with yogurt and spices, it contains a gravy, mainly composed of mint, coriander leaves and green chillies, that gives the biryani its signature green colour. To impart a specific taste, the recipe for this biryani usually includes either kapok buds (known as Marathi moggu) or stone flowers as additional spices. The choice of meat can be either chicken or mutton.

=== Hyderabadi biryani ===
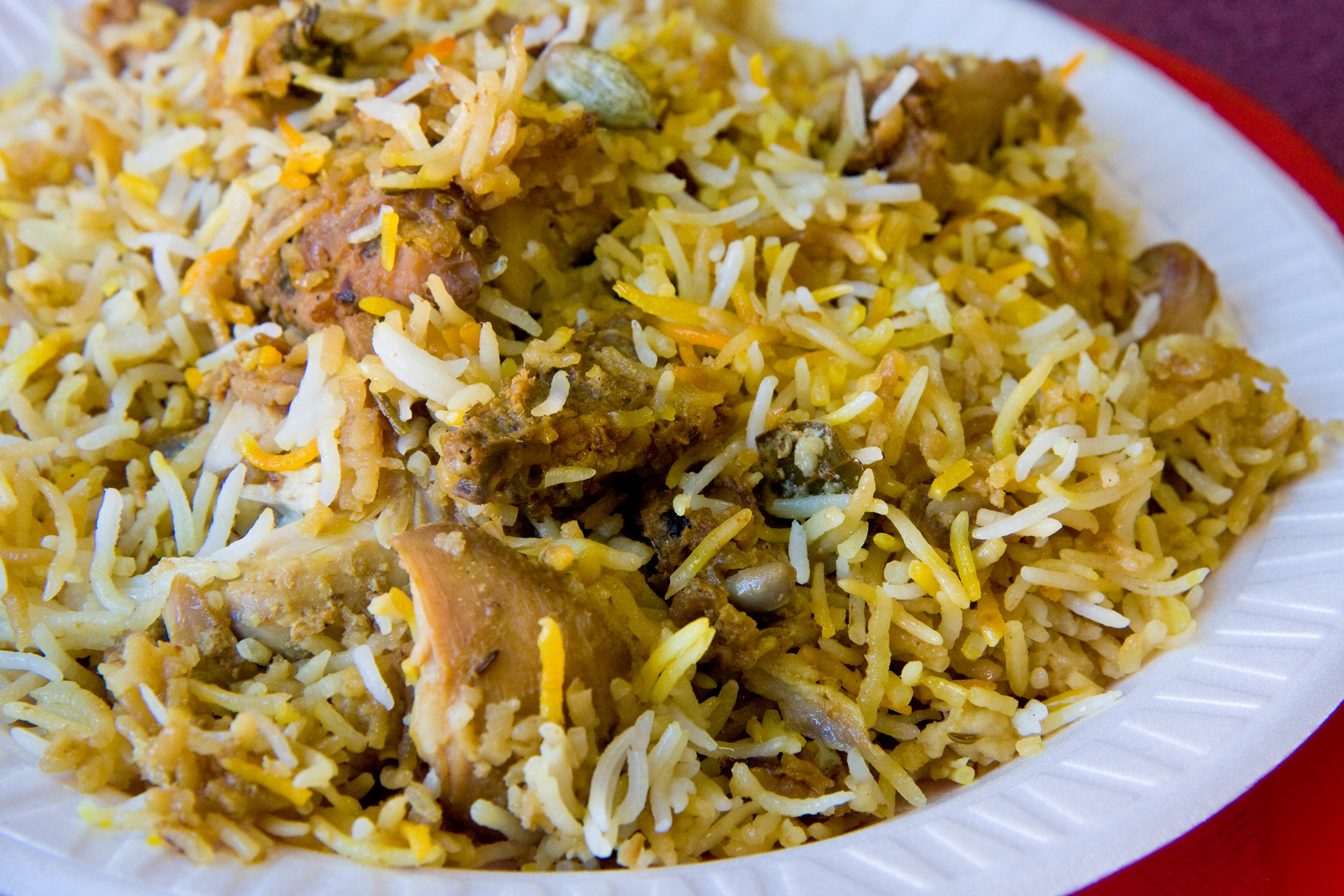
Hyderabadi chicken biryani

Hyderabadi biryani is India's most famous biryani; some say biryani is synonymous with Hyderabad. Hyderabadi biryani developed in Hyderabad Subah under the rule of Asaf Jah I, who was first appointed as the governor of Deccan by the Mughal Emperor Aurangzeb. It is made with basmati rice, spices and goat meat. Popular variations use chicken instead of goat meat. There are various forms of Hyderabadi biryani, such as kachay gosht ki biryani or dum biryani, where goat meat is marinated and cooked along with the rice. It is left on a slow fire or dum for a fragrant and aromatic flavour.

=== Kutchi/Memoni biryani ===
Memoni or Kutchi biryani is an extremely spicy variety developed by the Memons, who are natives to the Gujarat and Sindh regions in India and Pakistan. Memon biryani is also referred to as akhni, which is typically beef or mutton and is often served with cut onions.

=== Kalyani biryani ===
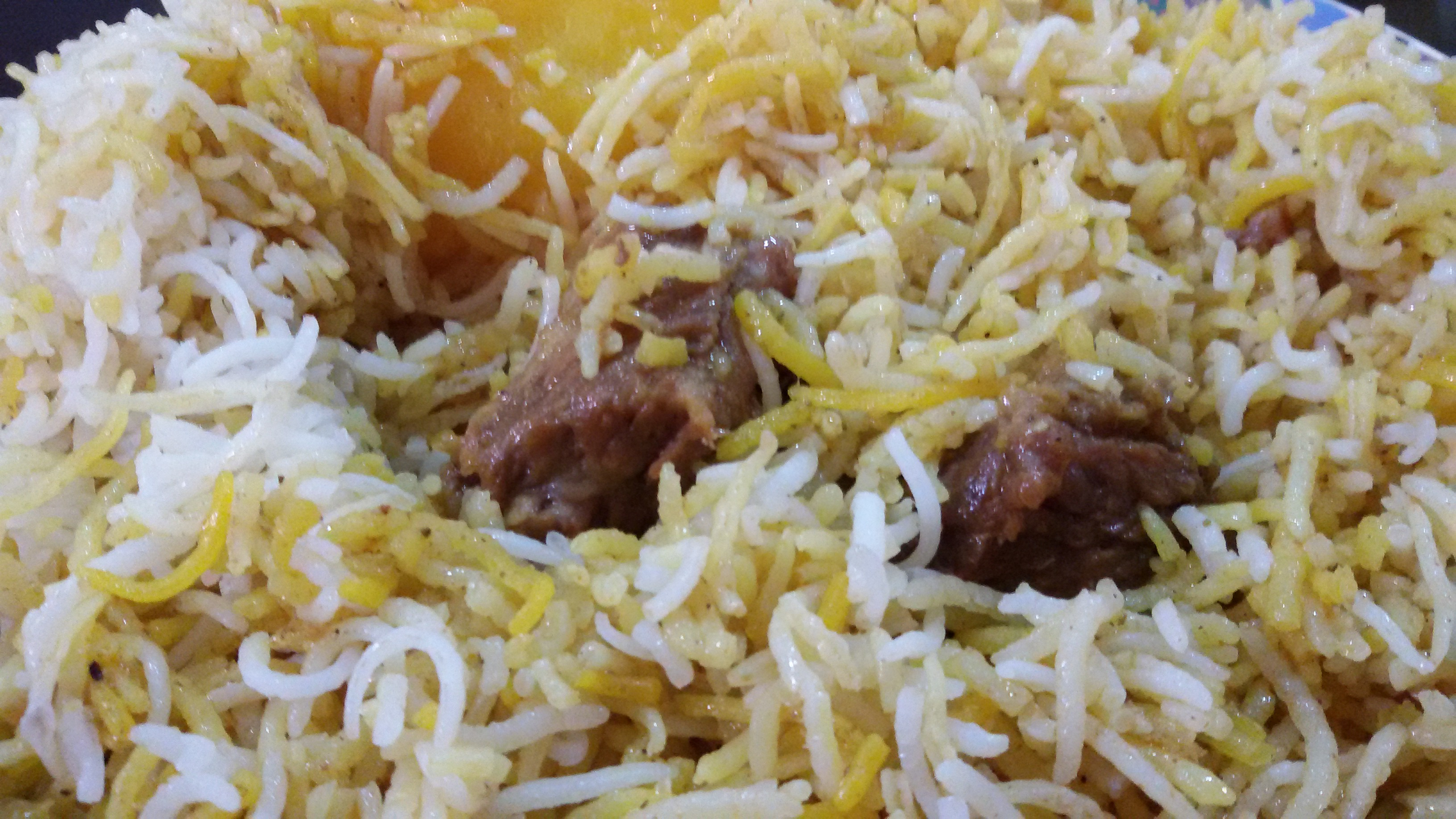
Beef biryani

Kalyani biryani is a beef biryani from the former state of Hyderabad Deccan. Also known as the "poor man's" Hyderabadi biryani, Kalyani biryani is made from small cubes of buffalo meat or cow meat.

The meat is flavoured with ginger, garlic, turmeric, red chili, cumin, coriander powder, and considerable amounts of onion and tomato. It is first cooked in a thick curry and then cooked along with rice. It is then cooked dum-style (the Indian method of steaming in a covered pot). It has a distinct flavour of tomatoes, jeera and dhania.

Kalyani biryani is supposed to have originated in Bidar during the reign of the Kalyani Nawabs, who migrated to Hyderabad in the mid-18th century after one of the Nawabs, Ghazanfur Jang, married into the Asaf Jahi family and united their realms. Kalyani biryani was served by the Kalyani Nawabs to all of their subjects who came from Bidar to Hyderabad and stayed or visited their devdi or noble mansion.

=== Kizhi biryani ===
This variant of biryani is well known in the state of Kerala, and gets its name from the method by which it is prepared. The recipe is considerably different from many others due to its preparation and assemblage. The meat can typically be chicken, fish or chemmeen (prawns), depending on the region. Unlike other methods, the meat is marinated in spices and lemon juice and cooked separately, as are the rice and gravy. Coconut milk is used as a signature ingredient to enrich the texture.

The easily distinguishable aspect of this biryani is in its serving. A banana leaf is cut in half and tempered, and the meat, rice and gravy are all placed together in a particular fashion on its surface, involving some herbs and birista (fried onions). Additional accompaniments may include eggs and coconut chutney. After assembly, the biryani is wrapped within the leaf and steamed. Due to the manner in which it is cooked and served, this is most likely ideal to be consumed by only one person.

=== Kolkata biryani ===
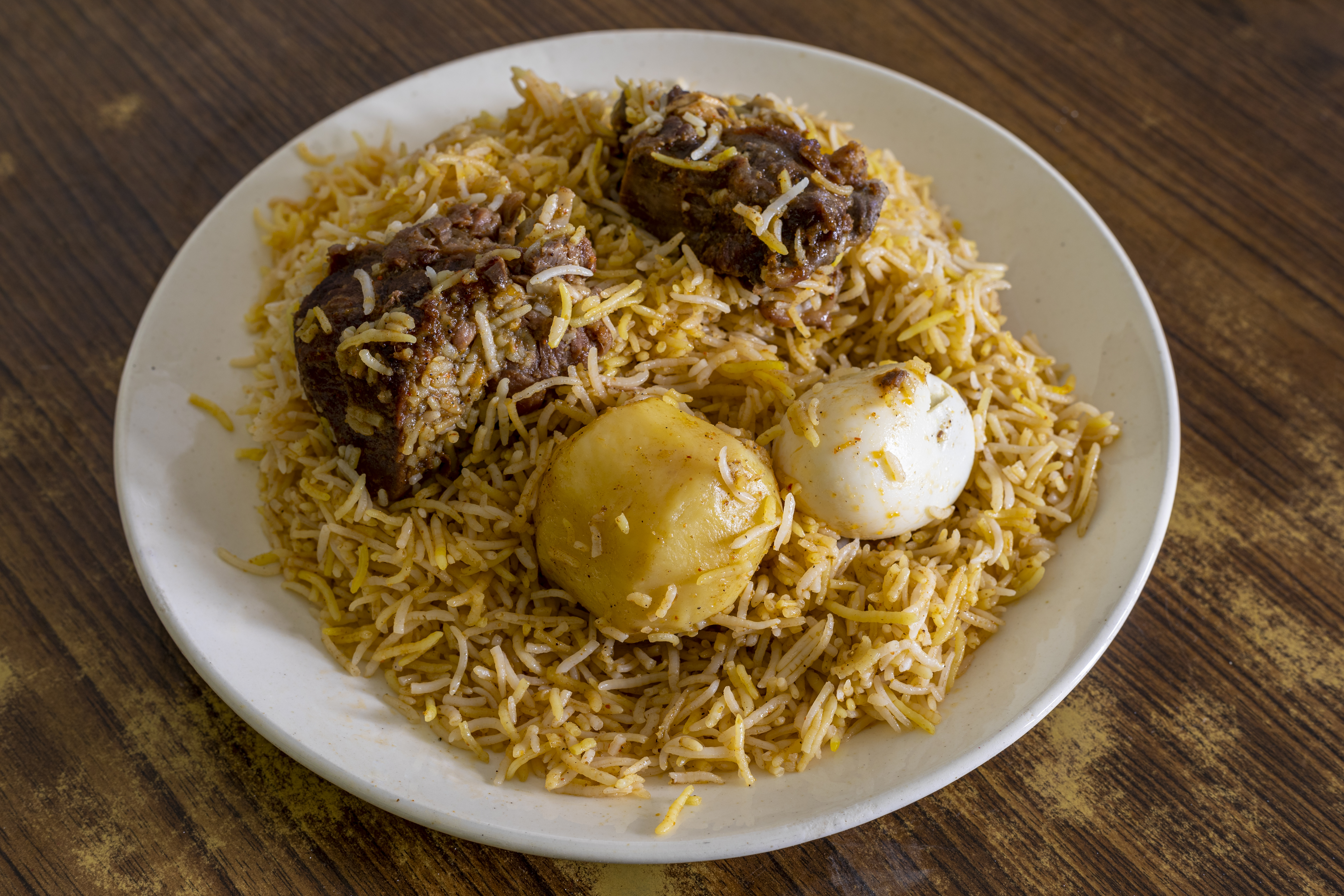
Kolkata biryani

Calcutta or Kolkata biryani evolved from Lucknow-style biryani when Awadh's last Nawab, Wajid Ali Shah, was exiled in 1856 to the Kolkata suburb of Metiabruz. Shah brought his personal chef with him. Like Dhakaiya biryani, Kolkata biryani is characterized by the presence of potatoes.

=== Lucknow biryani ===
Lucknow was a capital of Awadh Subah. For Lucknow, or Awadhi, biryani, basmati rice is cooked in ghee with warm, aromatic spices and then layered with a type of meat curry or marinade, sealed, and cooked over low heat until done.

=== MLA Potlam biryani ===
This viral style of biryani traces its origins to "The Spicy Venue" restaurant in Hyderabad. The recipe is unique and easily distinguishable from every other biryani by appearance. It is composed of a mutton keema and prawn biryani wrapped inside an omurice-style seasoned omelette.

=== Sindhi biryani ===
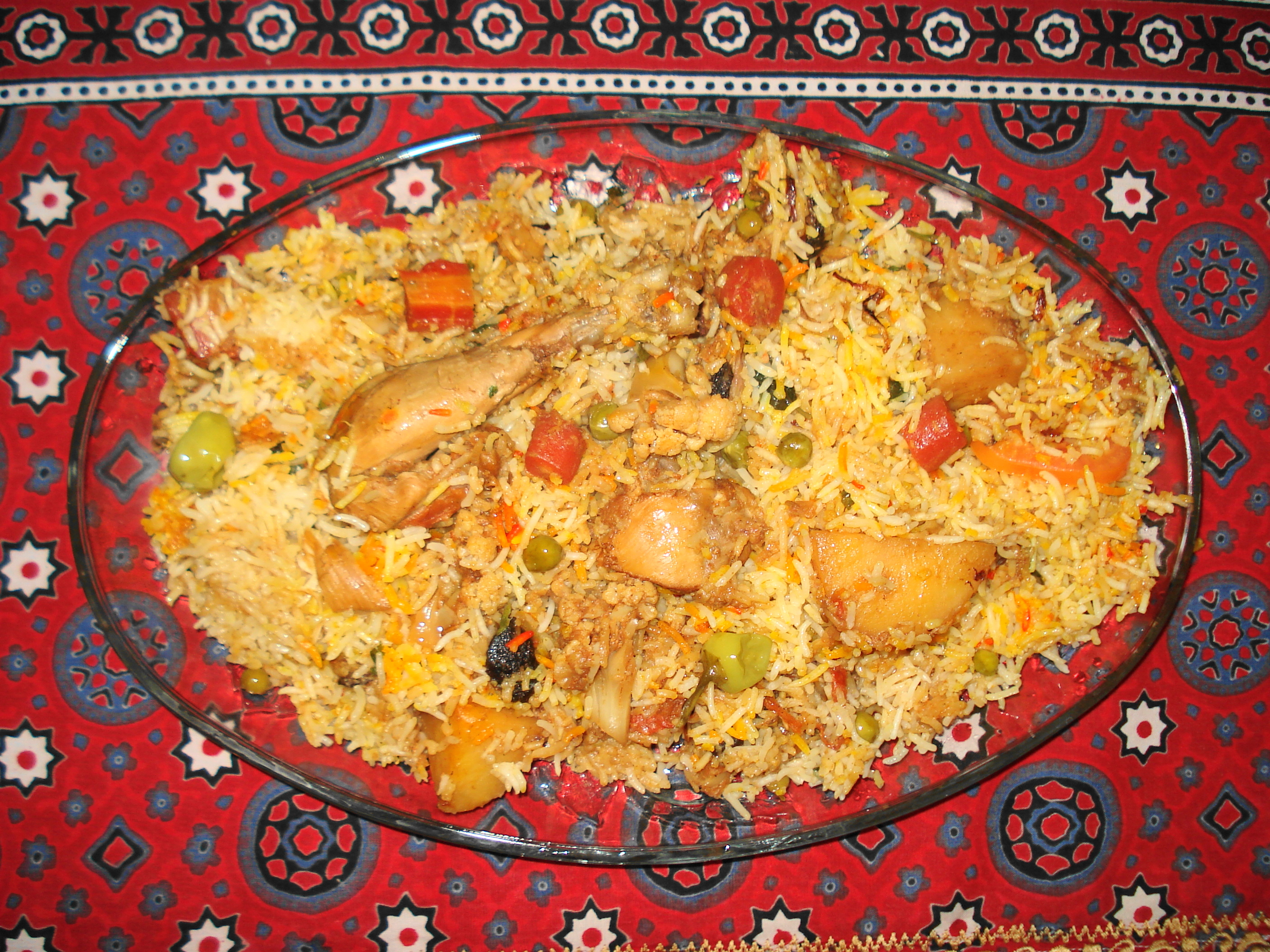
Sindhi biryani

The exotic and aromatic Sindhi biryani, originating in the former Mughal subah based in Thatta, is distinguished by its frequent inclusion of potatoes and tomatoes in addition to its spicy taste, fragrant rice, and delicate meat.

=== Sofiyani biryani ===
Also known as safeeda biryani, this variant of biryani is another with Hyderabadi origins. It was said to have been created for a Nizam who was very fond of biryani but was unable to digest spices. Today, the recipe mainly involves khoya and almond paste as a base along with meat and many other ingredients, with no trace of red chillies or chilli powder, which leads to the so-called "white" look of this dish. Green chillies may be used as an alternative.

=== Thalassery biryani ===
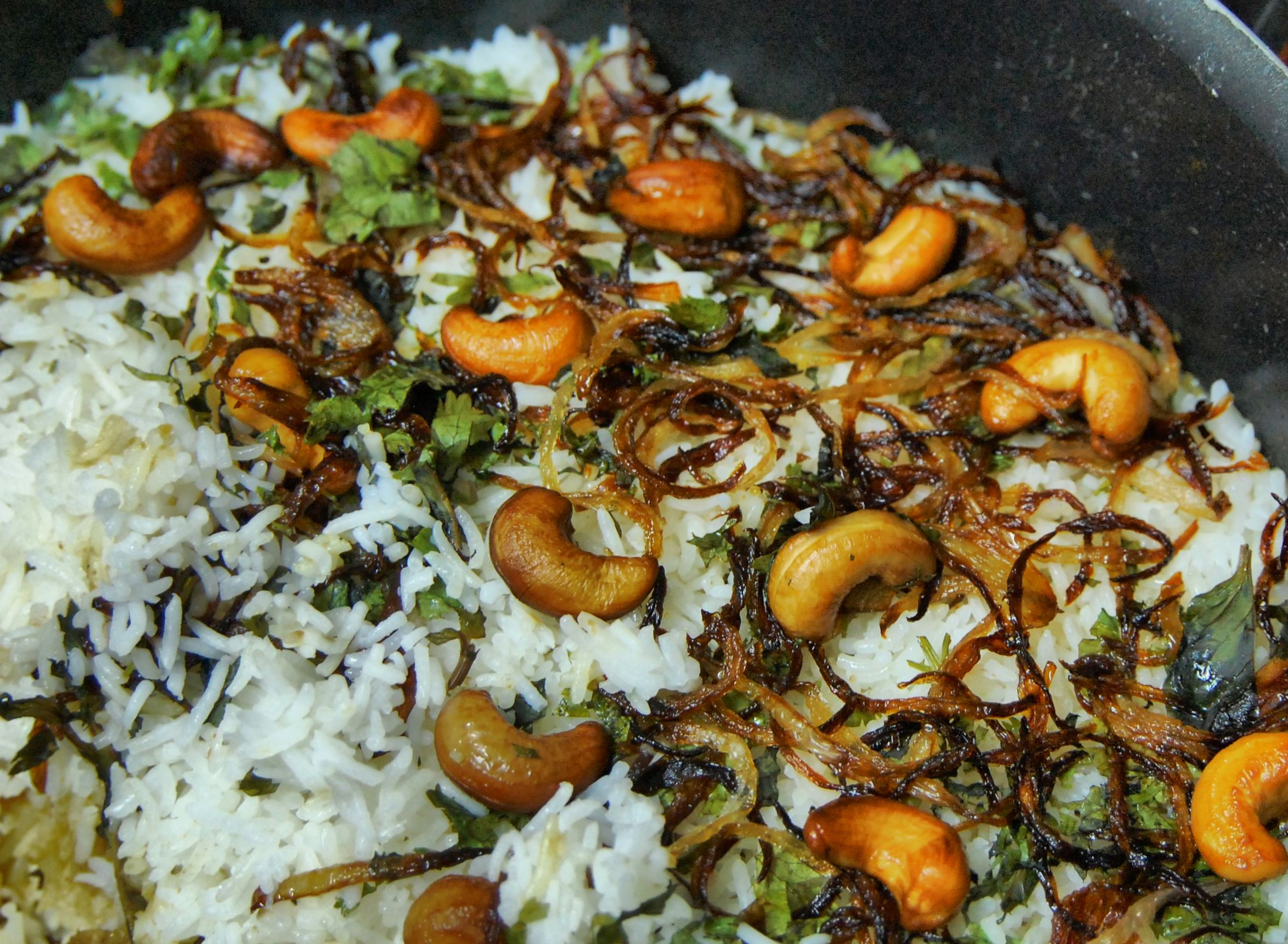
Thalassery biryani

Thalassery biryani is a variation of biryani found in the Indian state of Kerala. It is one of the many dishes of the Kerala Muslim community.

The primary ingredients are chicken with spices and khyma rice mixed with ghee. The spices include mace, cashew nuts, sultana raisins, fennel and cumin seeds, tomatoes, onions, ginger, garlic, shallots, cloves and cinnamon, with little chili.

In Kerala, another variety called beef biryani is well known.

=== Travancore biriyani ===
Travancore biriyani is a dish from Thiruvananthapuram. Characterized by its use of long-grained basmati rice, the biryani is lightly spiced with whole spices such as cloves, cinnamon, and bay leaves, and enriched with ghee or coconut oil. Typically prepared with mutton, chicken, or beef, it is garnished with fried cashew nuts, raisins, fresh coriander, and mint leaves, and often includes a boiled egg at the center. It is served with accompaniments like raita, coconut chutney, lime pickle, and pappadam.

== Outside the Indian subcontinent ==
=== Burma ===
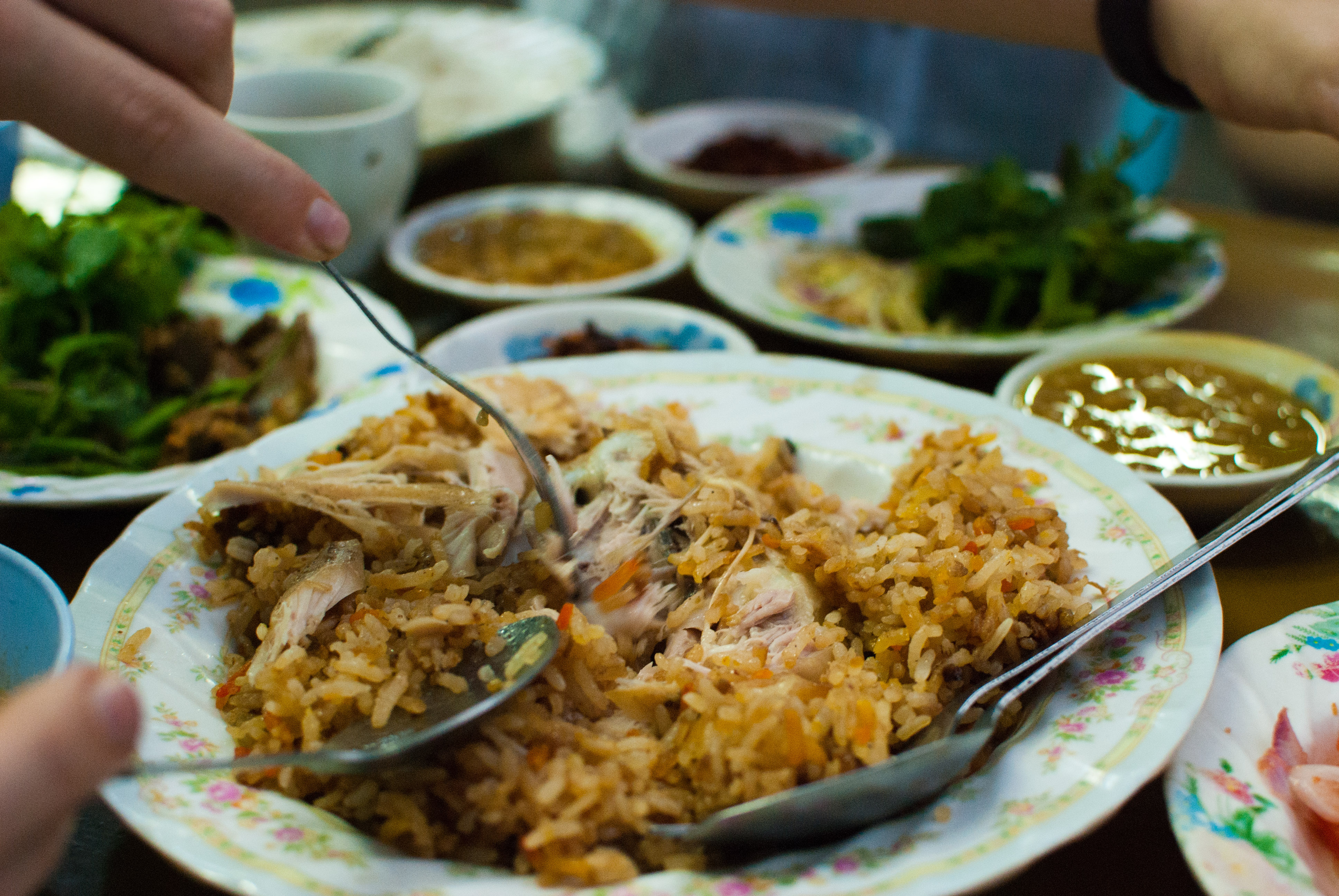
A dish of Burmese biryani (locally known as danpauk)

In Myanmar (Burma), biryani is known in Burmese as danpauk or danbauk (ဒံပေါက်), derived from the Persian term dum pukht, which refers to a slow oven cooking technique. Danbauk is a mainstay at festive events such as Thingyan, weddings and donation feasts. Given danbauk's South Asian origins, danbauk restaurants and chains have traditionally been owned by Muslims, but Buddhist entrepreneurs have entered the market.

Featured ingredients include: cashew nuts, yogurt, raisins and peas, chicken, cloves, cinnamon, saffron and bay leaf cooked in long-grain rice. In danbauk, chicken specially seasoned with a danbauk masala spice mix, is cooked with the rice. Danbauk is typically eaten with a number of side dishes, including a fresh salad of sliced onions, julienned cabbage, sliced cucumbers, fermented limes and lemons, fried dried chilies, and soup. In recent decades, danbauk restaurants have innovated variations, including "ambrosia" biryani (နတ်သုဓာထမင်း), which features dried fruits and buttered rice.

=== West Asia ===
In Iraq and in the states of the Persian Gulf, biryani (برياني: "biryani") is usually saffron-based with chicken usually being the meat or poultry of choice. It is popular throughout Iraq, especially in the Kurdistan Region. Most variations also include vermicelli, fried onions, fried potato cubes, almonds, and raisins spread liberally over the rice.

In Iran, during the Safavid dynasty (1501–1736), a dish called Beriyan Polo (Nastaliq script: بریان پلو) was made with lamb or chicken, marinated overnight—with yogurt, herbs, spices, dried fruits like raisins, prunes or pomegranate seeds—and later cooked in a tannour oven, then served with steamed rice.

=== Afghan biryani ===
A different dish called biryan is popular in Afghanistan. Biryan traces its origins to the same source as biryani, when most of Afghanistan was part of Kabul and Qandahar Subahs and as today sold in Afghanistan as well as in Bhopal, India. Biryan is prepared by cooking gosht and rice together, but without the additional gravy (yakhni) and other condiments that are used in biryani. The Delhi-based historian Sohail Hashmi refers to the biryan as midway between pulao and biryani. Afghan biryani tends to use much dry fruit such as raisins and lesser amounts of meat, often cut into tiny pieces.

=== Indonesia ===
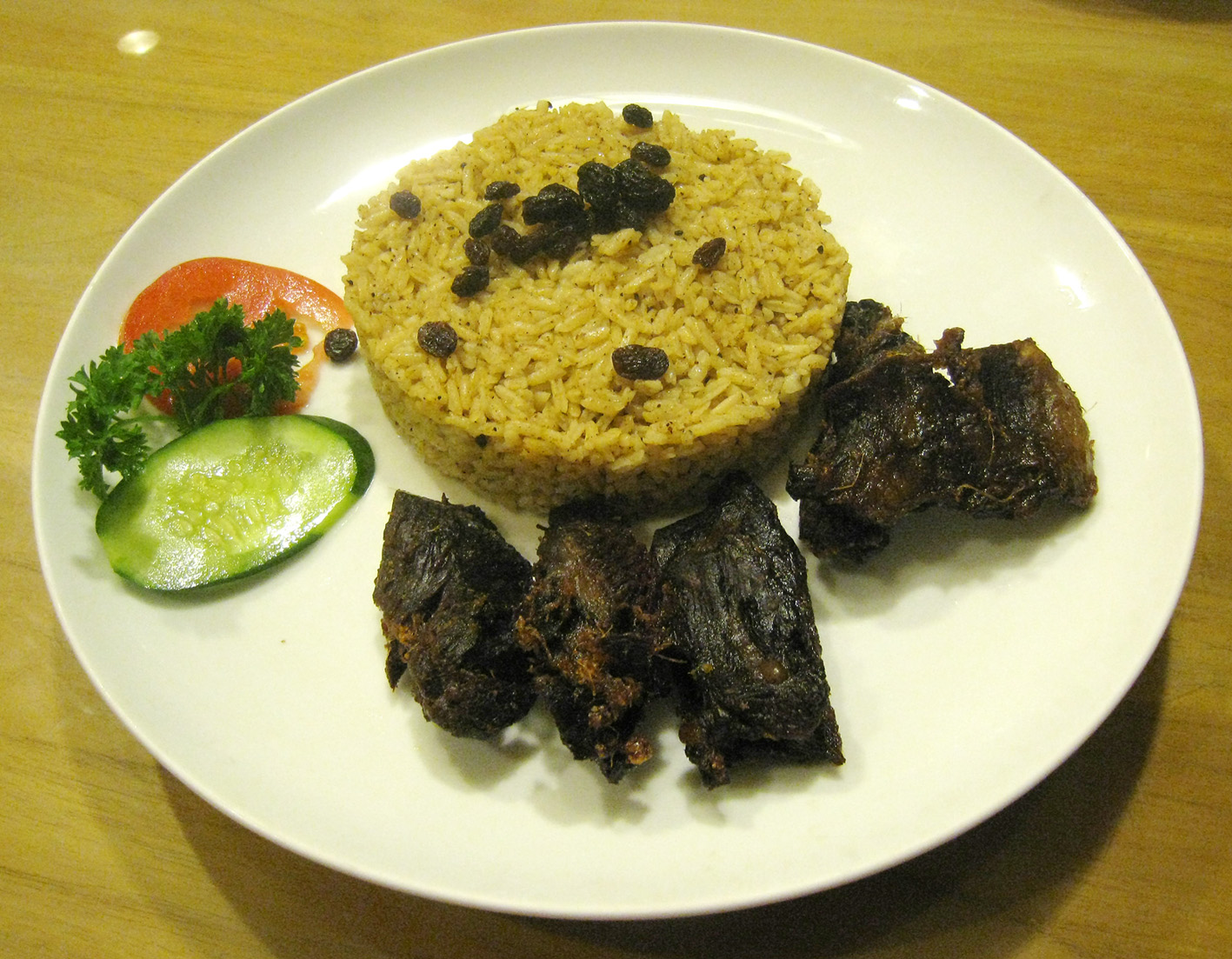
An authentic nasi kebuli served in Jakarta

Nasi kebuli is an Indonesian spicy steamed rice dish cooked in goat meat broth, milk and ghee. Nasi kebuli is descended from kabuli palaw which is an Afghan rice dish, similar to biryani served in the Indian subcontinent.

Although Indonesia has authentic nasi kebuli, Indonesia also inherited and has local-style of biryani which is known as nasi biryani or nasi briyani. Nasi biryani is popular among and often associated as Acehnese, Arab Indonesian, Indian Indonesian and Malay cuisine.

=== Malaysia and Singapore ===
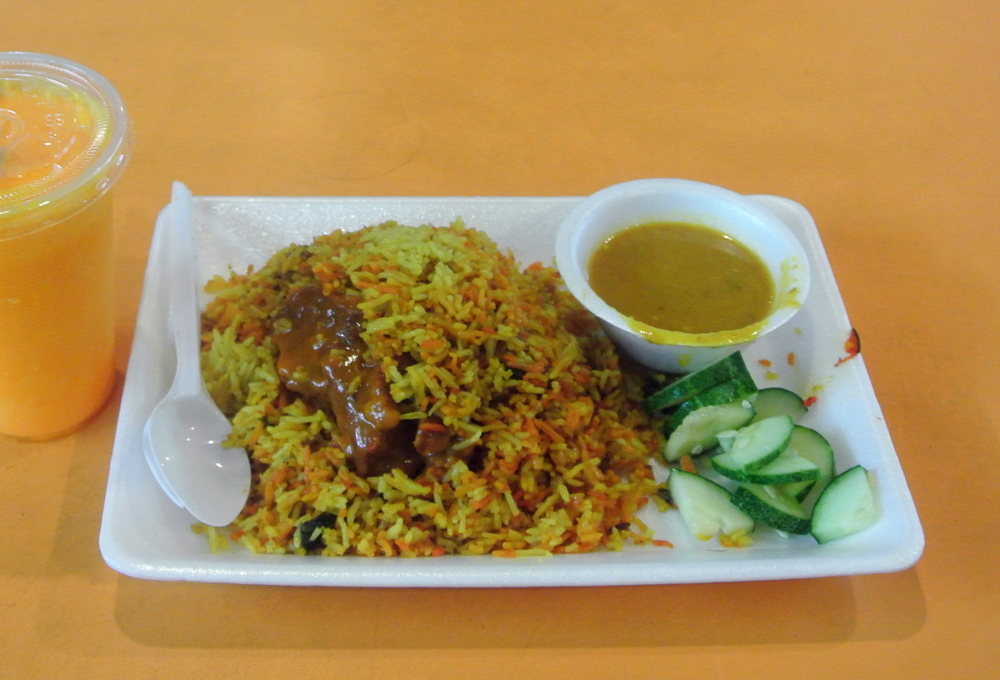
Mutton biryani at Little India, Singapore

The Malaysian and Singaporean variety of biryani is called nasi briyani or nasi biryani. Although authentic styles of biryani from South India are popular, nasi briyani remains the most popular. The key differences between nasi briyani and Indian biryanis are that the meat in nasi briyani is cooked separately from the rice, and there is more curry, sauce, or gravy present in the nasi briyani than in Indian biryanis.

There are eateries that sell pork as the main meat of the dish in Singapore.

=== Philippines ===
Kapampangan cuisine of the Philippines (often in Pampanga) features a special dish called nasing biringyi (chicken saffron rice), resembling the Malaysian nasi briyani in both name and form, that is typically prepared only during special occasions such as weddings, family get-togethers or fiestas. It is not a staple of the Filipino diet as it is difficult to prepare compared to other usual dishes. A version that has merged with the Filipino version of the Spanish paella is known as bringhe.

South Asian and Middle Eastern-styled biryani underwent a surge in popularity in Manila in the 2020s, with both high-end restaurants and working-class eateries serving the dish, popularized by both Indian Filipinos and other South Asians as well as returning Overseas Filipino Workers from the Middle East. Some restaurants adjust recipes to suit Filipino palates.

=== Thailand ===
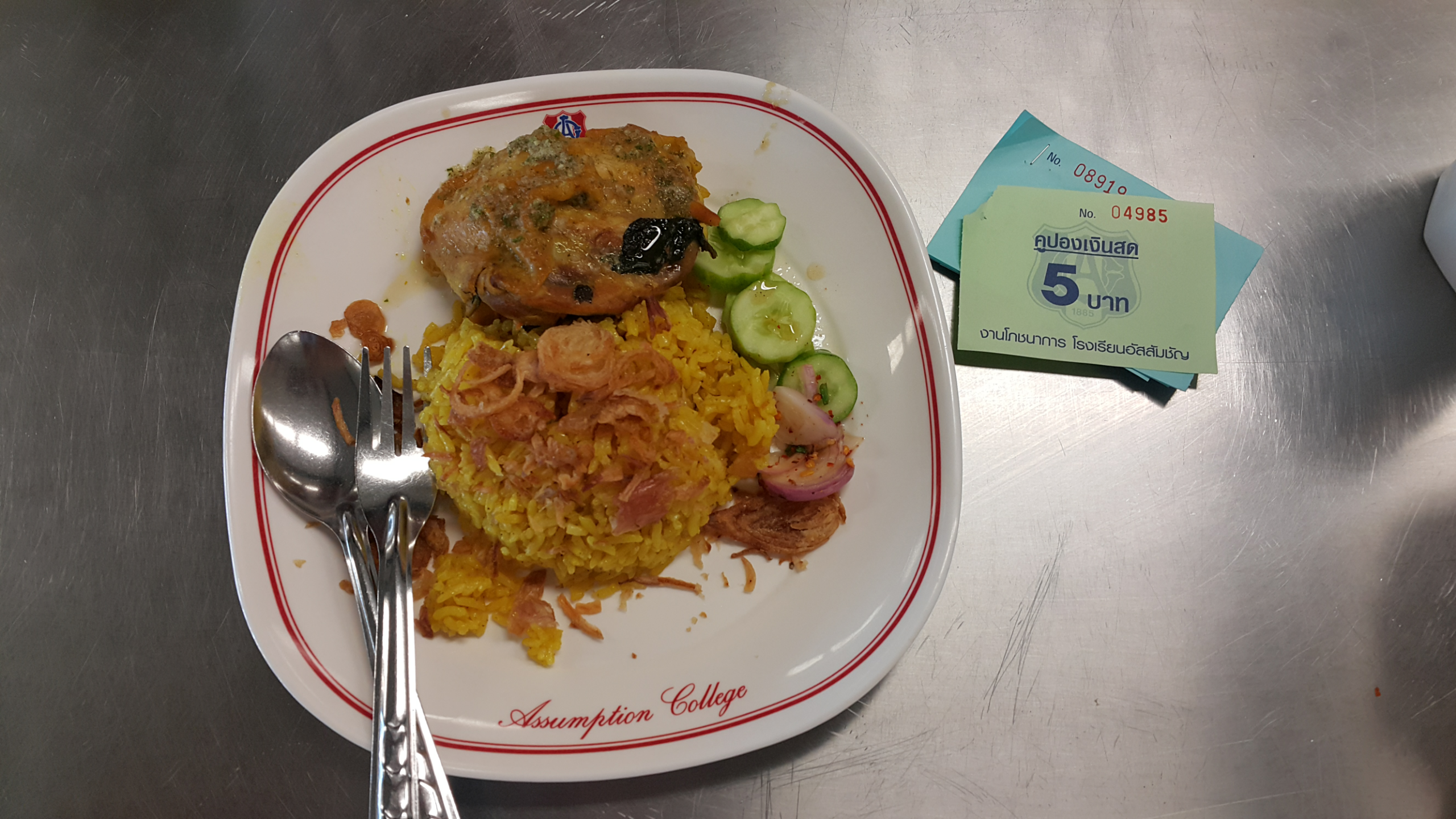
Khao mhok ghai (Thai biryani with chicken)

Biryani in Thailand is commonly known as khao mhok (Thai: ข้าวหมก). It is commonly paired with chicken, beef or fish and topped with fried garlic. The dish is common in Thai cuisine and is often served with a green sour sauce.

=== Zanzibar and Kenya ===
Zanzibar and Kenya has its own form of biryani characterized by the mixture of East African and Indian spices, as well as influences from Arab cuisine. The meat used is most commonly chicken.
