= Samba (rice) =

Variety of rice found in Sri Lanka

Samba is a variety of rice grown in Tamil Nadu, some other parts of India and Sri Lanka, and has a small ovular grain, compared to the long grain of basmati rice.

== Description ==
Samba rice has a distinct taste and can be described as having a more 'starchy' or 'corny' flavor.And also liked by many as it tastes better than other rice and also it becomes less harder after cooking..

The grain itself is much harder than the other varieties and when cooked is less 'fluffy' in texture so gives a more filling meal with a higher caloric value.

All Samba rice grain is harvested locally by the mallas of India and there are many sub-varieties ranging in grain size and price. Seeraga Samba is the most expensive sub-variety and has the finest grain. It is approximately a third the size of a grain of basmati rice.

== Cultivation ==
Samba rice is grown extensively in the South Indian state of Tamil Nadu. Rice grown in Samba season (August through January) is referred to as Samba rice. This rice is grown for a longer duration compared to other types of rice.

A subvariety of the Samba, known as the Seeraga Samba or Jeera Samba (in Tamil: சீரக சம்பா, which means 'Cumin samba', due to its resemblance to cumin seeds), is popular for consumption in south-east India. It is exclusively cultivated along the Cauvery river and peculiarly in its delta, notably in the Vellapallam and Keevalur talukas of Nagapattinam district, Uppiliyapuram of Tiruchirappalli district and in various areas of Thanjavur district. This subvariety was presented in 2018 by an association of farmers to benefit of a geographical indication (GI tag), the request is currently being processed.

== See also ==
- Traditional rice varieties of Tamil Nadu
- List of rice varieties
