= Vellapallam =

Vellapallam Vallapalam Vellappallam
- Village
- Location in Tamil Nadu, India Vellapallam (India)
- Coordinates: 10.51°N 79.83°E
- Country: India
- State: Tamil Nadu

Government
  - Type: Village
  - Body: Vedaranyam (District)

Area
  - Total: 20 km^{2} (7.7 sq mi)

Population (2011)
  - Total: 2,000
  - Density: 100/km^{2} (260/sq mi)

Languages
  - Official: Tamil
- Time zone: UTC+5:30 (IST)
- PIN: 611112
- Website: www.nagapattinam.tn.nic.in/

Vellapallam is a village located between Velankanni and Vedaranyam in Nagapattinam district in the Indian state of Tamil Nadu. Duraisamy. N has been elected as Village President from period of 2019 to July 2025. The major part of this village has been sanctioned for built-in harbour are in under construction.

== Demographics ==
As of 2001 India census, Vellapallam had a population of 3,728. Males constitute 48% of the population and females 52%. The literacy rate is 61%, higher than the national average of 59.5%. Male literacy is 64%, and female literacy is 59%. In Vellappallam, 11% of the population is under 6 years of age. Peoples living from different religion of Hindu, and Christian and different innercast in each religion. East side of the village is surrounded by East Bay of Bengal and other sides are lands. This village is in Thalaignayar panchayat. This village was affected by the tsunami. More than 20 people were killed.

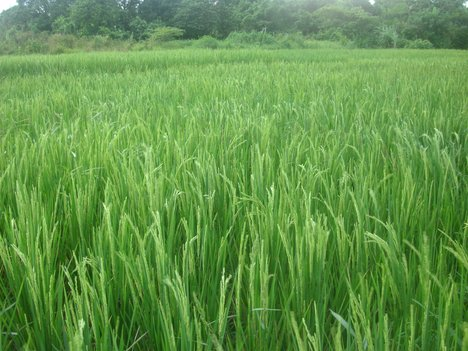
God's kitchen

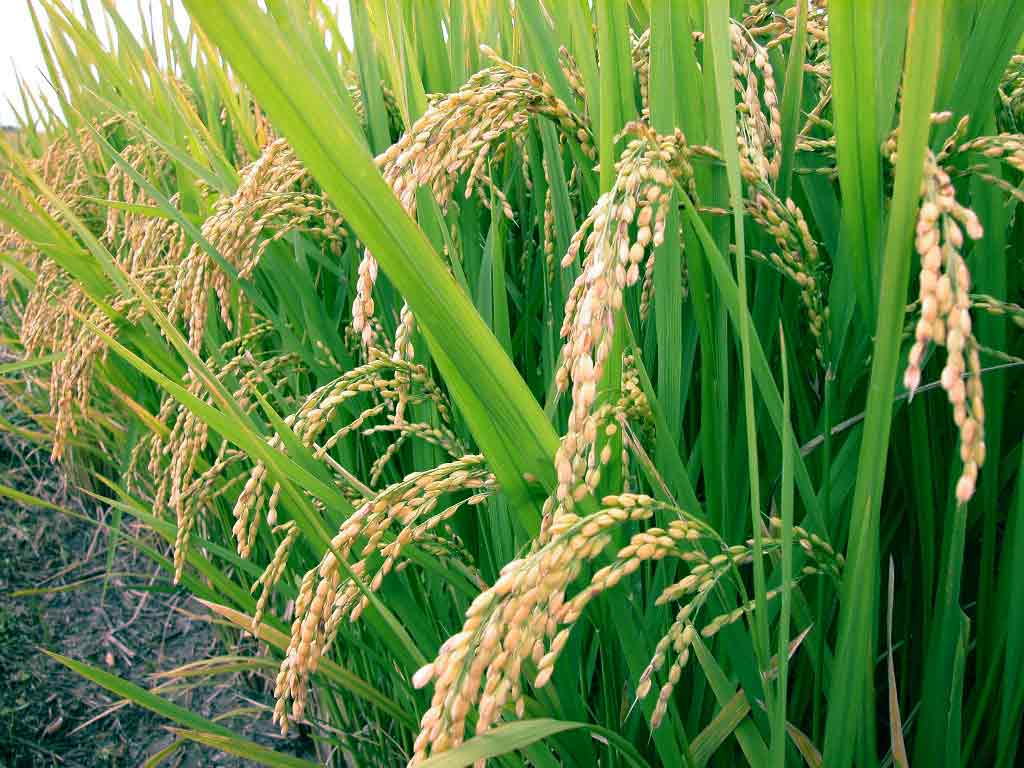
Rice Farming

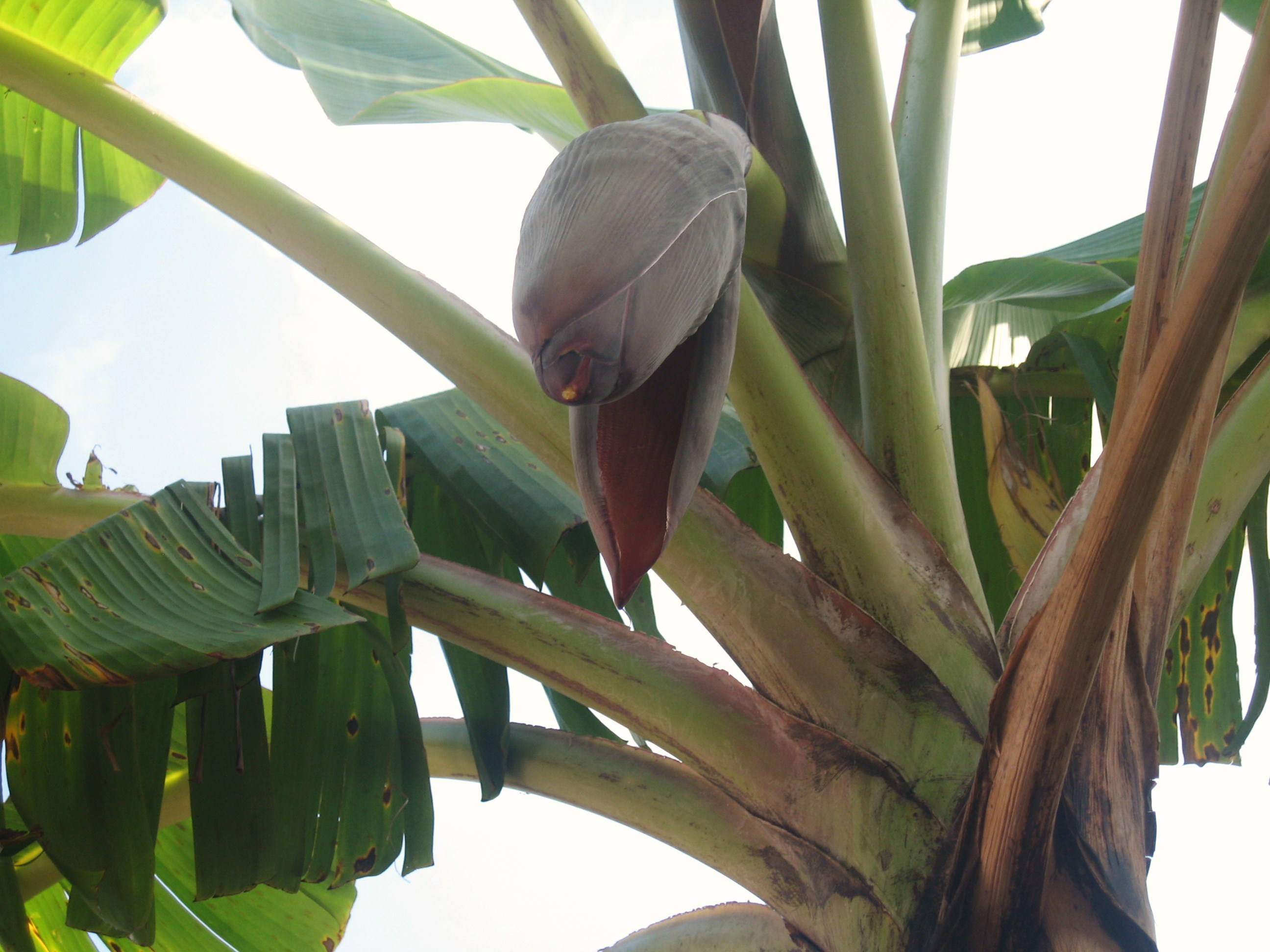
Banana tree

== Education ==
Two Elementary and one Higher Secondary school owned by the village. In elementary school more than 300 students studying. Only one Higher Secondary school running for more than four nearest villages and nearly 1500 students are studying. The main occupation of this village is agriculture and fishing. The primary occupation is agriculture (80%), fishing (10%). Other 10% of the peoples working as educated professionals like Teachers, Engineers, Banking etc.

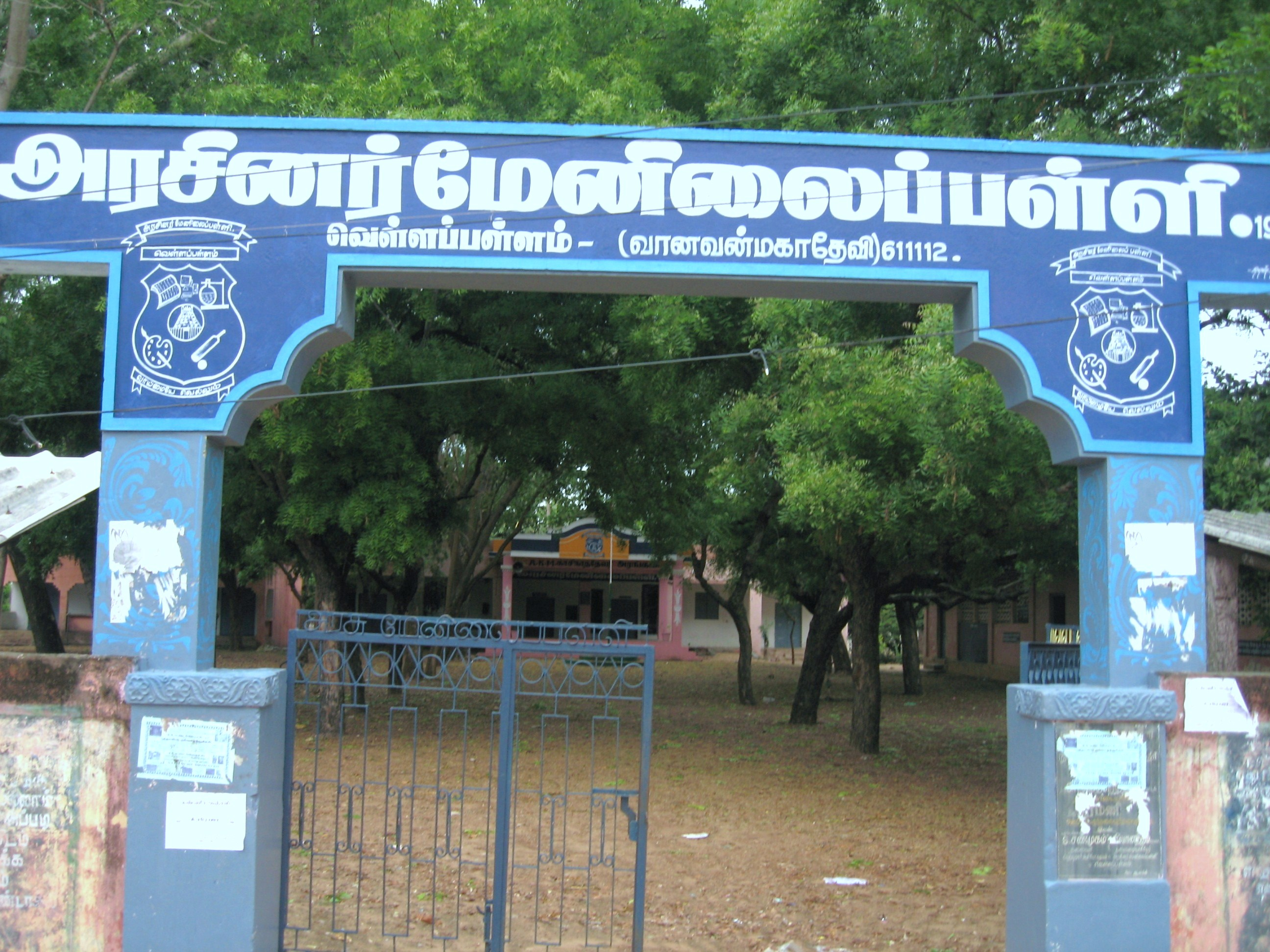
School Entrance

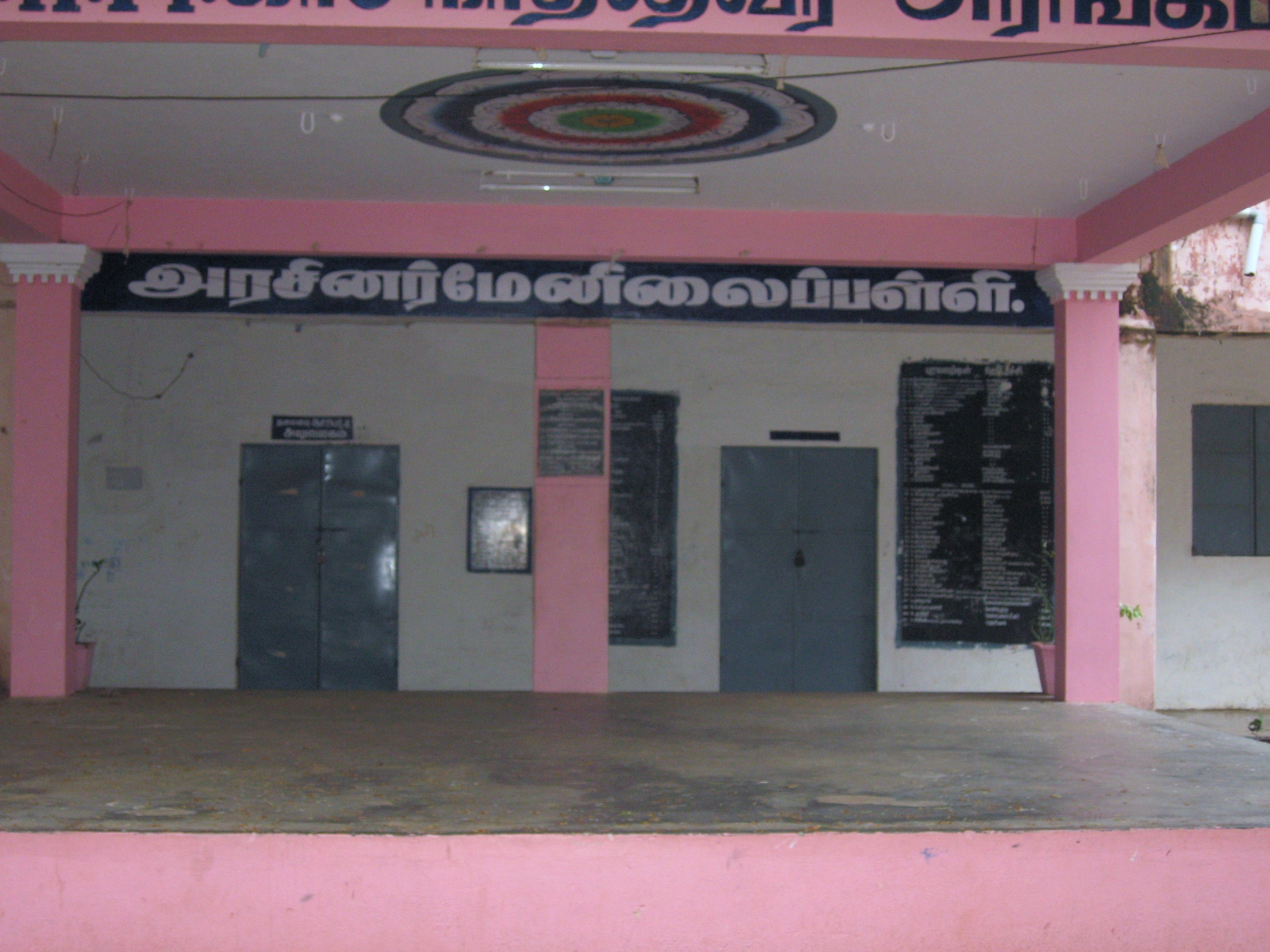
Auditorium

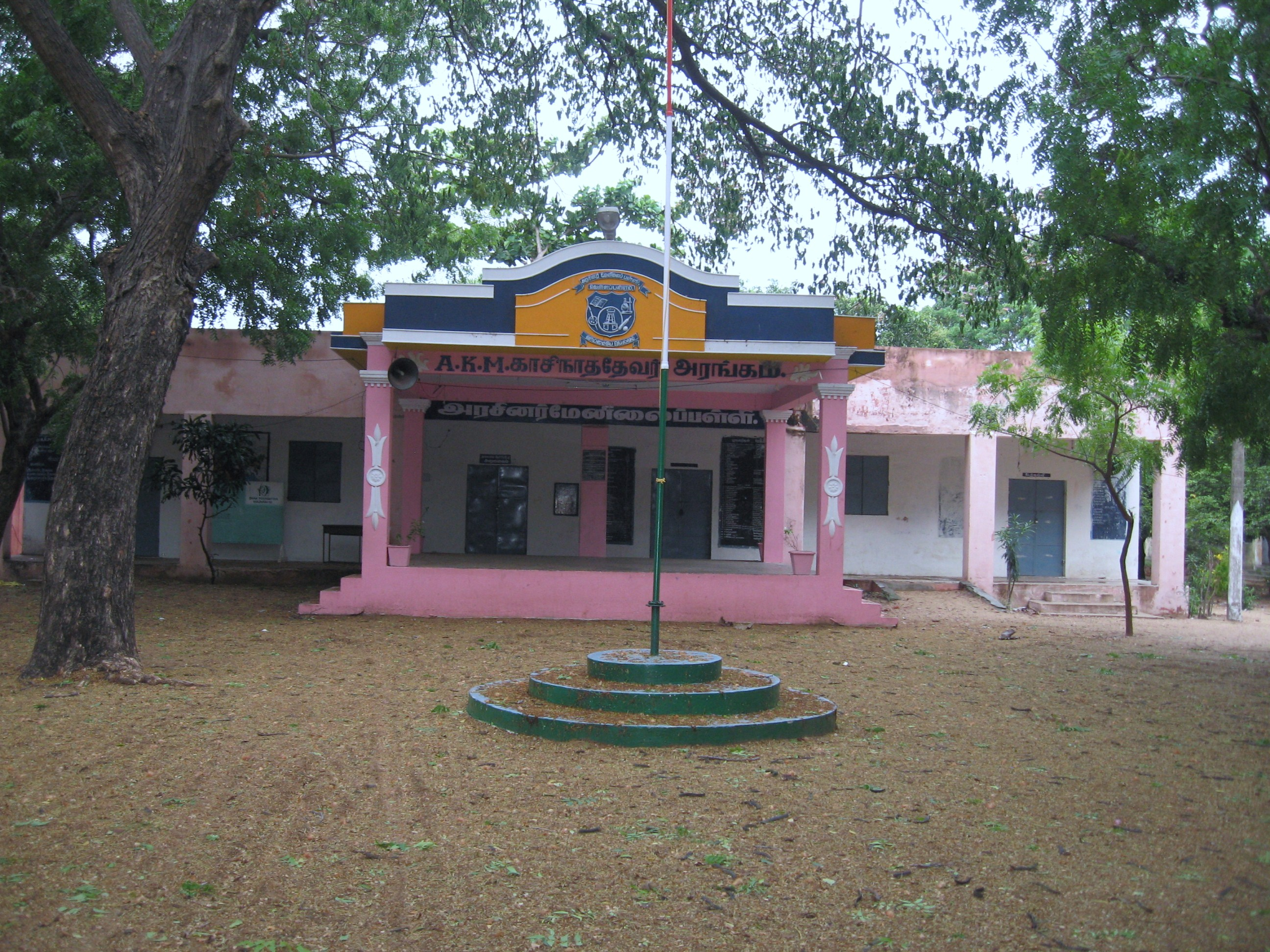
View from entrance

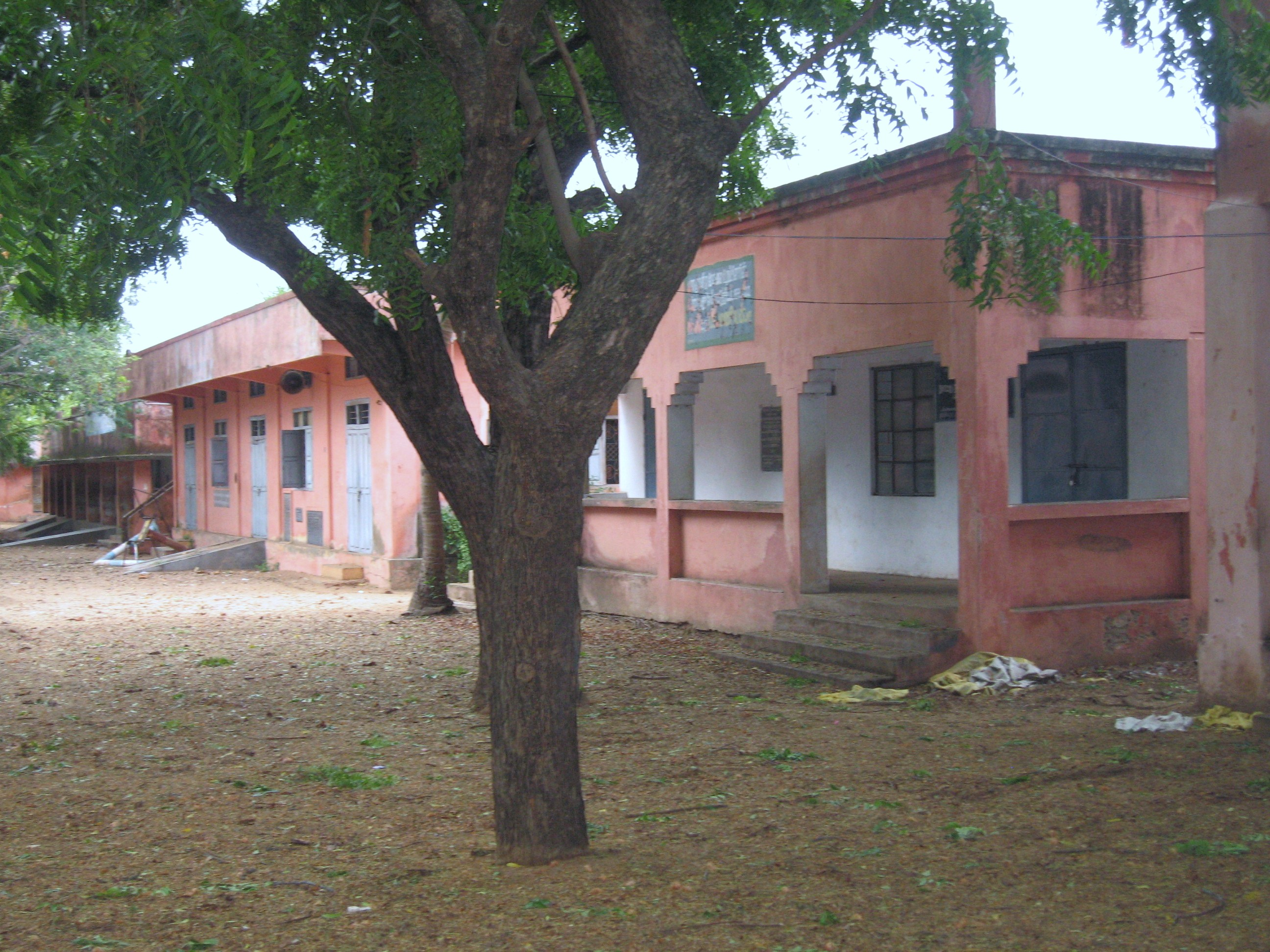
Class rooms

== Places of interest ==
- Athangarai Muthu Marriyamman Temple
- Kanchiyappar Temple
- Marriyamman, Pidariamman Temple
- Harbour (under construction)
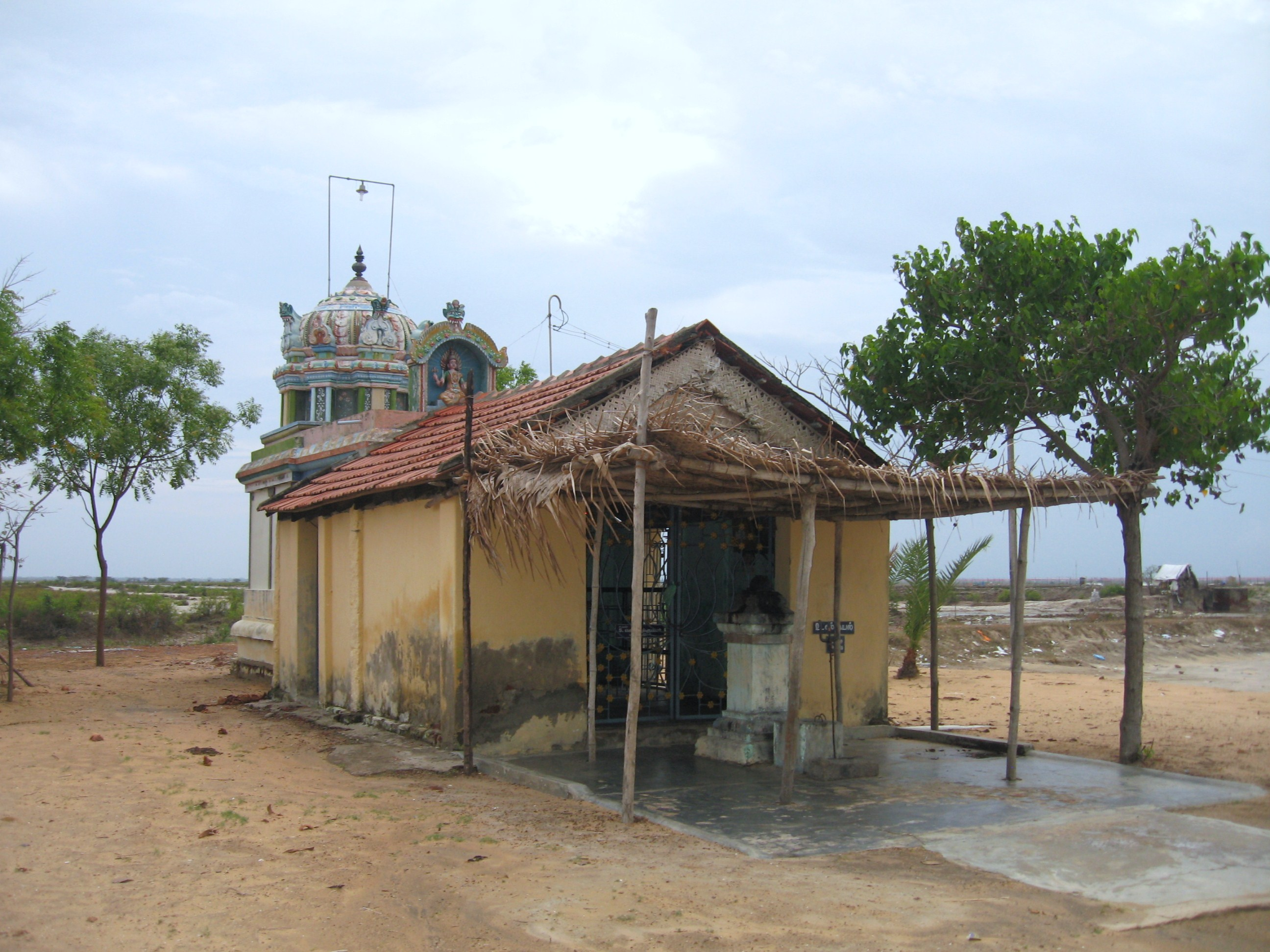
Athangarai Muthu Marriyamman Temple

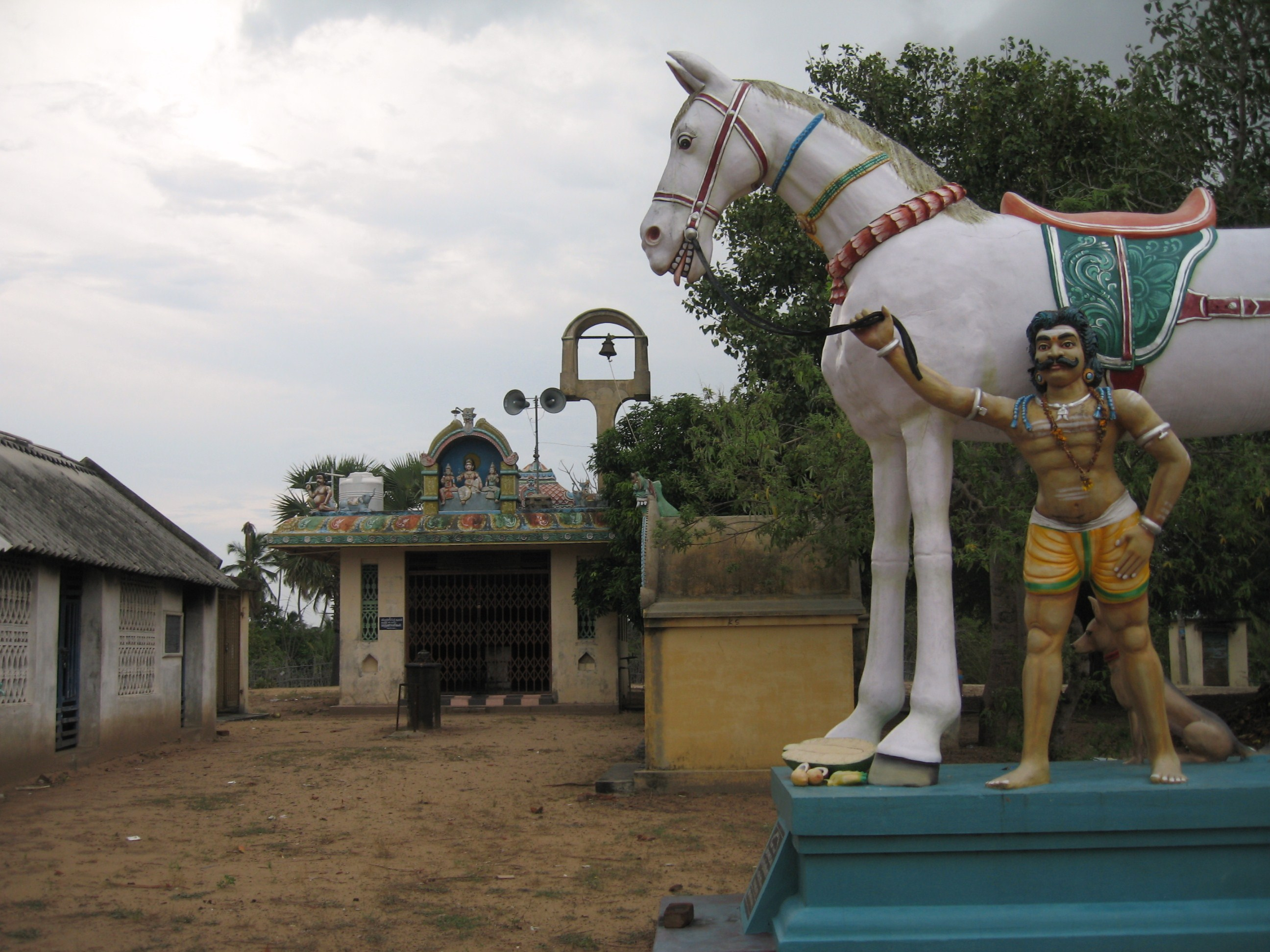
Kanchiyappar Temple

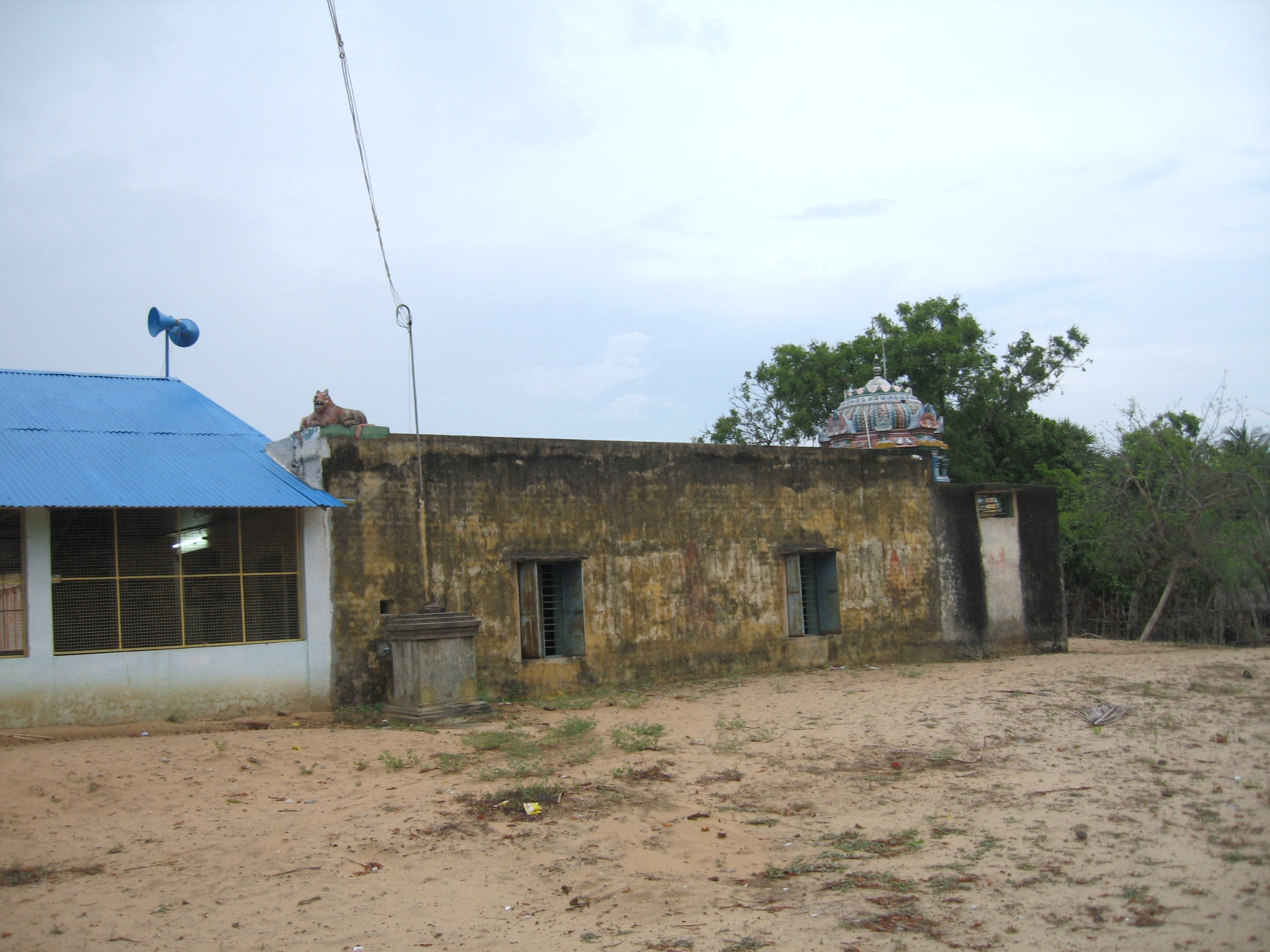
Marriyamman, Pidariamman Temple

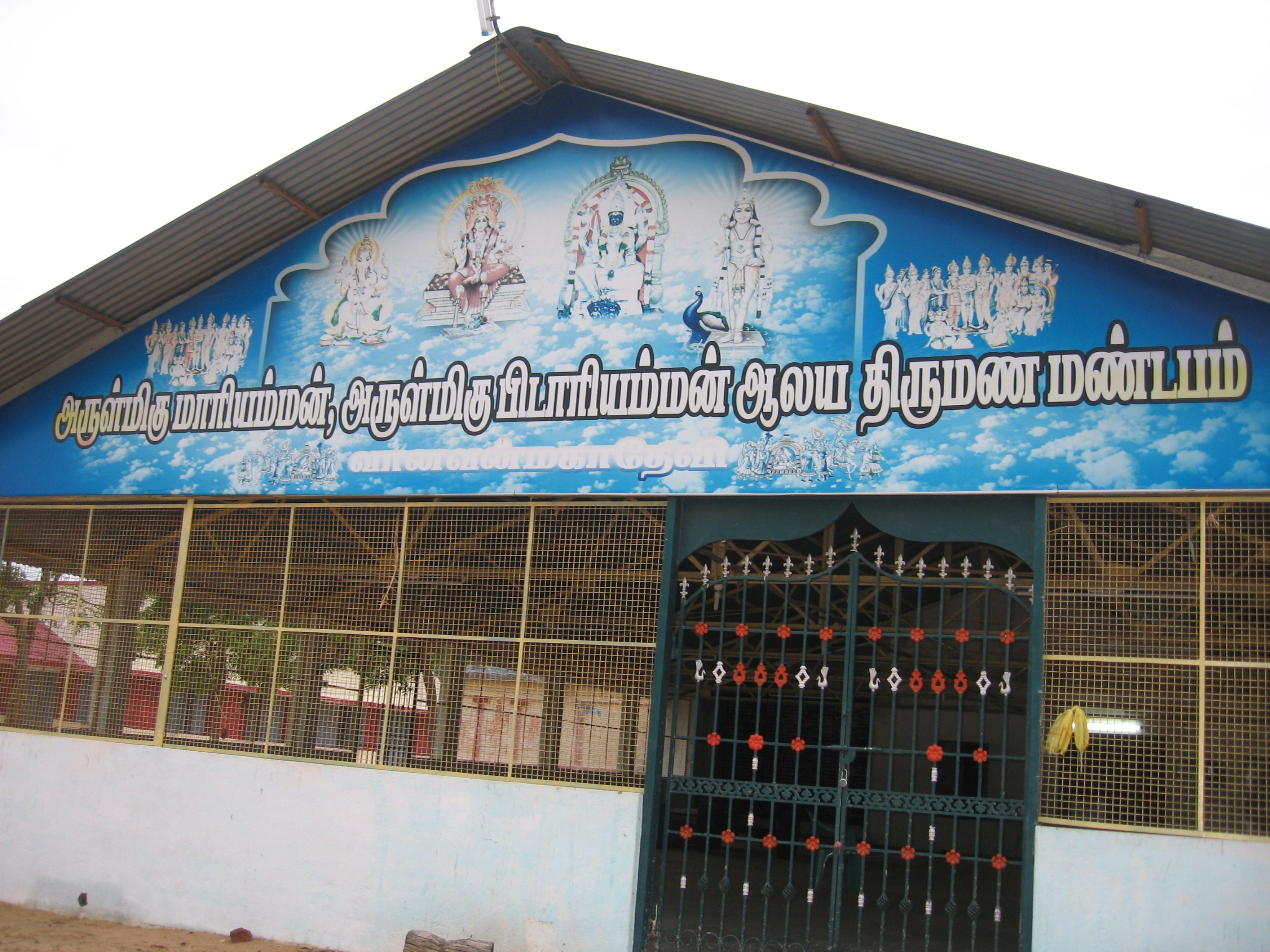
Mazhai Muthu Marriyamman Marriage Hall
