= Vietnam National Authority of Tourism =

Vietnamese government agency

- Cục Du lịch Quốc gia Việt Nam

Agency overview
- Formed: 27 June 1978 (48 years ago)
- Jurisdiction: Government of Vietnam
- Headquarters: 80 Quan Su, Hoan Kiem, Hanoi
- Motto: Vietnam – Timeless Charm
- Agency executive: Nguyen Trung Khanh, Chairman
- Parent department: Ministry of Culture, Sports and Tourism (Vietnam)
- Website: vietnamtourism.gov.vn/en

The Vietnam National Authority of Tourism (formerly Vietnam National Administration of Tourism) is the government agency of Vietnam which manages tourist operations and activities throughout the country. It has full control in terms of business development, planning, public relations, personnel training, conducting research, and instructing and inspecting the implementation of policies and other regulations in the tourism sector.

== See also ==
- Tourism in Vietnam
