= Military hotels in Bengaluru =

Military hotels are a large number of restaurants and eateries located in different parts of Bangalore. Some of the notable hotels are Shivaji Military Hotel, Ranganna Military Hotel, Naidu Military Hotel, S.K Donne Biryani Military Hotel etc.

== History ==
The origins of the term are not clearly known, but it is assumed that they were originally run by or for families associated with the army. Shivaji Military Hotel is one of the oldest military hotels in the city, having been established in 1924.

== Cuisine ==
Military hotels in Bangalore serve mainly non-vegetarian foods, but they generally don't serve beef and pork. Some of the commonly served food items are biryani, mutton chaap, keema, chicken, and ragi mudde.

1. Shivaji Military Hotel,
2. Ranganna Military Hotel,
3. Naidu Military Hotel,
4. Kalpatharu Hindu Military Hotel,
5. S.K Donne Biryani Military Hotel,
6. Chandu's Military Hotel,
7. Gowdru's Military Hotel,
8. Rajanna Hindu Military Hotel,
9. Shivanna Hindu Military Hotel,
10. Royanna Military Canteen
