= South Indian cuisine =

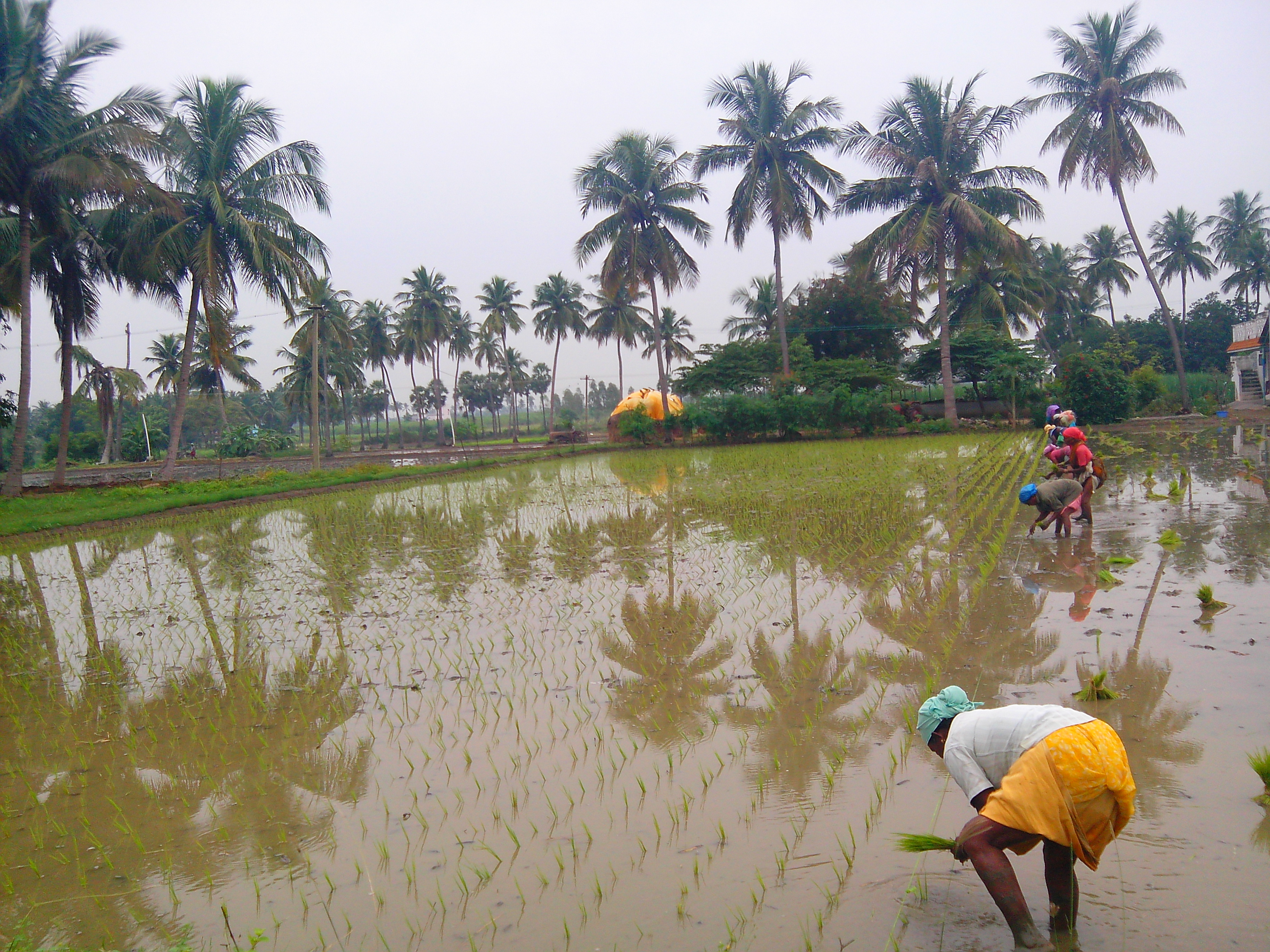
Rice and coconut (seen here growing in Tamil Nadu) are key ingredients of South Indian cuisine.

The cuisine of South India encompasses those of five states, Andhra Pradesh, Karnataka, Kerala, Telangana, and Tamil Nadu, and the union territory of Lakshadweep.

South Indian cuisine includes the cuisines of the five southern states of India— Andhra Pradesh, Karnataka, Kerala, Telangana, Tamil Nadu, and the union territory of Lakshadweep. Sub-cuisines within these include Udupi, Chettinad, Hyderabadi, Thalassery, Saraswat, and Mangalorean Catholic. South Indian cuisine shares similarities with the cuisines of Sri Lanka and the Maldives due to similar geographic location and culture.

== History ==
=== Early culinary texts ===
According to culinary historians K. T. Achaya and Ammini Ramachandran, the ancient Sangam literature dated from 3rd century BCE to 3rd century CE offers early references to food and recipes in the Sangam era, whether a feast at king's palace, meals in towns and countryside, at hamlets in forests, pilgrimage and the rest-houses during travels. It describes cuisine of various landscapes and people who reside there, how they prepared food and what they served their guests. Poet Avvaiyar for example describes her hearty summer lunch as "steamed rice, smoked and mashed aubergine and tangy frothy buttermilk", while poet Mudathama Kanniyar describes "Skewered goat meat, crispy fried vegetables, rice and over 16 varieties of dishes" as part of the royal lunch he was treated to in the palace of the Chola king. Sangam literature offers references to food eaten on several different types of leaf platters and thalis with multiple bowls. Sangam period archeological sites like Tirunelveli has uncovered notable household bronzeware utensils including "ornamental vase stands, bowls, jars and cups of different patterns with ornamental bowl lids" which were likely used for thali presentation as described in Sangam texts.

Several notable Indian cookbooks were written in southern India in the medieval period. These include Lokopakara (1025 CE), Manasollasa (1130 CE), Soopa Shastra (1508 CE), Bhojana Kutuhala (1675 CE), and Sivatattva Ratnakara (1699 CE). These cookbooks contains both vegetarian and non-vegetarian cuisines, with exception of Soopa Shastra which is a Jain vegetarian cookbook.

=== Maritime trade ===
Indian Ocean trade played an important role in the spread of Indian spices to the western world during the classical era. Black pepper is native to the Malabar Coast of India, while the Malabar pepper is extensively cultivated there. During the classical era, spices including black pepper, cinnamon, and cardamom, and fragrant woods like sandalwood and agarwood, were part of the Indo-Roman trade network from the ancient port of Muziris in the southwestern coast of India. During the Middle Ages prior to the Age of Discovery, which began at the end of the 15th century CE, the kingdom of Calicut (modern Kozhikode) on Malabar Coast was the centre of Indian pepper exports to the Red Sea and Europe, with Arab traders being particularly active. Tomatoes and chili peppers were introduced from Central America by the Portuguese following the Columbian exchange (from 1492 onwards). "English Vegetables" such as cabbage, cauliflower, and turnip, as they were at one time termed, became part of local cuisine by late 1800s.

== Cuisine ==
South Indian cuisine is distinguished by multiple elements, one being the use of intense aromatic mixtures of spices, often extremely spicy hot, for curry dishes. These make use of roasted spices and aromatic herbs, the dishes made hot with chili and pepper, and sometimes with coconut milk.

Andhra Pradesh cuisine is hotly-spiced and often vegetarian, with seafood prominent along the coast; Kerala too has a range of seafood dishes from its coastline. The cuisine of Tamil Nadu is similarly mainly vegetarian, but even hotter. In Telangana, Hyderabadi cuisine is somewhat milder but subtle and full of flavour, making use of saffron, nuts, and dried fruits as well as warmer spices in dishes for the Nizams, the former rulers. A staple of Karnataka cuisine is jolada rotti, a flat unleavened bread made of sorghum flour. It is eaten with pulse curries, ennegayi (stuffed aubergine) and chutneys. The cuisine of Lakshadweep is based on coconut, fish, and starches; a range of dishes employ coconut milk. Fish, especially tuna, is important in the cuisine; tuna meat is made into Rihaakuru, a thick brown fish sauce.

Rice is a staple element in South Indian cuisine, served boiled or made into uttapam pancakes, dosas, or idli steamed cakes. Other characteristic ingredients include coconut oil for cooking and lentils for dal.

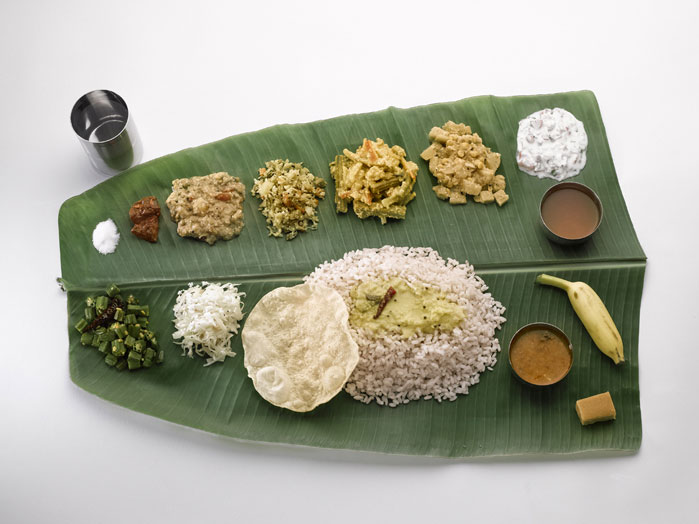
Vegetarian south Indian meal served on banana leaf

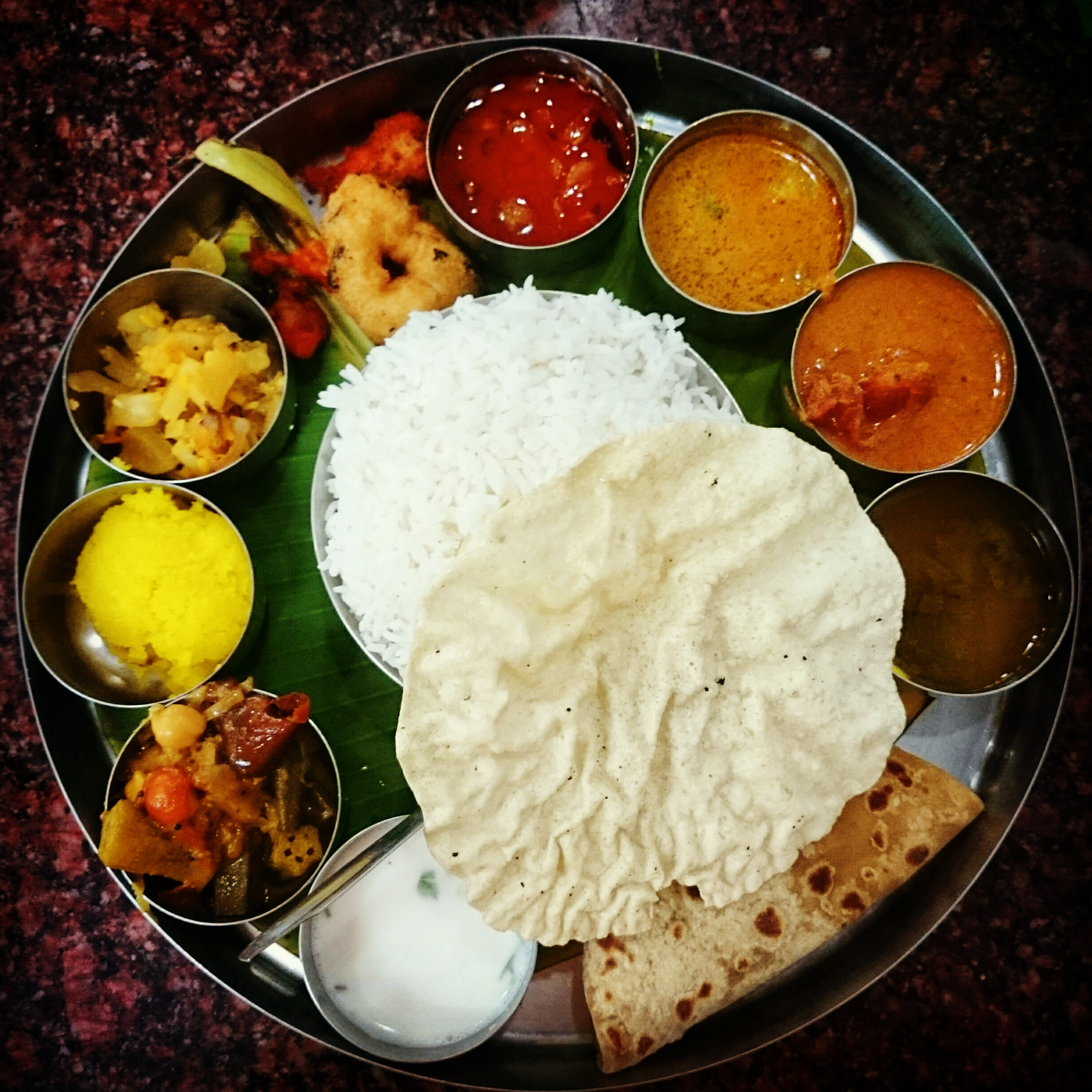
Non-vegetarian south Indian bhojanam thali

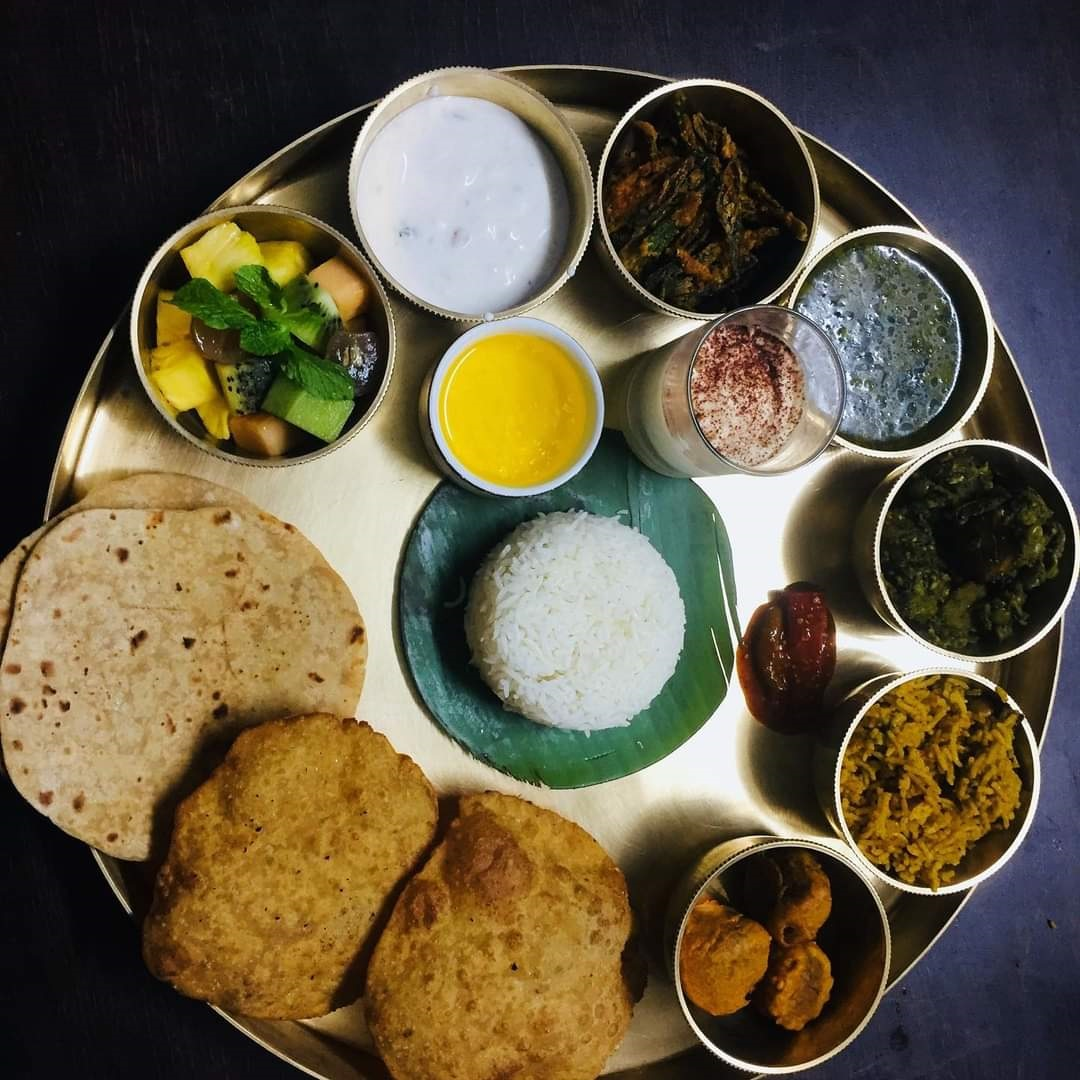
South Indian meal served in traditional bronzeware thali

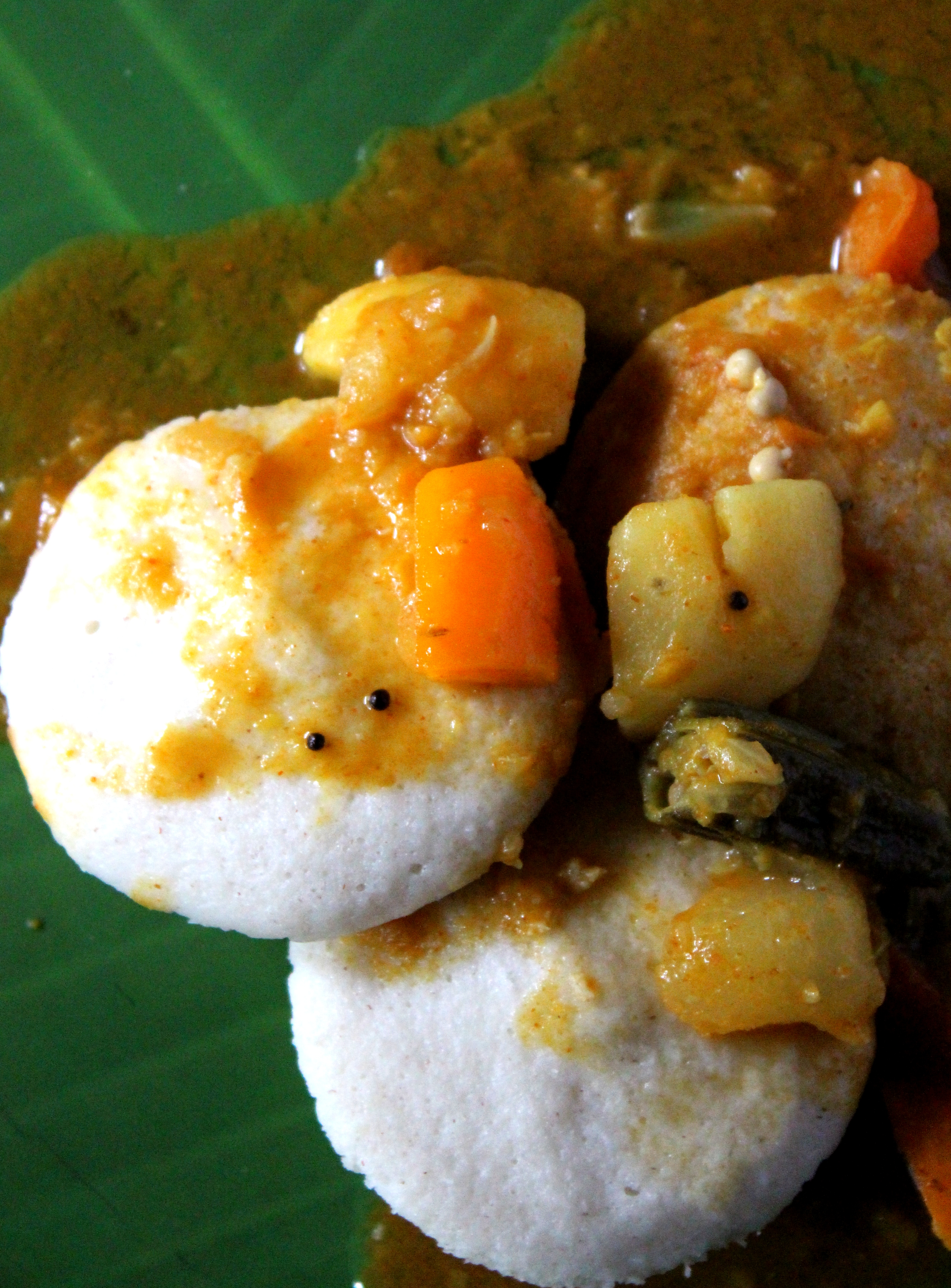
Idli and sambar, a typical south Indian breakfast dish

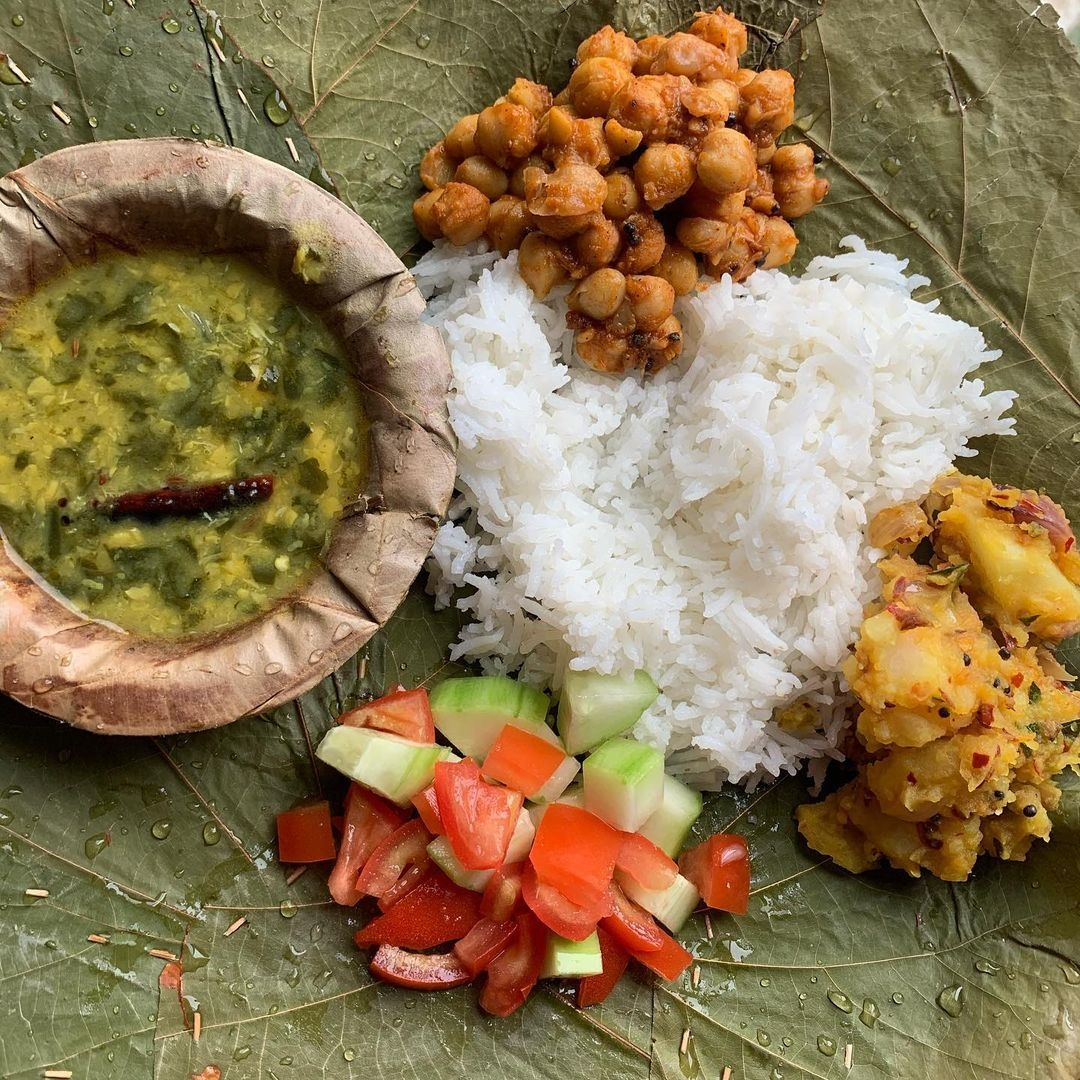
South Indian meal served on dried mantharai ilai

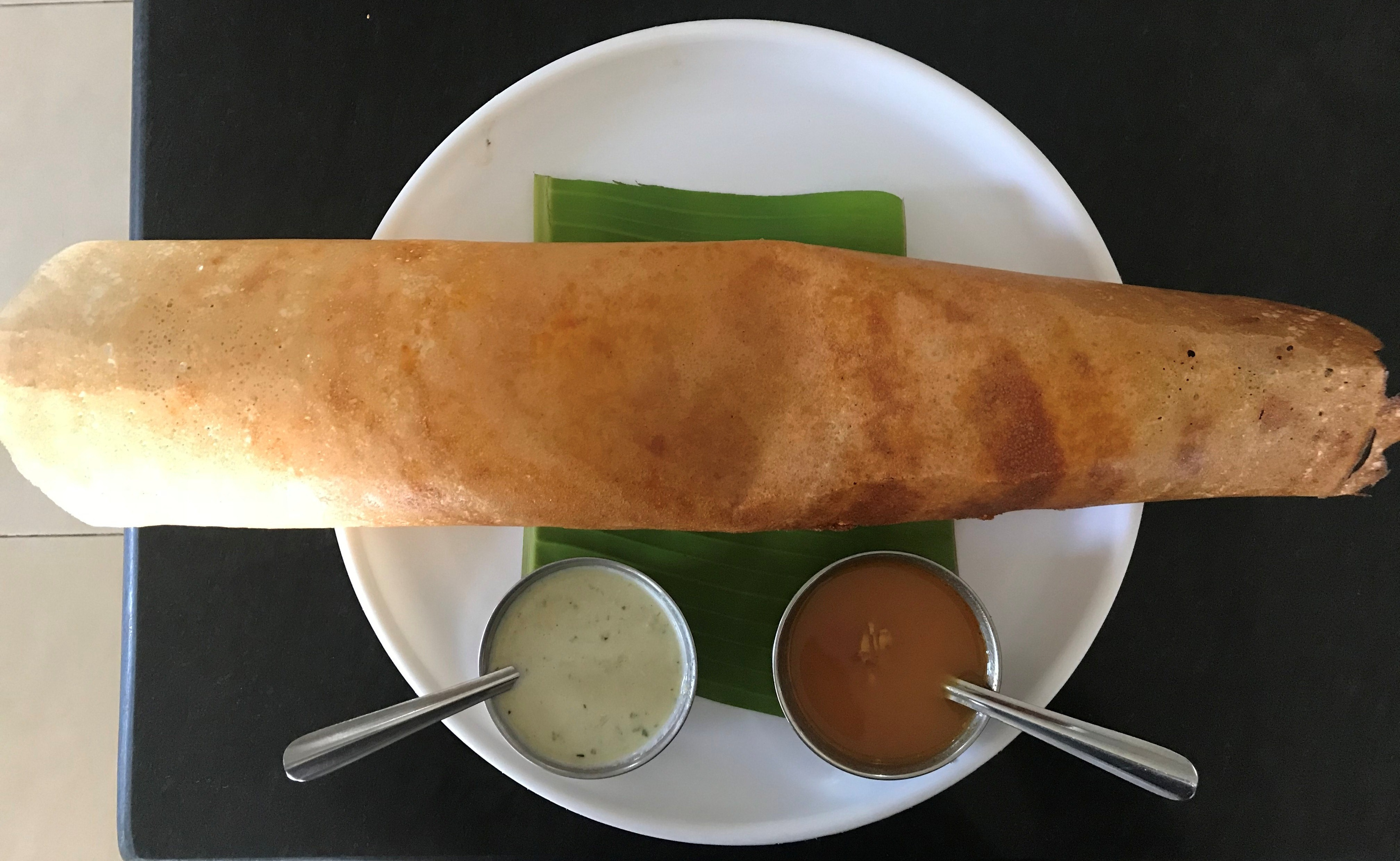
Dosa, a typical south Indian breakfast dish
