= Karnataka cuisine =

Cuisine from the state of Karnataka, India

Karnataka cuisine is the cuisine of the Indian state of Karnataka. It is commonly served on a banana leaf, especially for special occasions.

Its varieties include Mysore and Bangalore cuisine, North Karnataka cuisine, Udupi cuisine, Kodagu and Coorg cuisine, Karavali and coastal cuisine, and Saraswat cuisine. It includes vegan, vegetarian, and meat items, as well as savory and sweet dishes.

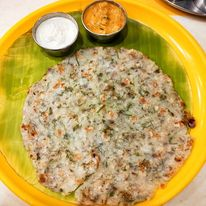
Akki rotti

Dishes that originated in Karnataka but have become popular outside the state include idli, rava idli, and Mysore masala dosa. Other Karnataka cuisine items include:

- Avalakki - Flattened parboiled rice cooked with spices. In Karnataka avalakki can be eaten with majjige or gojju.
- Chitranna - Chitranna is prepared using rice, onion, green chili, lemon or raw mango peel, coriander leaves and turmeric.
- Bisi bele bath- A spicy rice-based dish. It originated in Mysore, Karnataka and from there spread across South India.
- Jolada rotti - The staple diet of most of North Karnataka. It is eaten with pulse curries, ennegayi or assorted chutneys.
- Mysore pak - Sweet dish prepared by using gram flour and ghee
- Holige (obbattu) - Extremely common sweet dish in Karnataka
- Neer dosa - Very common in Mangalore and Malenadu regions.
- Ragi mudde - Very common in rural south Karnataka. Eaten with bassaaru and upasaaru.

== Gallery ==
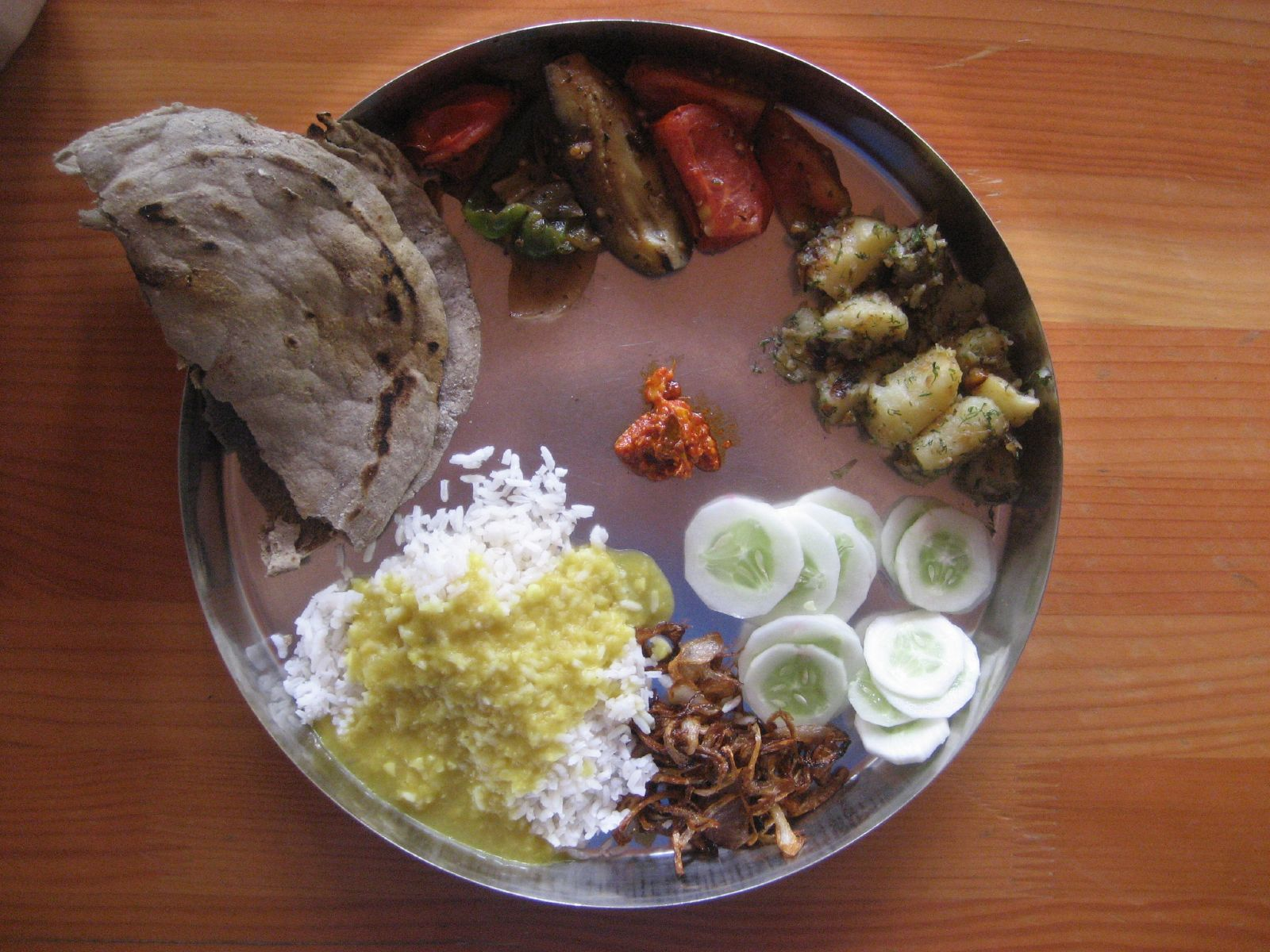
Typical north Karnataka staple meal, rice, bele sambar curry, millet Jolada rotti, sauteed vegetables called palya and pickle.

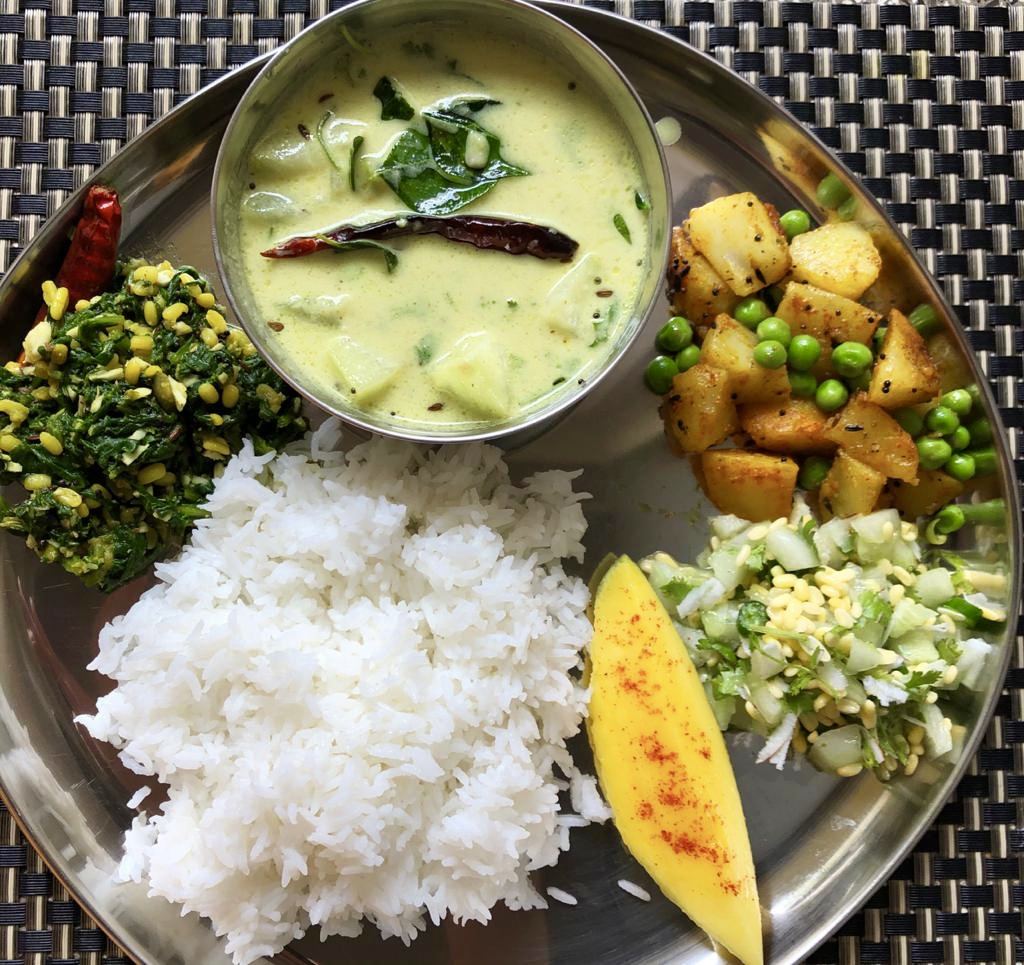
Rice, served with palya sautéed greens and vegetables, kosambari salad, bottle gourd buttermilk curry.

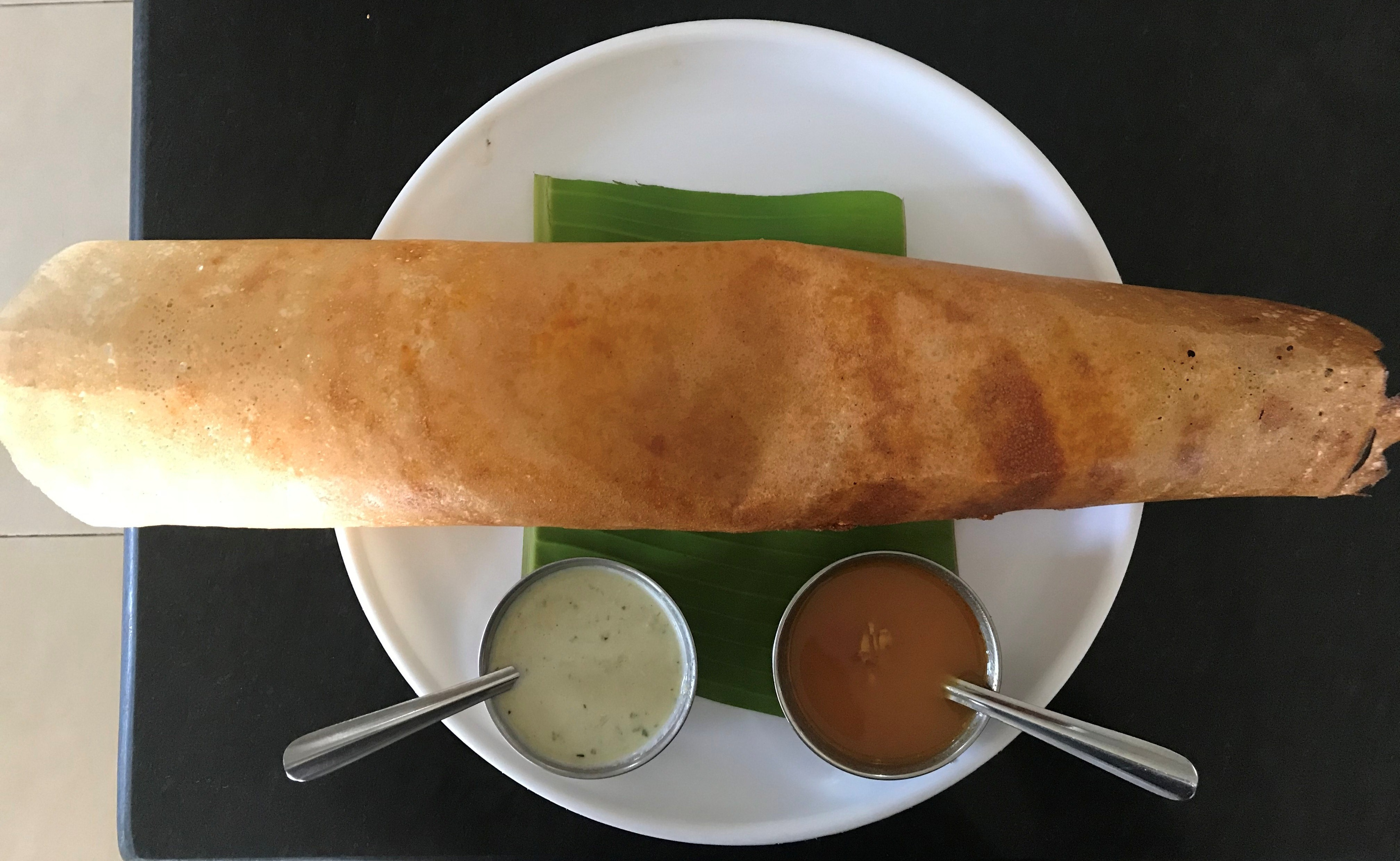
Masala dosa is popular breakfast with origins in Karnataka

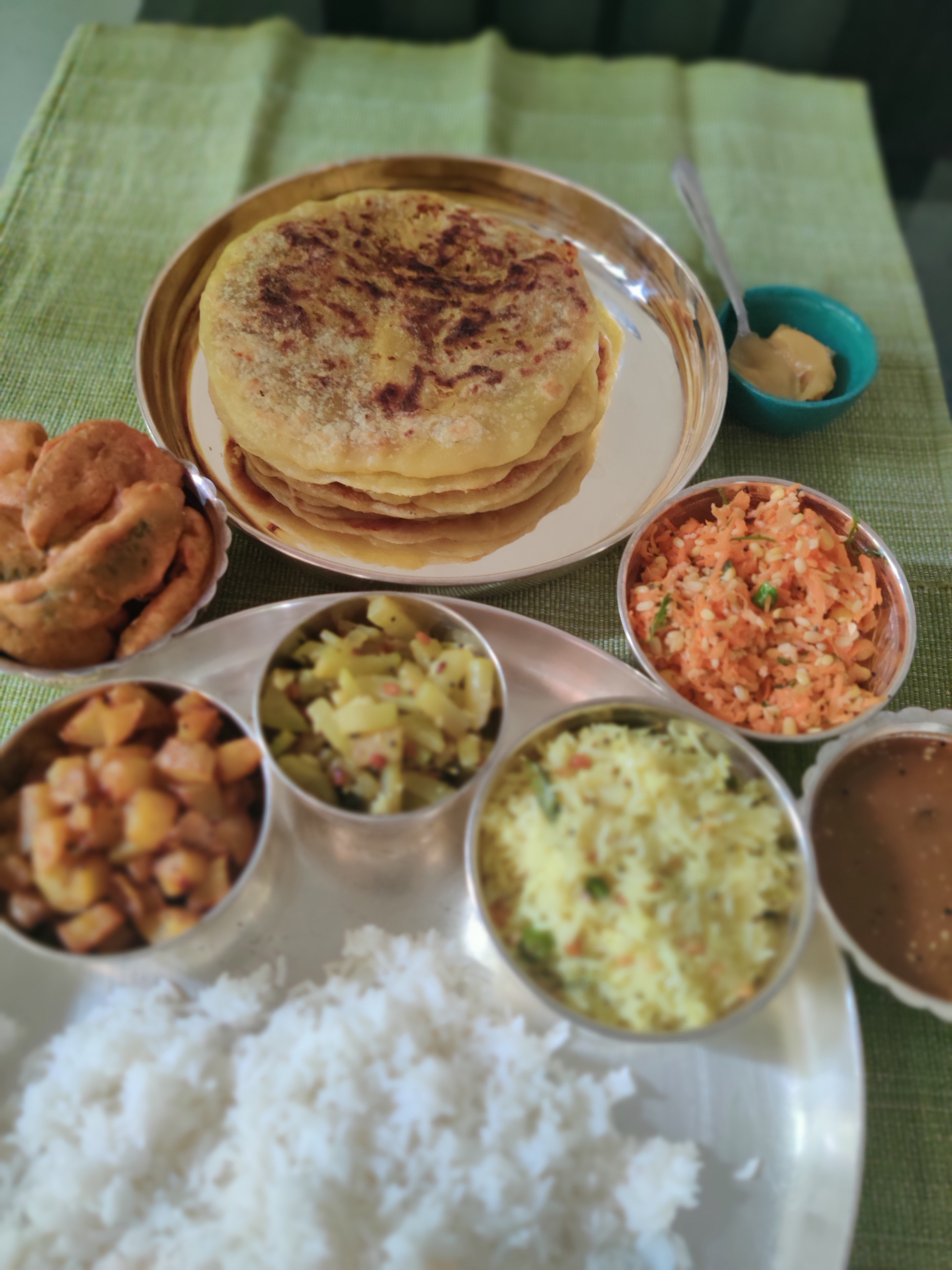
Rice served with side-dishes; palya, carrot kosambari salad, holigae sweet, and fried chili fitters.

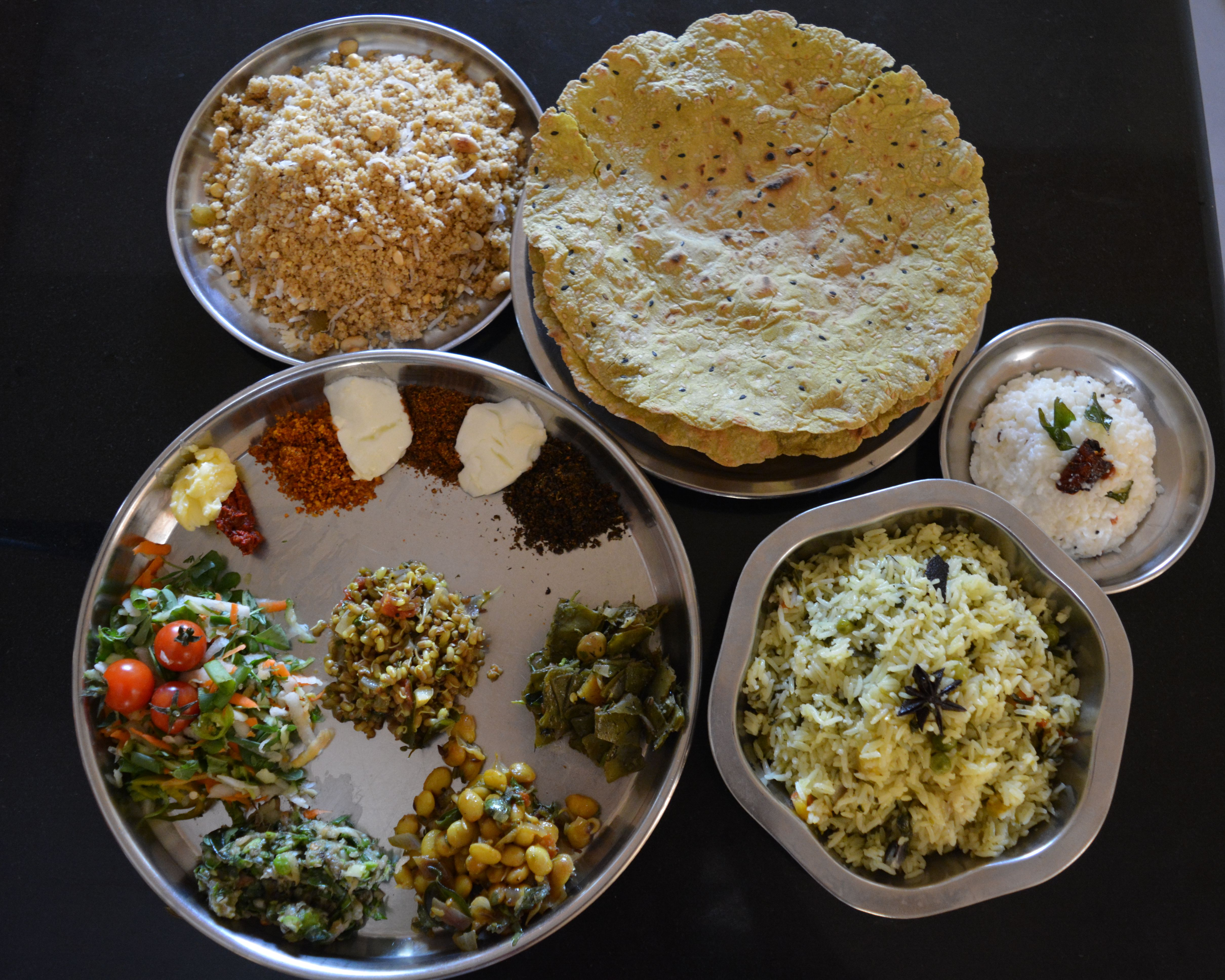
North Karnataka and Central Karnataka staple; kadak roti, served with various palya, chutney podi with yogurt, seasoned rice, and madli.

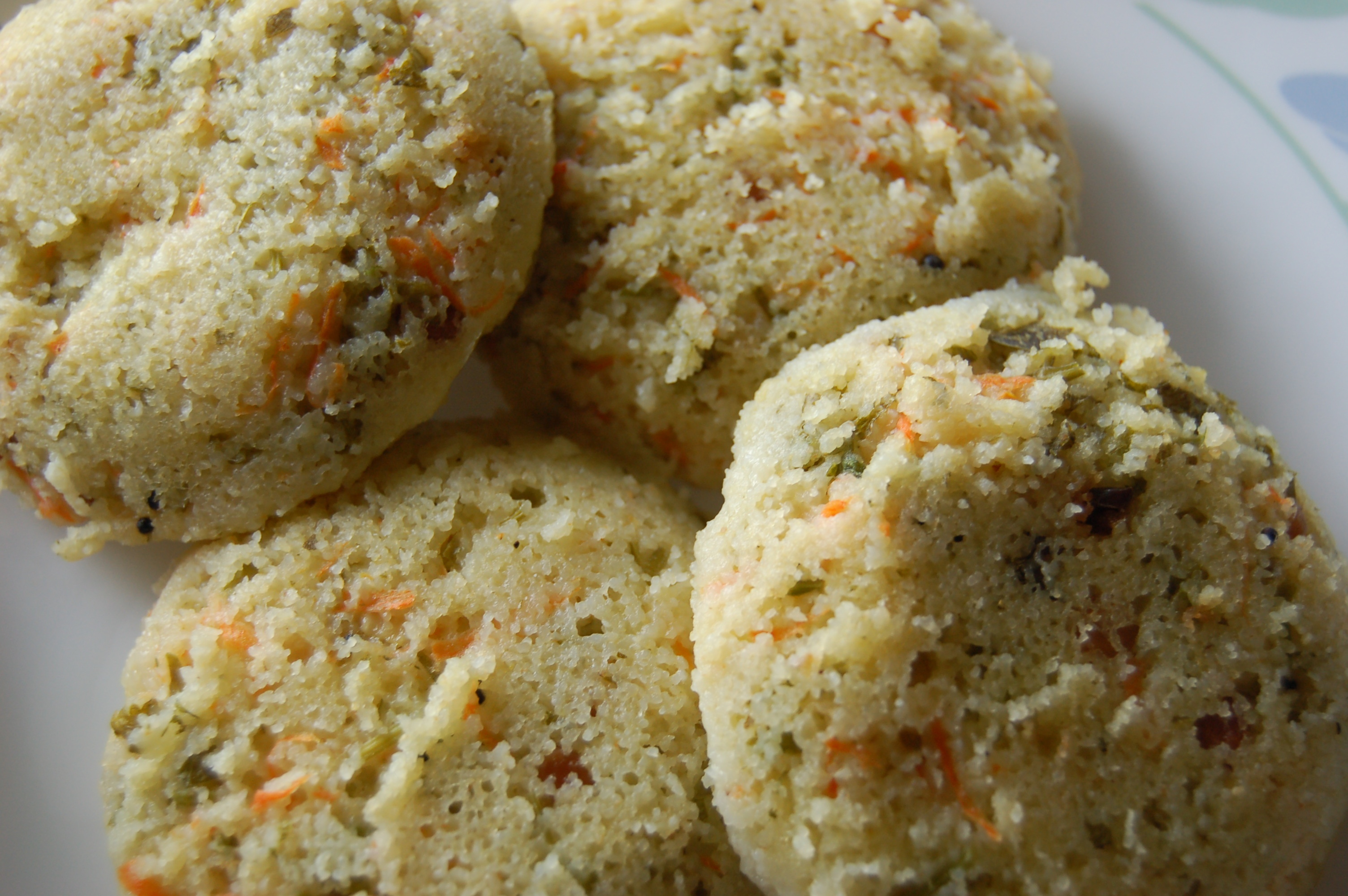
Rava idli is a variation of Idli with origins in Karnataka

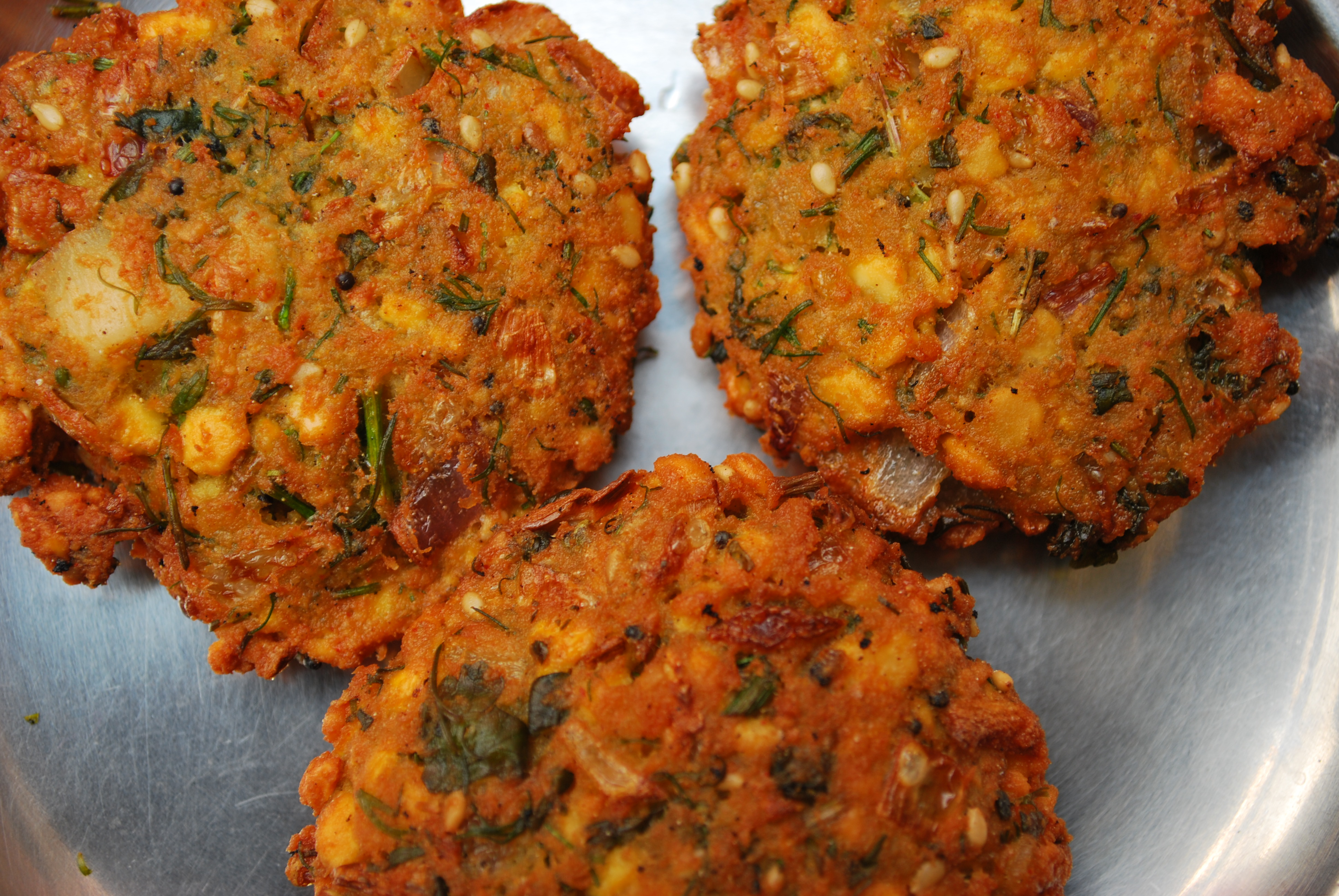
Ambode is popular lentil fried-fitters

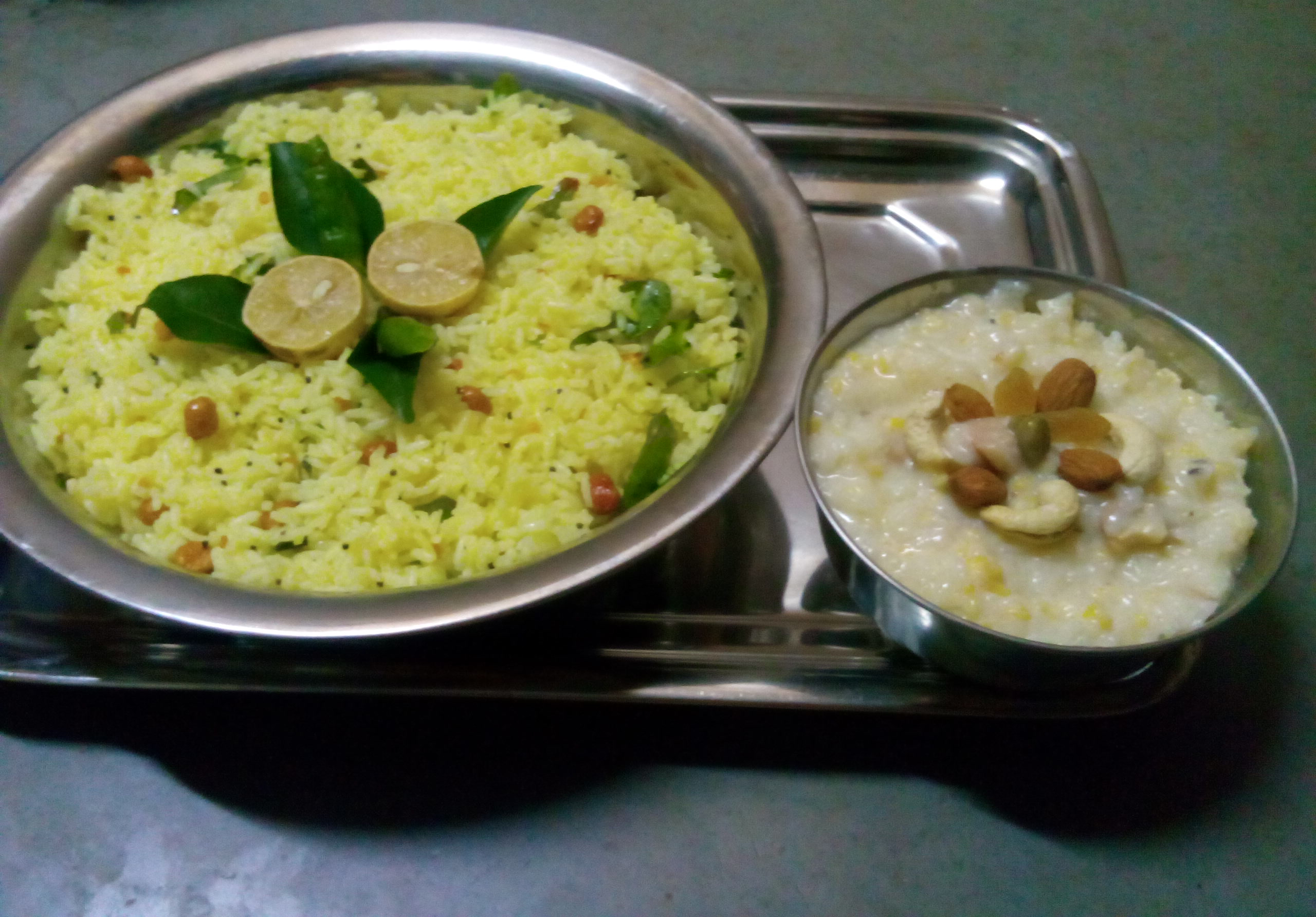
Chitranna is popular seasoned rice dish

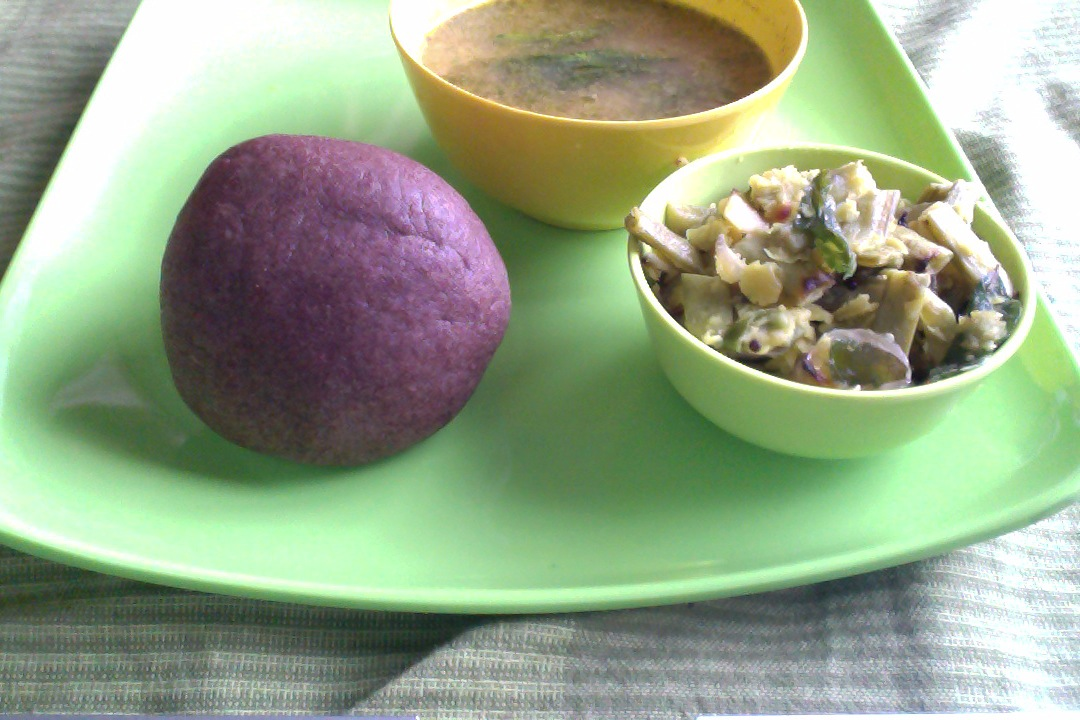
Ragi mudde with bassaaru

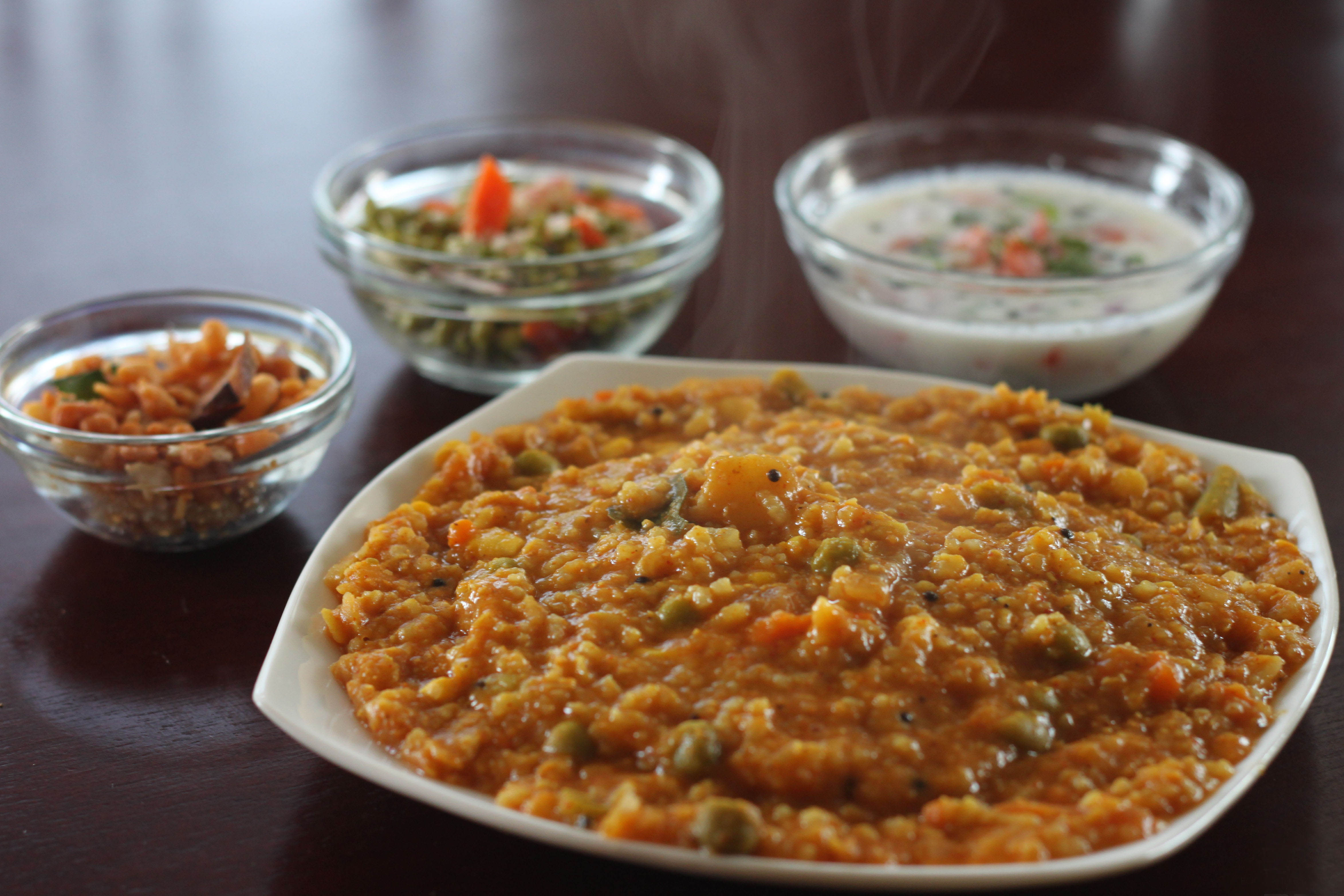
Bisi belebhath, a well-known rice-lentil based stew dish
