= Patoleo =

Indian stuffed turmeric leaf wraps

Steamed patoleo, including one peeled, served with a bowl of ghee

Patoleo (singular: Patoli) are stuffed turmeric leaf wraps, a dish which is mostly prepared on the western coast of India. The main stuffing is made from freshly shredded coconut, rice flour paste, and palm jaggery; and cooked by wrapping and steaming in turmeric leaves.

== Hindu community ==
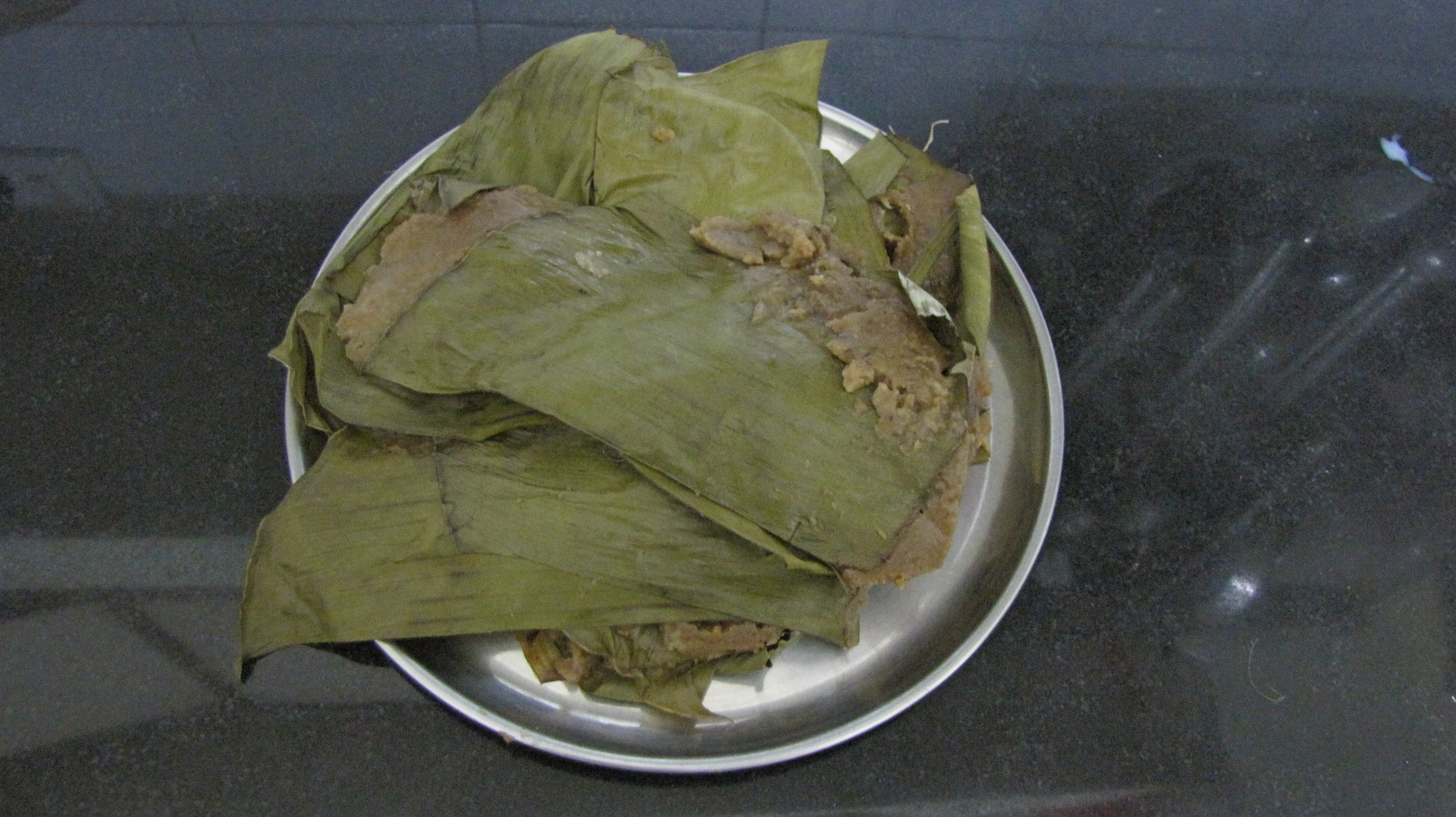
A home-made dish of sweet Patoleo, cooked in the style of the Chitrapur Saraswat Brahmin community.

Konkani-speaking Hindus prepare Patoleo on the second Sunday of Shravan, on Nag Panchami and on Hartalika, the eve of Ganesh Chaturthi. Salt-free Patoleo are offered to the Goddess Parvati, who, according to local legend, is said to have a strong craving for these sweets during her pregnancy.

Patoleo is traditionally served wrapped in its leaf on a dish. The leaf is removed before eating, and the sweet is commonly consumed as part of a vegetarian festive meal during Goan Hindu festivals. A similar dish called Ely Ada is made in Kerala for the festival of Onam.

== Christian community ==
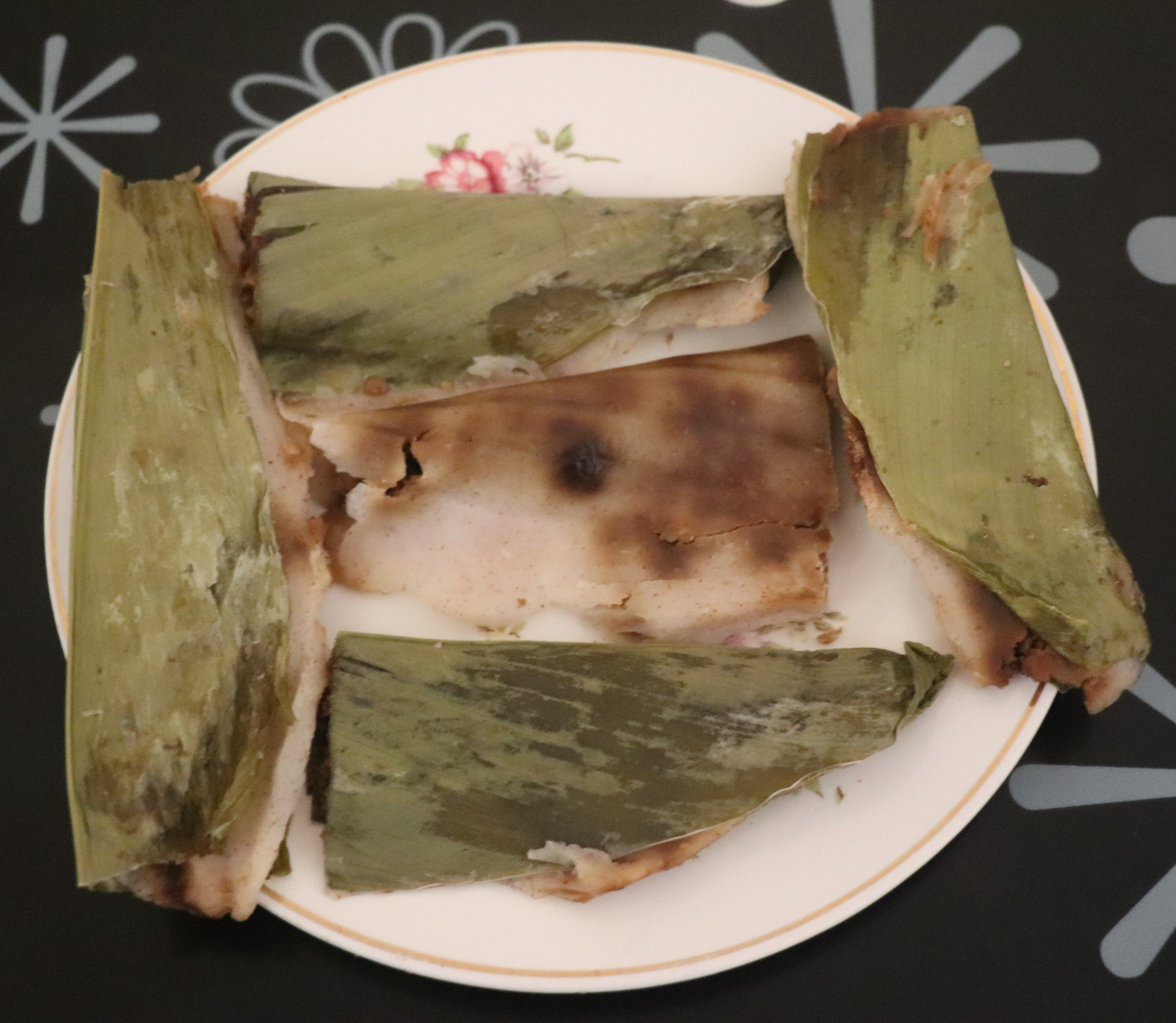
Patoleo prepared in Goan Catholic style. Pièce de résistance of the Assumption feast celebration.

The simplest version of the Goan Catholic Patoleo is prepared by smearing parboiled rice (ukadeñ tândul) paste on fresh turmeric leaves (hôldi pân) to which a filling of freshly grated coconut (chûn) and coconut jaggery (mâddâcheñ godd) is added. The leaves are then folded, sealed and steamed, traditionally in a utensil known as chondrõ. These are served hot on a platter with the leaves on and eaten after peeling them off. They are often accompanied with tea or other hot beverages.

The Catholic feast of the Assumption of the Blessed Virgin Mary (a holy day of obligation) which falls on 15 August coincides with the Independence Day of India. It is a feast held dearly by the Goan Catholic community, as many villages across Goa celebrate Konsâcheñ fest (harvest festival) on this day and Patoleo are the star dish of the celebration. It is also prepared in Goa on the feast of São João (Nativity of St John the Baptist) which falls on 24 June.

Patoleo are sent with Vojeñ (bridal trousseau) to the bridegroom's house by the Goan people; Catholics and Hindus alike. The tradition of distributing Patoleo to neighbours and friends after the arrival of a new born in the family is still retained by some Goans. In bygone times, Patoleo were also distributed to mark the completion of construction of a house in Goa. Some Goan Catholic families send Patoleo to a house where people are mourning the death of a family member. Before modern medicine, Patoleo was used as a traditional remedy for whooping cough.

East Indian Catholics call it Pân Mori or 'East Indian leaf cakes' and the Mangalorean Catholic community calls it Patoli (ಪಾತೊಳಿ) in Kannada.

== Gallery ==
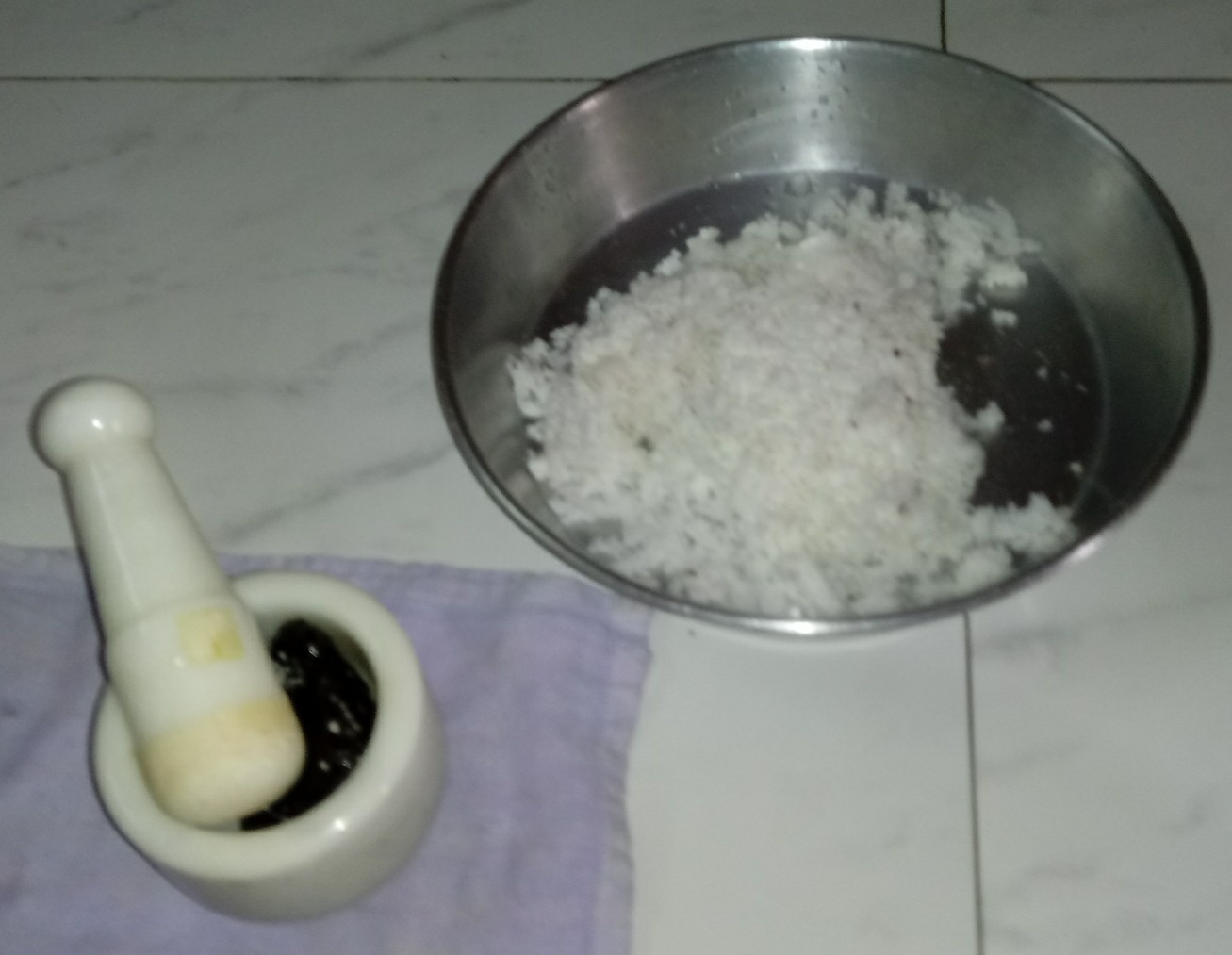
Grated coconut (soy) and palm jaggery (mâddâcheñ godd) in mortar and pestle

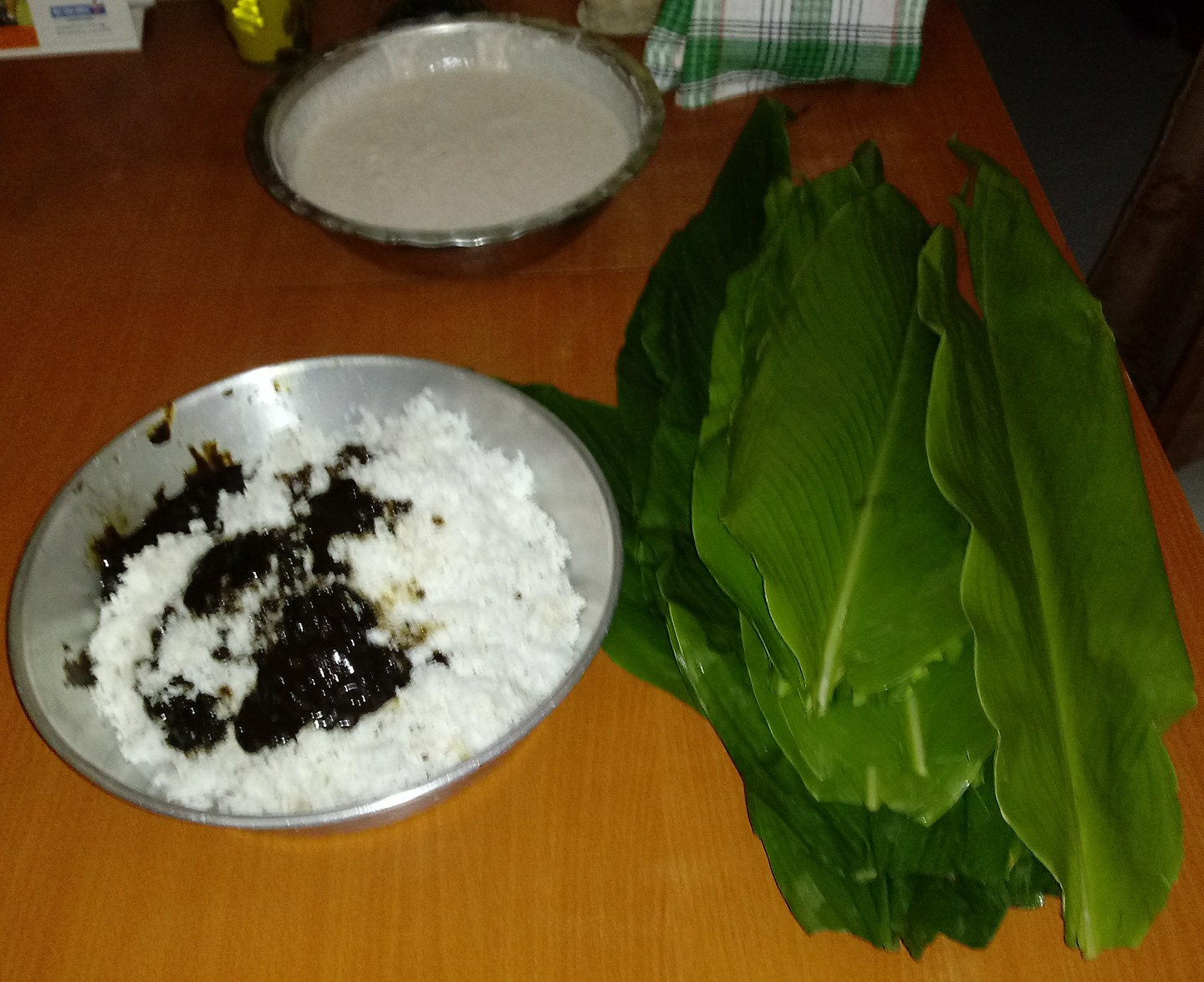
Mixing soy and mâddâncheñ godd

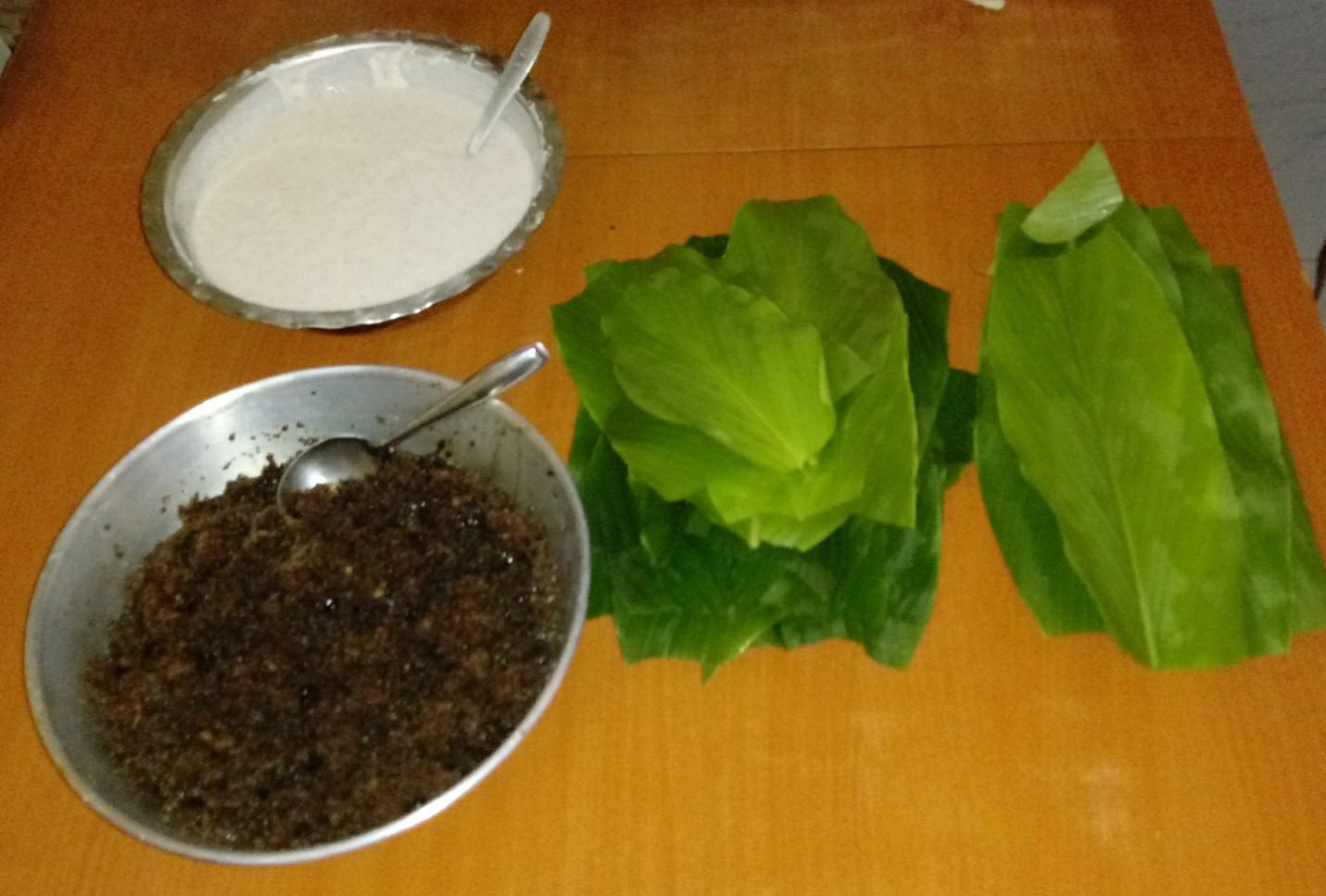
Parbolied (ukadeñ tândul) rice paste, jaggery-coconut mixture (chûn), and turmeric leaves (hôldi pân)

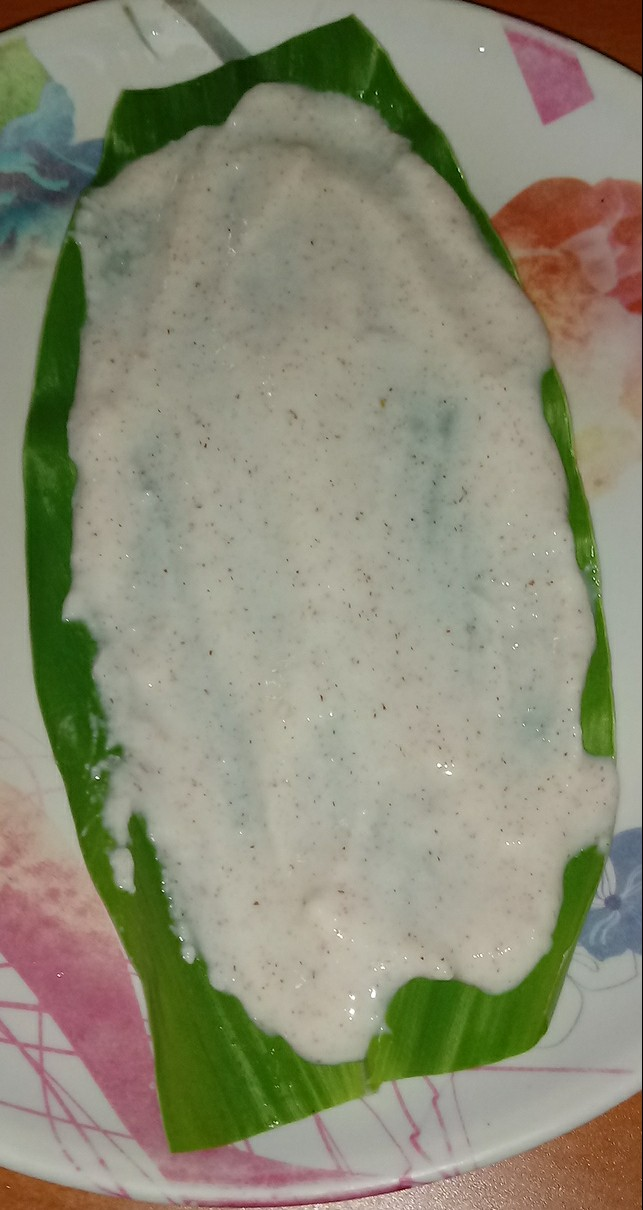
Ukadeñ tândul paste smeared on Hôldi pân

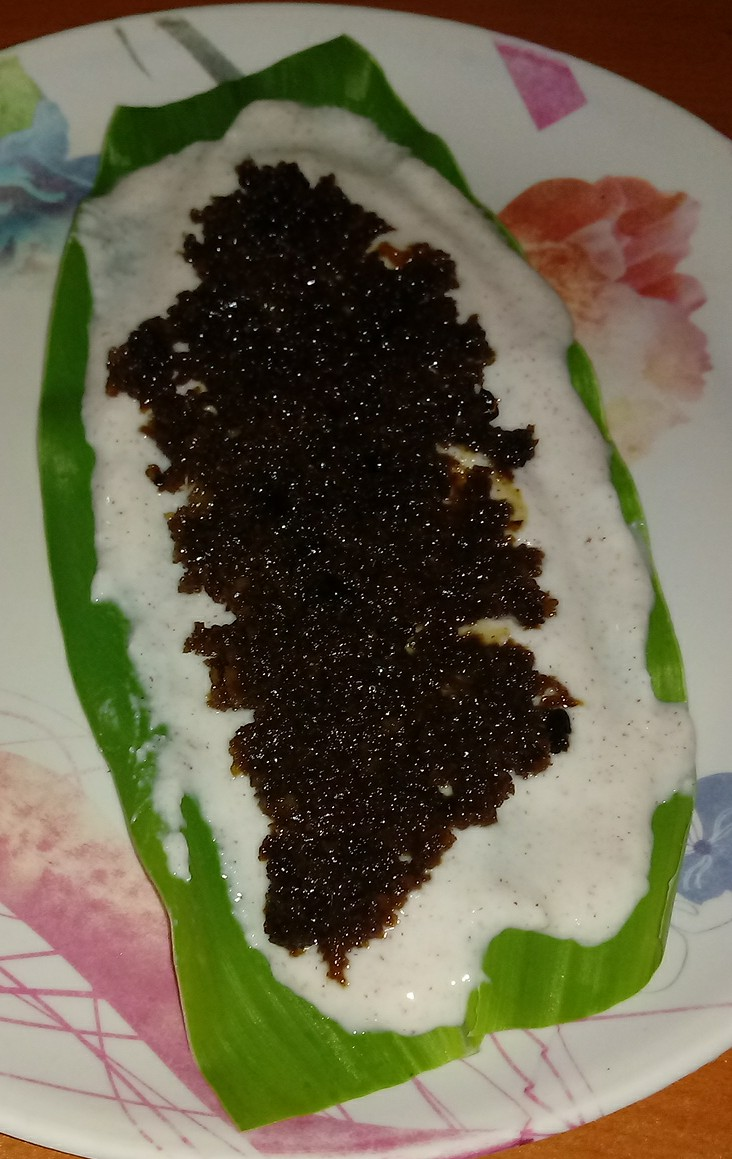
Chûn and rice paste smeared on turmeric leaf

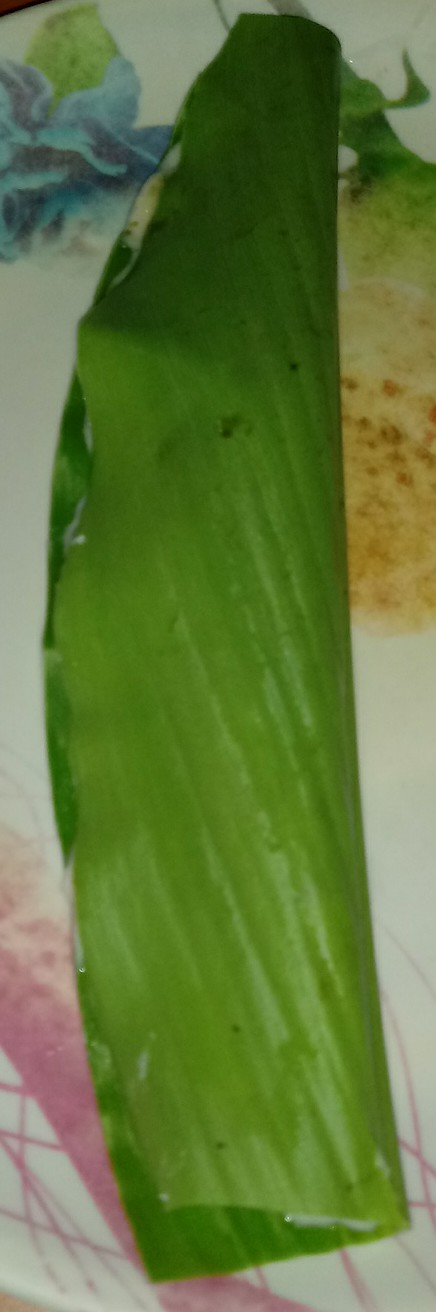
Patoli before steaming

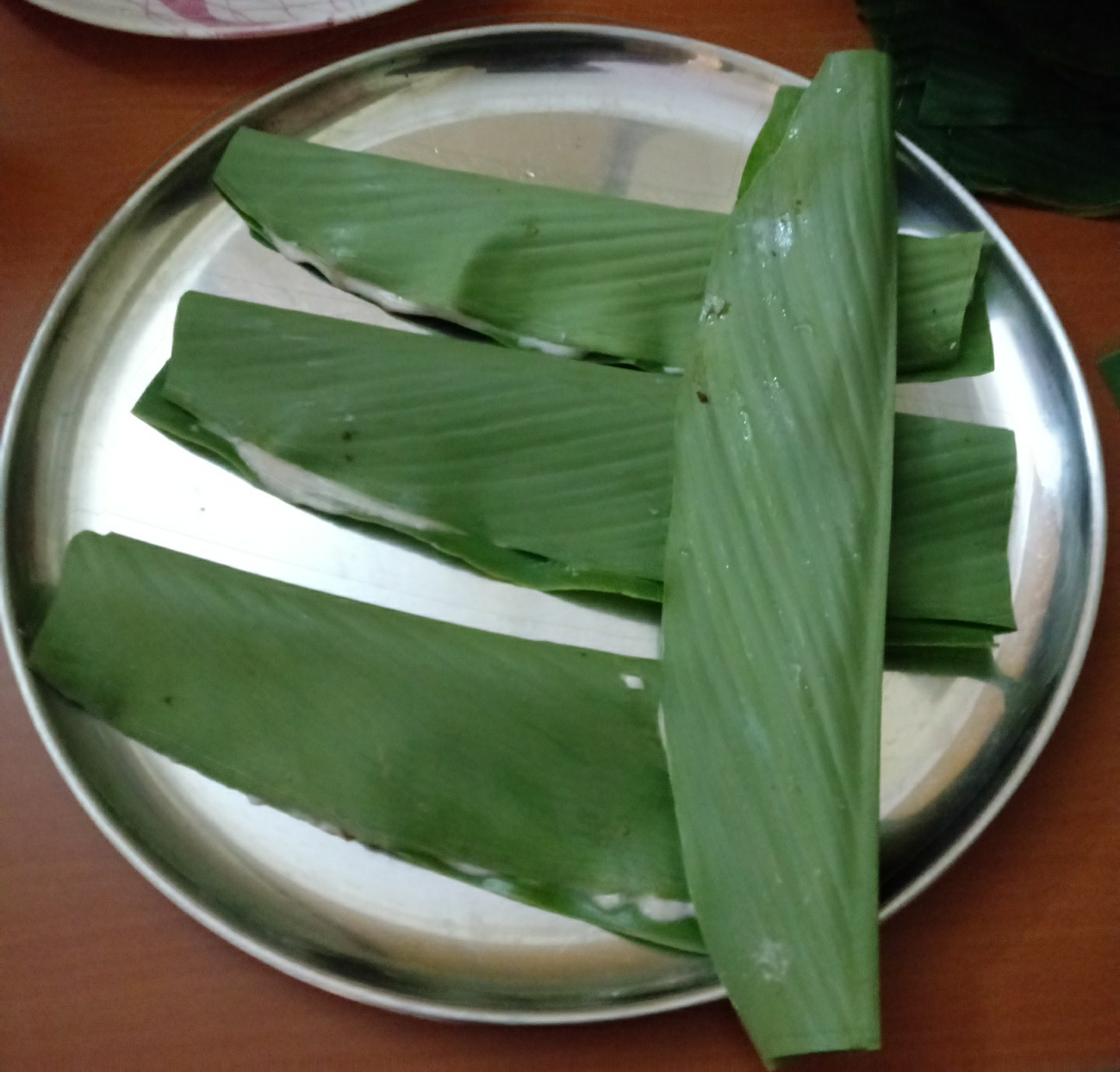
Patoleo before steaming

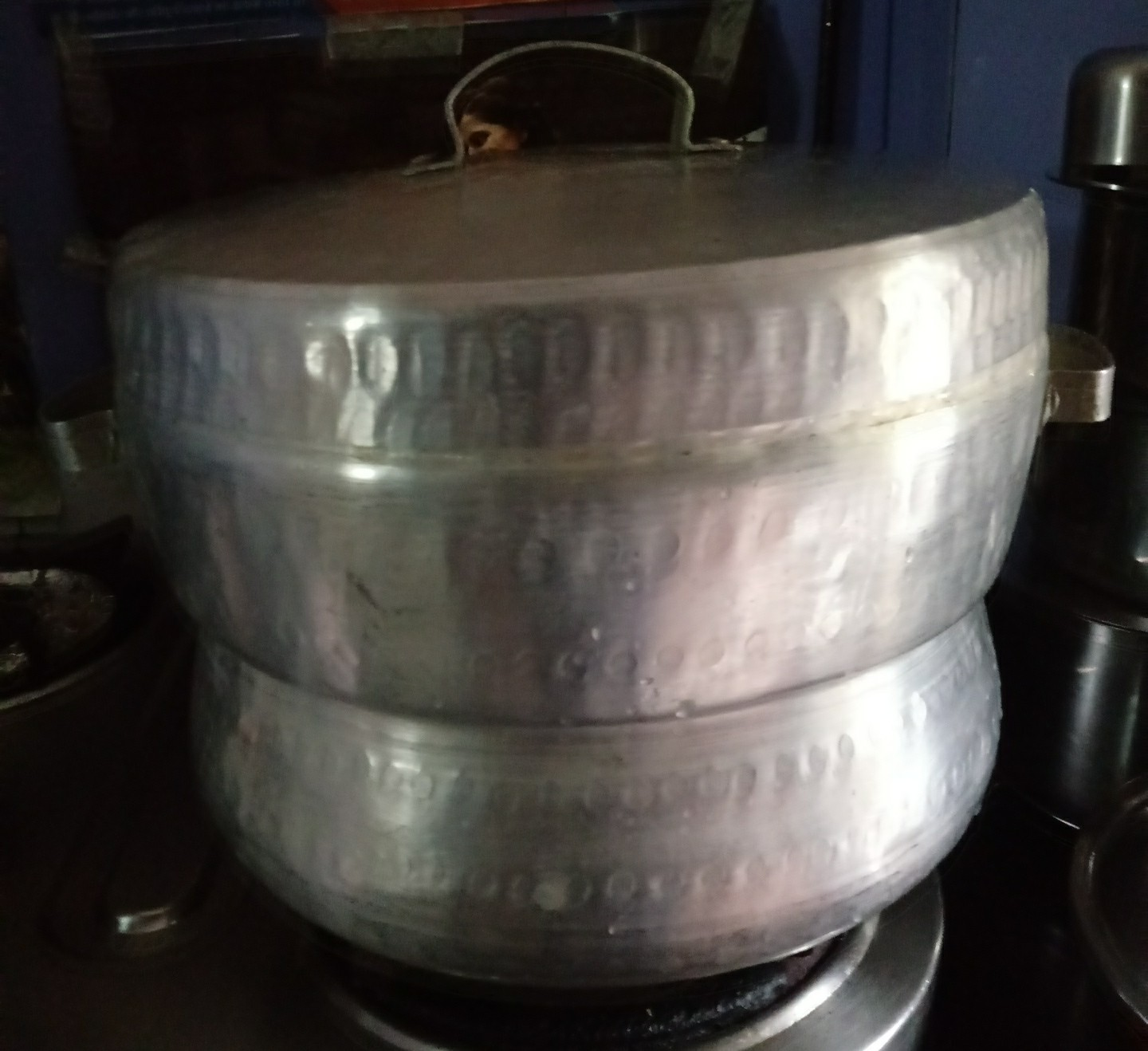
Chondrõ steamer

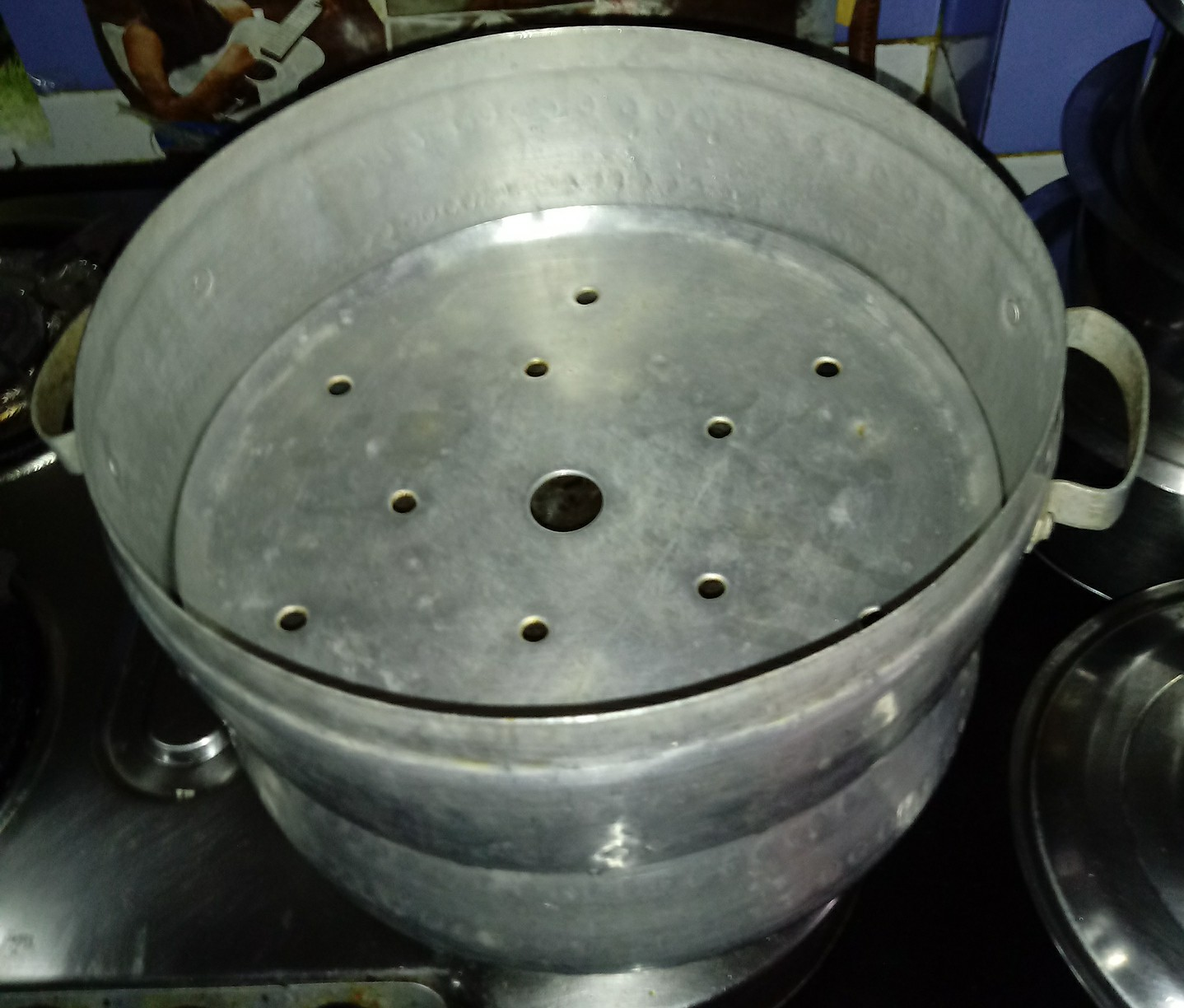
Opened chondrõ

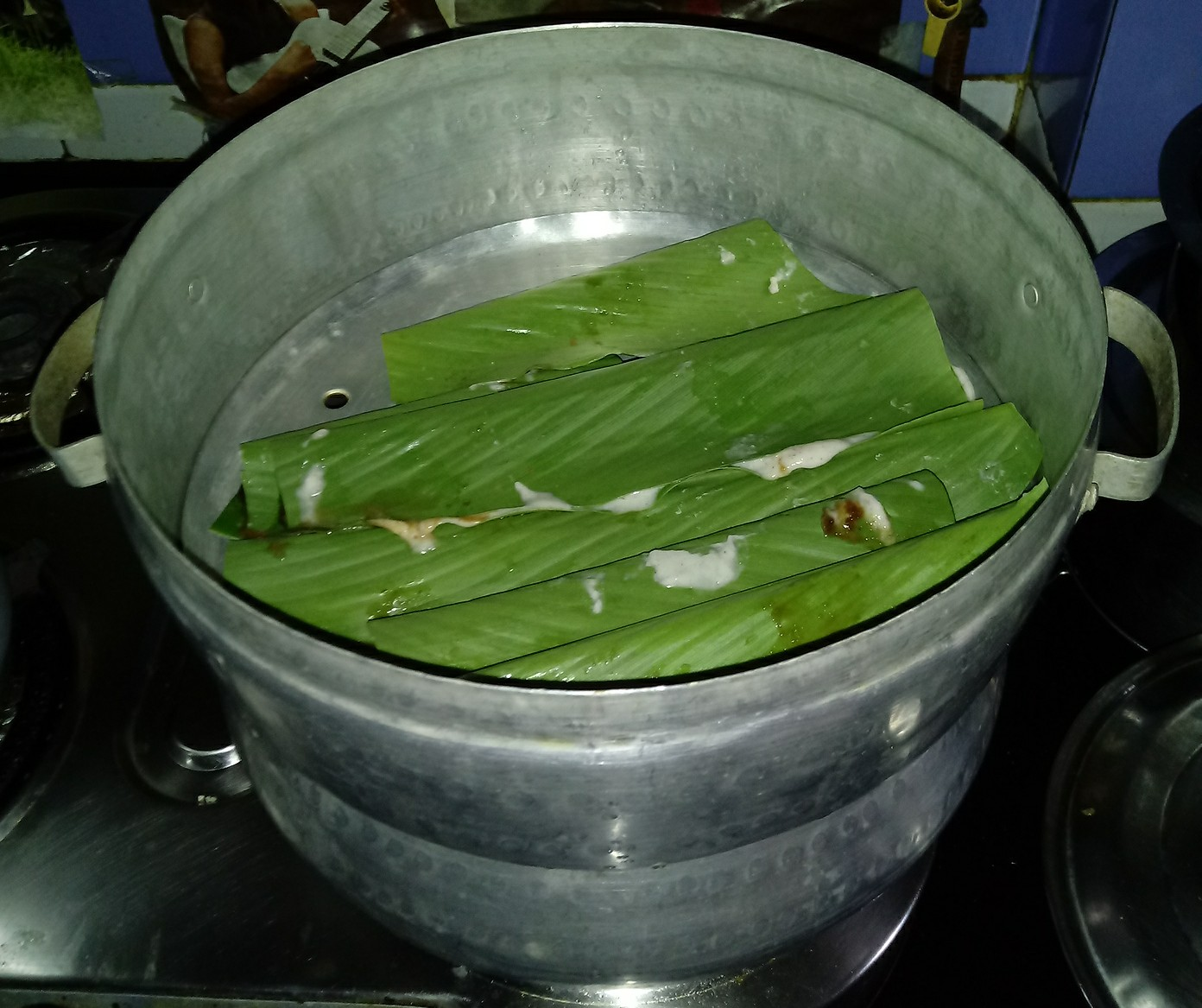
Patoleo placed for steaming

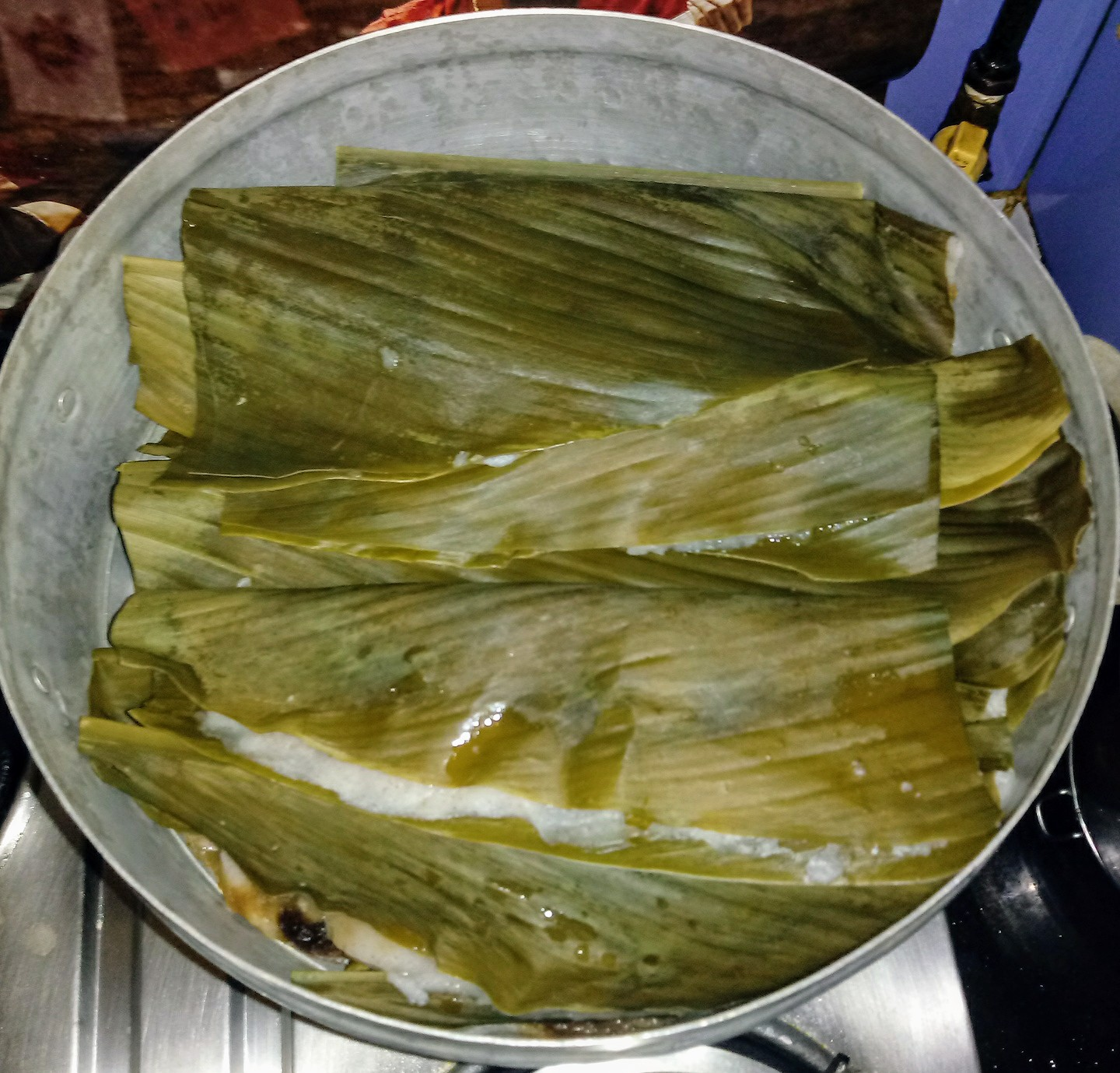
Steamed patoleo in chondrõ

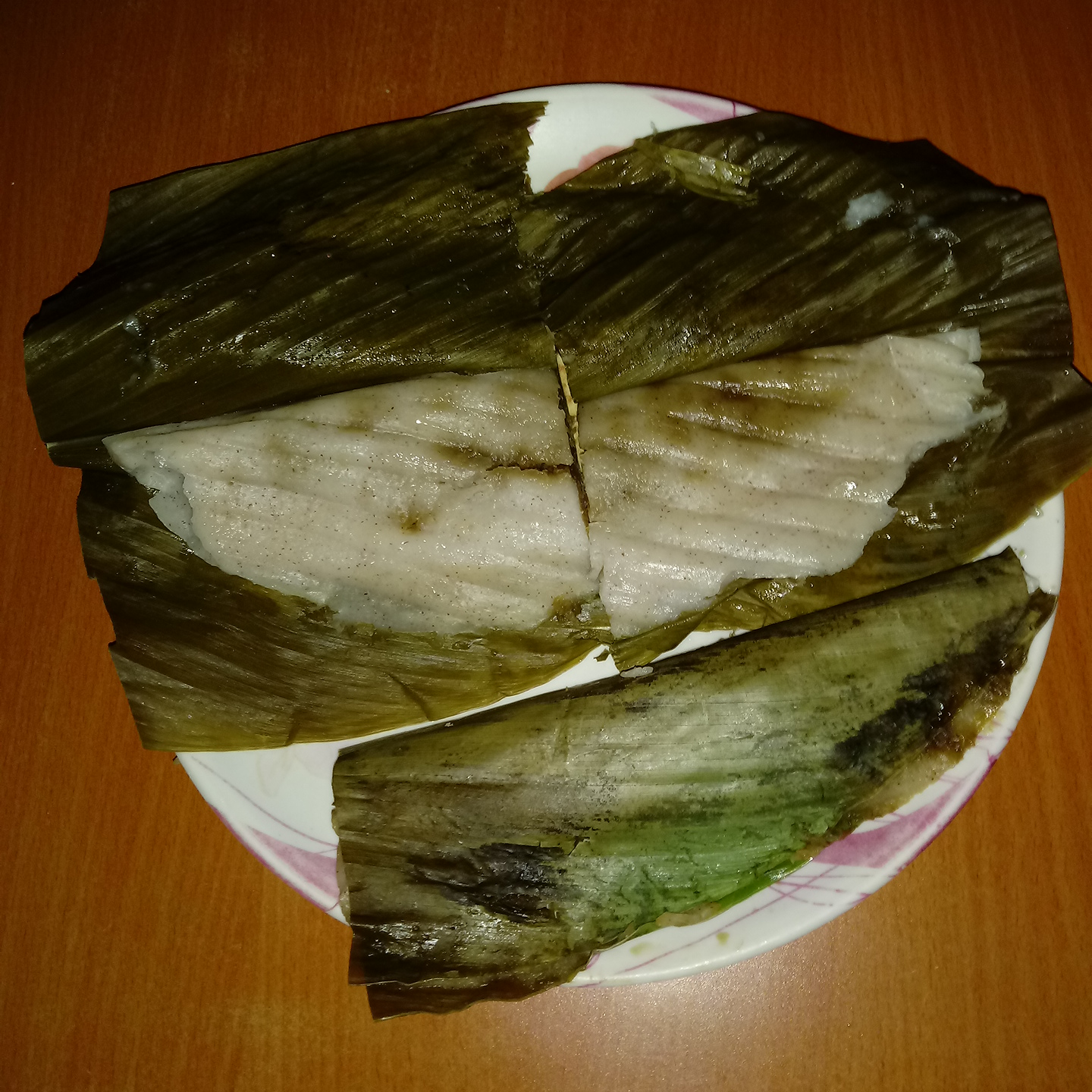
Patoleo ready to be eaten after peeling the leaves

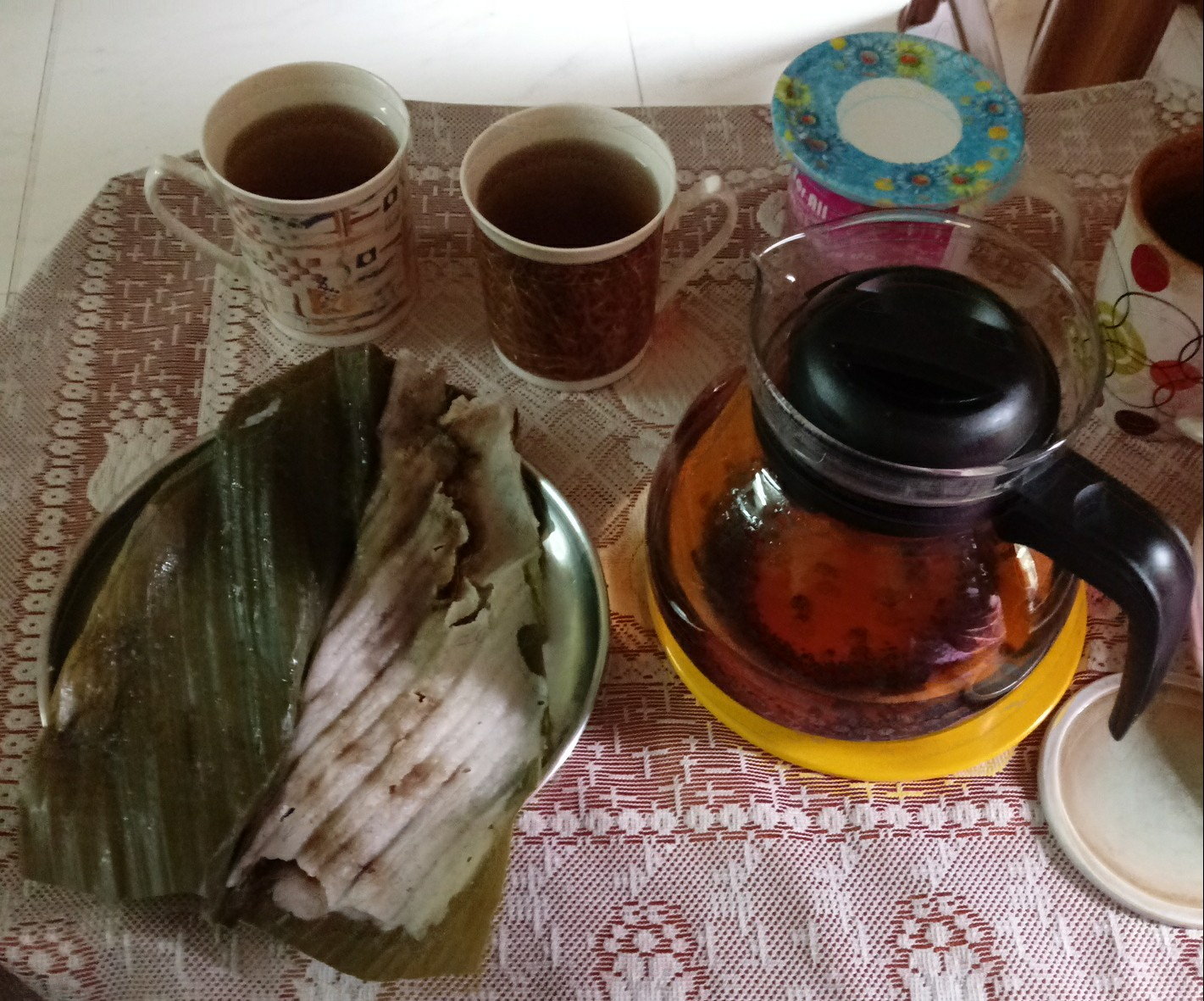
Unsweetened black tea and patoleo
