= Surnoli =

Sweet Indian pancake

Surnali made from rice, flattened rice, and fenugreek seeds

Surnoli or Surnali is a sweet Indian pancake popular among the Konkani community. Surnolis are yellow with a puffy texture and holes, and are a traditional Saraswat Brahmin dish. Surnolis are typically eaten for breakfast or afternoon tea, served with homemade butter.

== Preparation ==
Surnoli batter is made by grinding together soaked rice mixed with flattened rice, coconut, buttermilk, jaggery and turmeric into a smooth paste. The batter is fermented overnight and cooked covered on a griddle on one side.

== See also ==
- Dosa
