= Telangana cuisine =

Cuisine of Telangana, India

Telangana cuisine is the cuisine native to the Indian state of Telangana. The Telangana state lies on the Deccan plateau and its topography dictates more millets and roti based dishes. Jowar and Bajra feature more prominently in their cuisine. Rice also is a staple.

== Staple food ==
Telangana in its cuisine, there is special place for rotis made from millet, such as jonna rotte (sorghum), sajja rotte (penisetum), or Sarva Pindi" and Uppudi Pindi (broken rice). In Telangana a gravy or curry is called Koora and Pulusu is based on tamarind. A deep fry reduction of the same is called Vepudu. Kodi pulusu and vepudu are popular dishes in meat. Vankaya (Brinjal), Alugadda (potato) koora & fry are some of the many varieties of vegetable dishes. Telangana palakoora is a spinach dish cooked with lentils eaten with steamed rice and roti. Peanuts are added as special attraction and in Karimnagar District, peanuts and soya nuts are added.

Popular Telangana curry dishes (known as Koora) include Boti (derived from mutton) and Punti Koora made out of Red Sorrel leaves. Potlakaya pulusu, or snake gourd stew is one of the daily staple dish. Many Telangana dishes are altered as per their own taste but the root ingredients are similar. Sakinalu is the most popular snack made of rice flour during festivals like Dusshera and Sankranthi making it very delicious and one of its kind fritters of South India.

Recent years have seen a resurgence of Telangana cuisines in restaurants around Hyderabad with the availability of Telangana thali dish for lunch.

== Vegetarian food ==
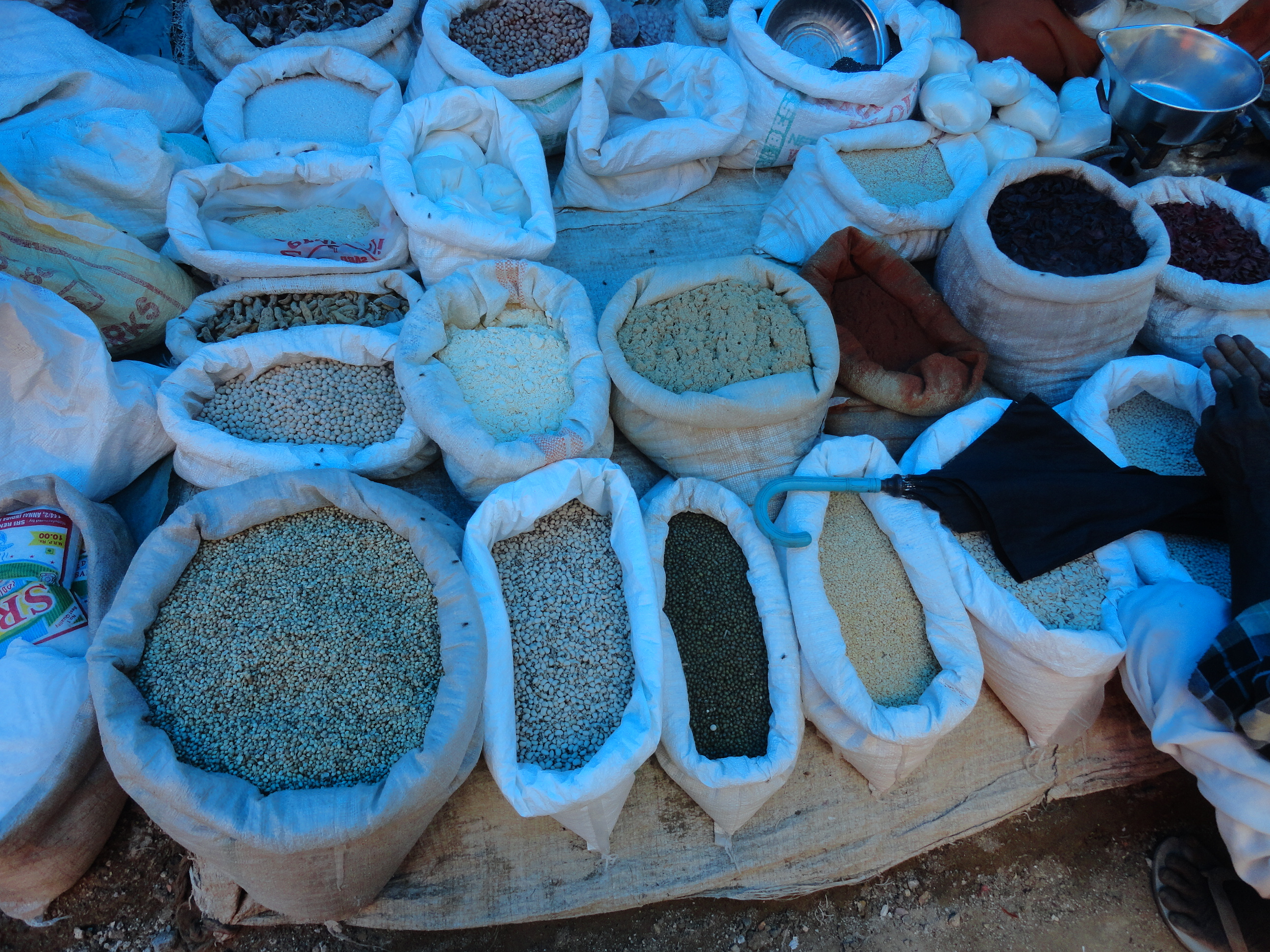
Various types of Lentils (Pappulu) and millets for sale in market

In Telangana regions Tamarind, red chilies (erra karam), green chilies (paccha karam) and Asafoetida (hing) are predominantly used in Telangana cooking. Roselle is a major staple used extensively in curries and pickles.

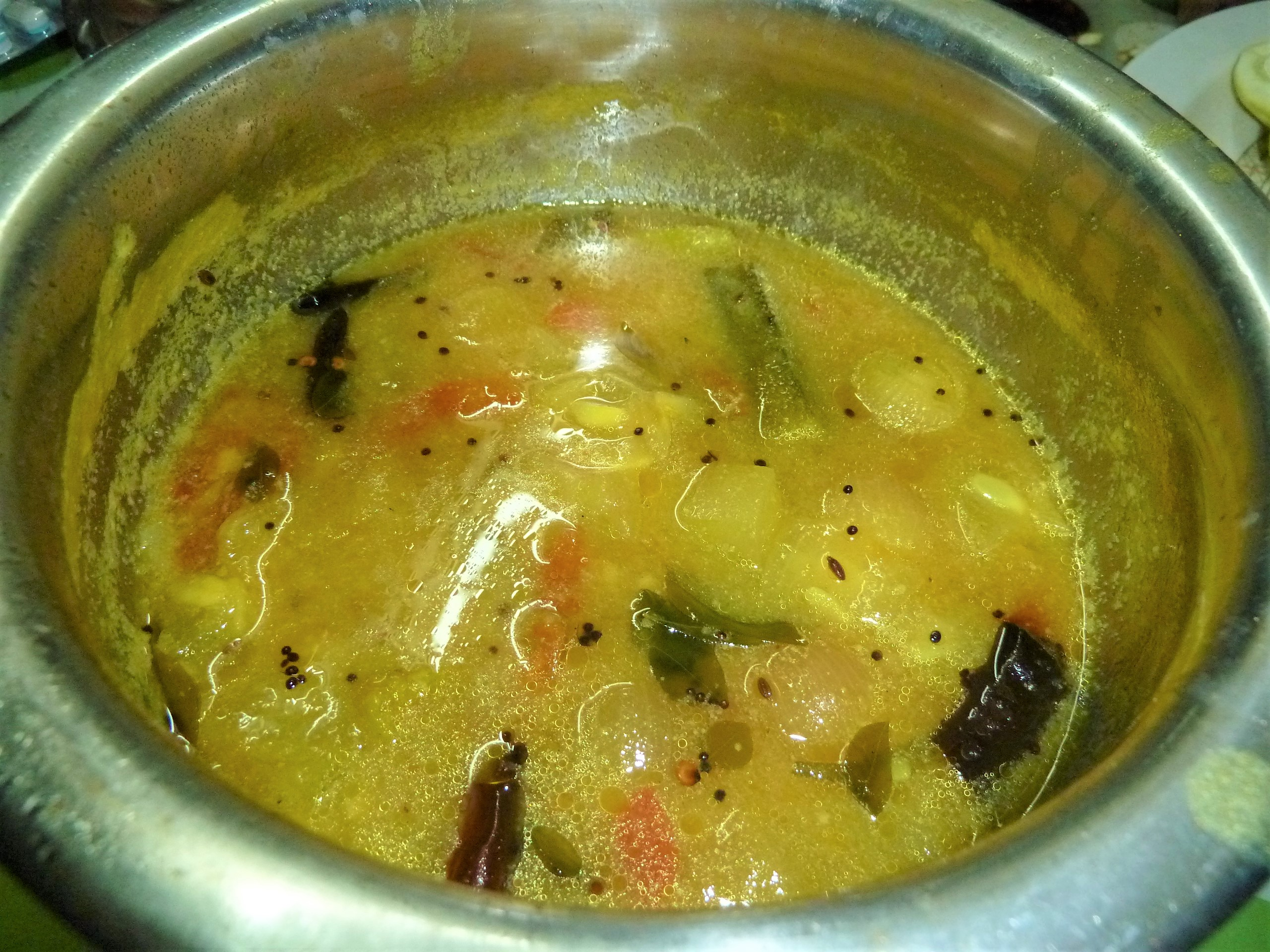
Pesara (moong-dal) Pappu

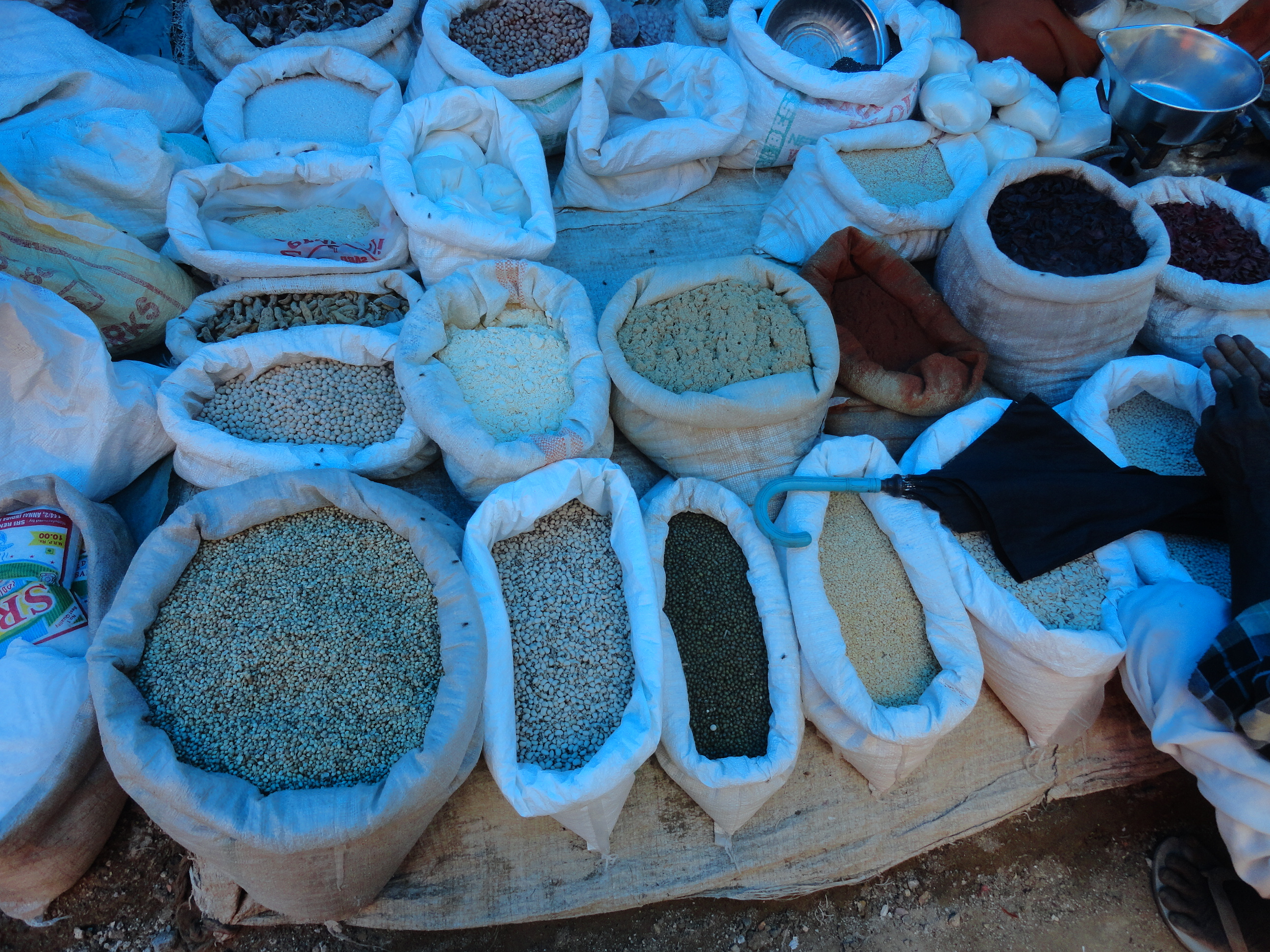
Various types of lentils (pappulu) and millet for sale at a market

- Sarva pindi, a spicy bread , is a common breakfast, made from rice flour, chana dal, ginger, garlic, sesame seeds, curry leaves, and green chilis.
- Pachi pulusu, a spicy, raw rasam made with tamarind, chili, and onions. Jaggery is also preferred to be added in some parts. Prepared mainly in summer.
- Kodi gudla pulusu, boiled eggs cooked in a tangy tamarind sauce combined with spices
