= Bisi Bele Bhat =

Rice-based dish with origins in the state of Karnataka, India

Bisi bele bath
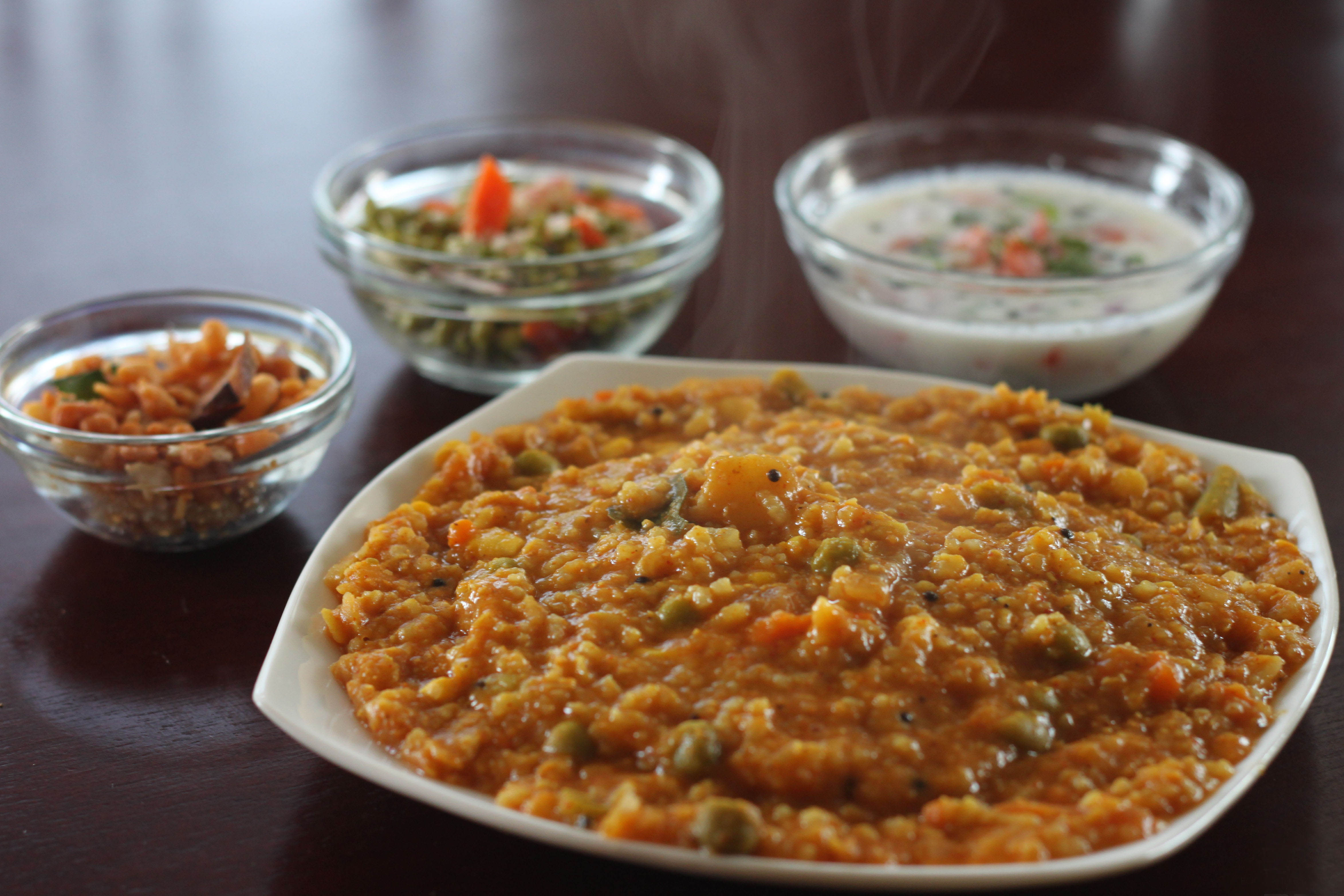
- Fresh bisi bele bhath
- Place of origin: Karnataka, India

Bisi bele bhath (Kannada: ಬಿಸಿ ಬೇಳೆ ಭಾತ್, romanized: bisi bēl̥e bhāt, lit. 'hot lentil [boiled] rice') is a spicy, rice-based dish with origins in the state of Karnataka, India. It is said to have originated in the Mysore Palace. Its recipe was almost a secret among palace cooks for two centuries until it would become public and famous across the world.

== Preparation ==
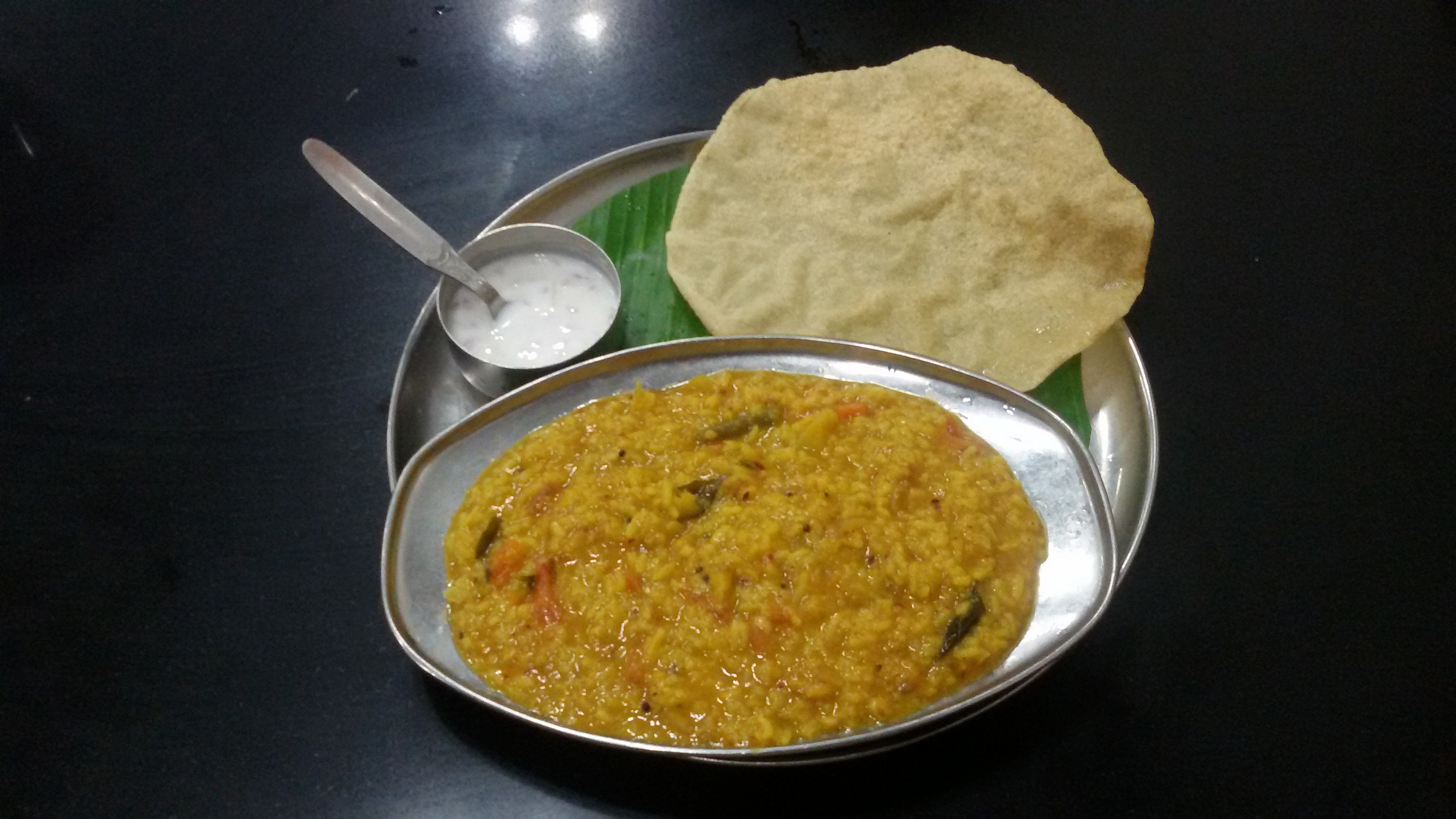
Bisi bele bhaath served with raita and Happala(papad)

The traditional preparation of this dish is elaborate and involves the use of a spicy masala (huliyanna), toor dal (a type of lentil), rice, ghee and vegetables. Spices like nutmeg, asafoetida, curry leaves and tamarind pulp contribute to its unique flavour and taste. Some versions of the dish are prepared with up to thirty ingredients.

It is served hot and sometimes eaten with chutney, boondi, salad, papad, or potato chips. This dish is commonly found in restaurants that serve the Udupi cuisine. The masala used is available off the shelf.

== See also ==
- Cuisine of Karnataka
- List of rice dishes
