= Saraswat cuisine =

Cuisine of Saraswat Brahmins

Saraswat cuisine is the cuisine of the Saraswat Brahmins from the Konkan region on the western coast of India. It differs between the Saraswat Brahmin subsects and across the Konkan-Canara region, which includes Uttara Kannada, Udupi district, Dakshina Kannada, Damaon, and Goa. The cuisine is served in restaurants along the western coast of India, especially in Bombay and Bangalore. Each variation uses the vegetables and fruits available in its region. Saraswat cooking is largely pesco-vegetarian: the meat of land animals is avoided, but fish is not counted as meat. Fish features regularly in Gowd Saraswat meals. Acharyas and purohits follow a strictly saatvik vegetarian diet. Gowd Saraswat Brahmins traditionally refer to fish as "sea vegetables".

== Lacto-vegetarian Saraswat cuisine ==
Their curries use a lot of coconut, coconut oil, tamarind, kokum and curry leaves and the cuisine is largely influenced by South Indian cuisine. Sourness comes from tamarind or kokum, or from fruit in season such as hog plum, bilimbi and unripe mango. The cuisine is very similar to Malvani cuisine of southern Konkan and Udupi or Mangalorean cuisine. Hooman ani xit (fish curry and steamed rice) is the staple food of the Saraswat Brahmins of Goa, whereas the regular consumption of Indian breads such as puris, chapatis and parathas are seen mainly amongst the Saraswat Brahmin of Maharashtra, India. One Saraswat sub-sect, the Sattvik Brahmins, keeps onions, garlic and potatoes out of its vegetarian food, which makes it comparable to Jain cooking. Dishes such as Savalem raandaap are prepared among the Bhats (Priests), conservative Goud Saraswat Brahmins and Chitrapur Saraswat Brahmins. Most Konkani families follow this style of cooking on festivals such as Ganesh Chaturthi. On certain days (Mondays in particular), some Saraswat Brahmins eat only vegetarian food. This is particularly true in families whose Kuldevta (clan deity) or other family deity is Mangesh, Nagueshi or another form of Mahadeva Shiva. In Punjab and Jammu region, Saraswat Brahmins traditionally observe a strict lacto-vegetarian diet.

== Various Saraswat cuisines ==
=== Rajapur Saraswat cuisine ===
This cuisine forms a part of lacto-vegetarian cuisine. This cuisine has the combination of Goan, Udupi and Malvani cuisine culture. Khatkhatem, a stew containing at least six vegetables, is popular. Other popular dishes include bhaji or shaak (made from different vegetable curry and fruit), vaal bhaji (a curry/dish made out of drumsticks) usli/Usal (spicy pulses in a thin watery gravy), misal (usal topped with fried snacks), tondak (beans combined with cashews), rass (coconut-based dishes), undri (a dish made out of rice flour, jaggery, and coconut), ghawan (a special variant of dosa, which is similar to neer dose, a Tuluva dish) hoomans (different types of curries), karams (vegetable salads), lonche (Indian pickles) and papads/happal (flatbread). Fasting foods include Moongacho gathi (curried green gram), botatyache patal bhaji (potato curry), tur dal ross (split pigeon pea curry), etc.

=== Chitrapur Saraswat cuisine ===
Chitrapur Saraswats eat mostly vegetarian food, and only a small number of their dishes use fish. In 1943 the Saraswat Mahila Samaj brought out Rasachandrika, a collection of Chitrapur Saraswat recipes; by 2018 the Marathi version had reached its ninth printing, and Hindi and English translations had also appeared. These are recipes that would have been passed down from mother to daughter or daughter-in-law. The cuisine consists either of curries and vegetables made with ground fresh coconut gratings or tempered beans, sprouts, pulses (dals) garnished with coconut gratings. For sourness, Chitrapur cooks reach for tamarind rather than lime or kokum, and they use dried Byadagi chillies instead of chilli powder.

Typical Bhanap or Amchi (as the Chitrapur Saraswats refer to themselves) dishes are:

- Batata Song (potatoes cooked with tamarind, onions, garlic, chili powder and turmeric)
- Dalithoy
- Patoleo
- Patrode
- Surnoli
- Kairus (ground coconut base with spices, capsicum, potatoes, tamarind, peanuts and cashews)
- Sukke (ground coconut base, spices and a variety of vegetables like potatoes)
- Knolkhol (kohlrabi), peas, cauliflower, okra
- Ambat
- Ghashees
- Mango pickle made with unripe Apinmedi mango

== Pesco-vegetarian cuisine ==
Gowd Saraswat Brahmins do not regard fish as non-vegetarian food. In one legend the community was vegetarian until the Saraswati River dried up; those left unable to farm were then allowed seafood, and fish were politely renamed "sea vegetables".

A typical breakfast in a Saraswat home may include pez (congee) of ukdem tandhul (parboiled rice) and lonche (pickles) and papad. Some homes serve dosa, idli (in South Canara, Karnataka and other parts of South India) or sannas (in Goa), along with chutney or sambhar. Shevaiyn phann or phow are other breakfast foods occasionally served. Rotis and bhakris are typical types of bread eaten along with tondak or seasoned batatabhaji (potato stir-fry preparation).

Lunch and dinner may feature daat dalitoi and rice (xit, pronounced sheeth) in a Dorke's home, whereas Bhanaps would prefer ambat with their rice for kalvani. A typical Saraswat lunch would have sheeth, roass or varann; if the diner is not vegetarian, lunch may include hoomann, bhaji, tondak, lonche, papodd, and toi or kadhi. Kadhi is made to serve the dual purpose of mukhashuddhhi (mouth purification) and jeervonn (digestive kadhis include asafoetida, vomvom, jeera, fennel seed). Sometimes the kadhis are seasoned simply with karivel and sanswam (mustard seeds). Typically, this is a watery preparation which the luncher cups in his hand as it is poured onto his plate and drinks it before mixing a small portion of his rice with it to eat at the end of the meal. The most popular kadhi among Konkani Saraswat Brahmins is the kokumachi kadhi or konkam kadhi. Kokum is a fruit found and grown within the western Konkan coast of India and is commonly used in Saraswat cuisine.

== See also ==
- Goan cuisine
- Bengali cuisine
- Chitrapur Saraswat Brahmin
- Gaud Saraswat Brahmin
- Rajapur Saraswat Brahmin
