= Majjige huli =

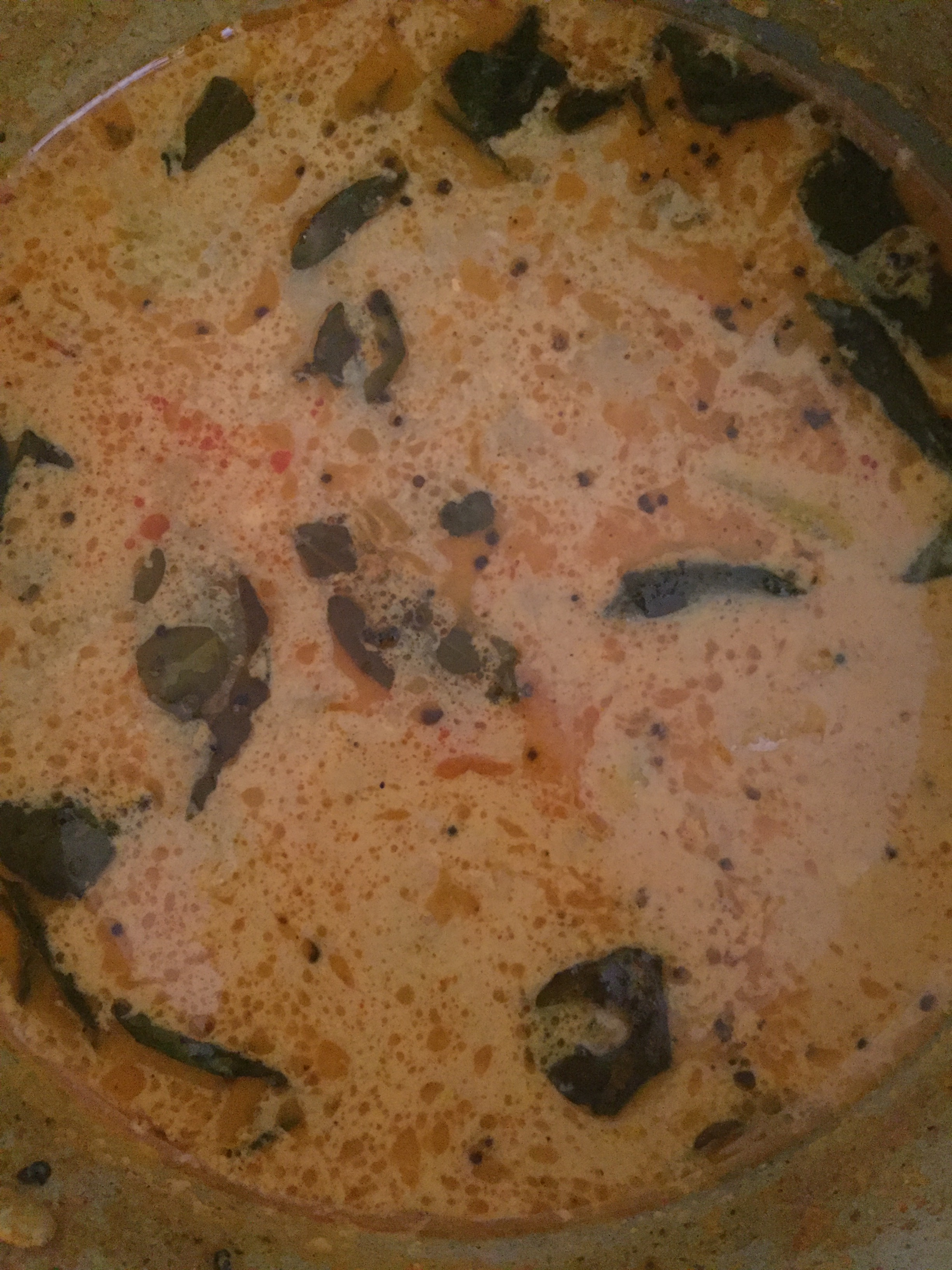

Majjige huli is an Indian dish native to Karnataka prepared with sour curd/ buttermilk curd. It typically includes vegetables in a buttermilk gravy. Majjige huli is a traditional Sankranti food. Majjige huli can be prepared from different vegetables like Sambrani Gadde (Chinese Potato), Mangalore Cucumber, Ivy gourd and others.
