= Kodi gudla pulusu =

Indian dish

- Course: Main
- Place of origin: India
- Region or state: Telangana
- Main ingredients: Boiled eggs, tamarind

Kodi guddu pulusu is a dish in Telangana. Kodi guddu means "the egg" and pulusu implies a spicy tamarind sauce. As a result, this dish usually consists of boiled eggs cooked in a tangy tamarind sauce combined with spices.
