= M Kamalathal =

Indian social worker

- Born: 1934 or 1935 (age 91–92); Vadivelampalayam, Tamilnadu, India
- Other names: Idli Amma (mother); Paatima (grandmother)
- Known for: Makes & sells Idlis to migrant workers and needy for INR 1

M Kamalathal, affectionately known as the Idli Amma (mother) and Paatima (grandmother), is an Indian social worker known particularly for her work in making & selling Idlis to migrant workers and needy for INR 1.

== Social works ==
Kamalathal, an octogenarian and a resident of Vadivelampalayam on the Coimbatore city outskirts, is known for her selfless service-cum-low margin business model. She sells around 600 Idlis every day for INR 1 a piece with sambar and chutney side dishes, all of which she prepares alone.
