= Upma =

Semolina or rice dish from India

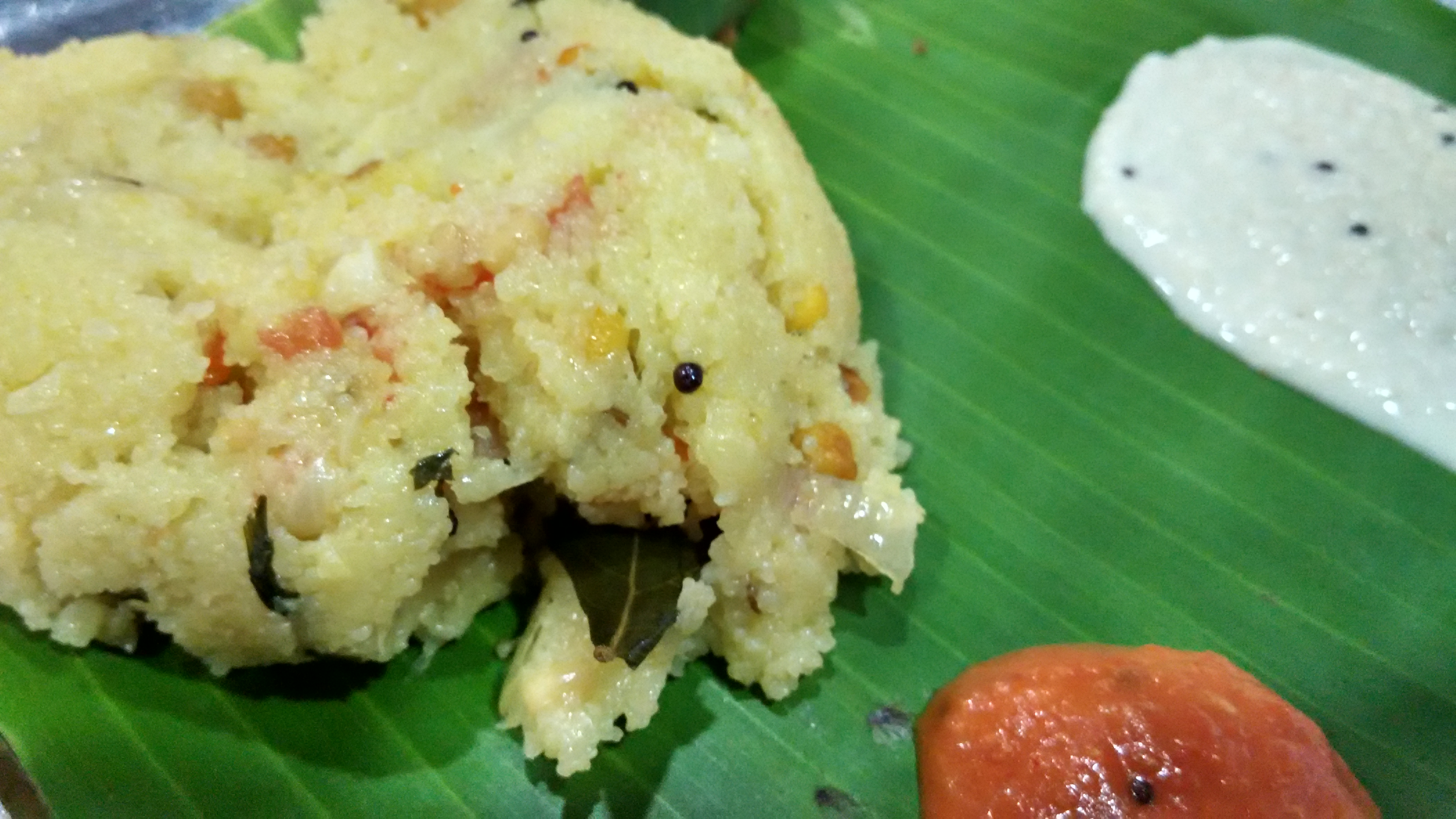
- Upma
- Alternative names: Uppuma, uppittu, uppumavu, uppindi, kharabath, upeet, rulanv
- Course: Breakfast
- Place of origin: India
- Main ingredients: Semolina or coarse rice flour

Upma, uppumavu, uppindi, kharabath, upit, upeet, rulanv, uppuma, or uppittu is a dish of thick porridge from dry-roasted semolina or coarse rice flour. Upma originated from Southern India, and is most common in Andhra Pradesh, Karnataka, Kerala, Maharashtra, Odisha, Tamil Nadu and Telangana. Various seasonings and vegetables may be added during cooking.

Like many South Indian dishes, upma has also become part of Sri Lankan culinary habits (particularly those of Sri Lankan Tamils) since the late 20th century, through Indian influence.

== Etymology ==
The different names for the dish derive from the combinations of the word uppu, meaning salt in Dravidian languages and mavu meaning ground grain meal. In Maharashtra, the dish traditionally had the name saanjai in Marathi, among other denominations. In North India, where the dish is of more recent introduction, it is called upma.

Language	Roman Transliteration	Native Unicode
Kannada	Uppittu, kharabath	ಉಪ್ಪಿಟ್ಟು, ಖಾರಬಾತ್
Tamil	Uppuma	உப்புமா
Malayalam	Uppumavu	ഉപ്പുമാവ്
Telugu	Upma, Uppindi	ఉప్మా, ఉప్పిండి
Marathi	Saanja, upma, upit	सांजा, उपमा, उपीट
Konkani	Rulaanv	रुलांव
Hindi	Upma	उपमा
Odia	Upma	ଉପମା
Bengali	Upma	উপমা

Upma
Nutritional value per 120 gm
- Energy: 1,046 kJ (250 kcal)
- Carbohydrates: 45.67
- Sugars: 2.63
- Dietary fiber: 3.2 g
- Fat: 3.78
- Saturated: 0.916 g
- Monounsaturated: 1.54 g
- Polyunsaturated: 0.944 g
- Protein: 8.11
Vitamins and minerals
Minerals	Quantity %DV^{†}
Potassium	7% 223 mg
Sodium	8% 190 mg
- Link to Fatsecret India
- ^{†}Percentages estimated using US recommendations for adults, except for potassium, which is estimated based on expert recommendation from the National Academies.

== Ingredients and preparation ==
Upma is typically made by first lightly dry roasting semolina (called rava or sooji in India). The semolina is then taken off the fire and kept aside while spices, lentils, onion, ginger, etc. are sautéed in oil or ghee. The semolina is then added back to the pan and mixed thoroughly. Boiling water is added, and the mixture is stirred until the semolina absorbs the liquid and becomes fluffy in texture.

There are several ways in which upma is made, and the variations are obtained by either adding or removing spices and vegetables. The texture can vary significantly as well, depending on how much water is added to it, and how long the mixture is allowed to remain on the flame thereafter.

== Major variations ==
=== Semolina upma ===
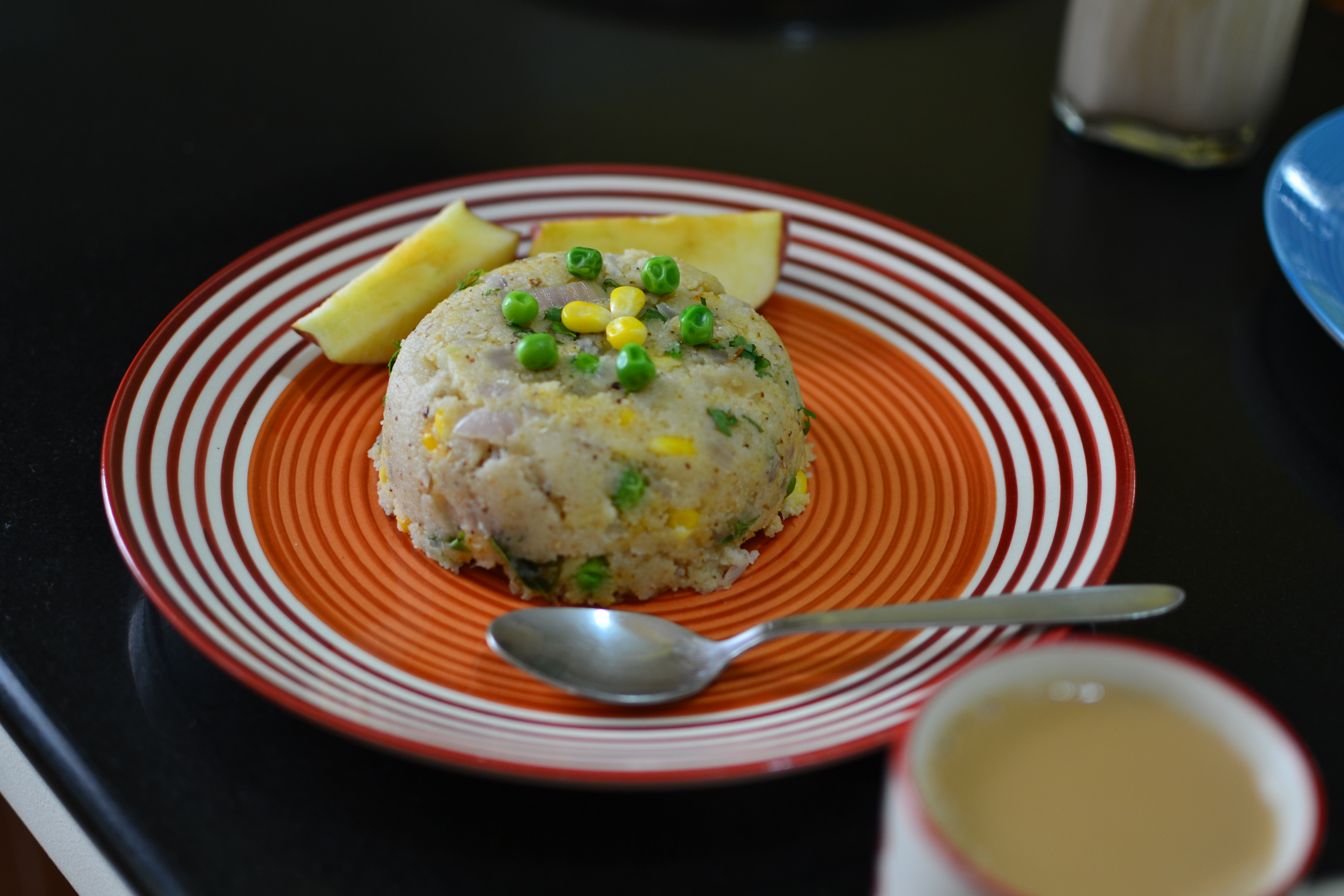
Upma made from sooji

The most popular version with wide variations of upma is made with whole or refined ground semolina made out of durum wheat. Sometimes a wide range of vegetables may be added, and may be garnished with a variety of beans (raw or sprouted), cashews and peanuts. For a variation called masala upma (known as kharabath in Karnataka), sambar masala or garam masala is added along with red chilli powder, instead of green chillies. This variety is more popular in Karnataka, Maharastra, Tamil Nadu and parts of Andhra Pradesh and is usually served in South Indian restaurants. Uppumavu paired with hand-mashed banana is a common breakfast item in Kerala homes.

=== Whole wheat upma ===
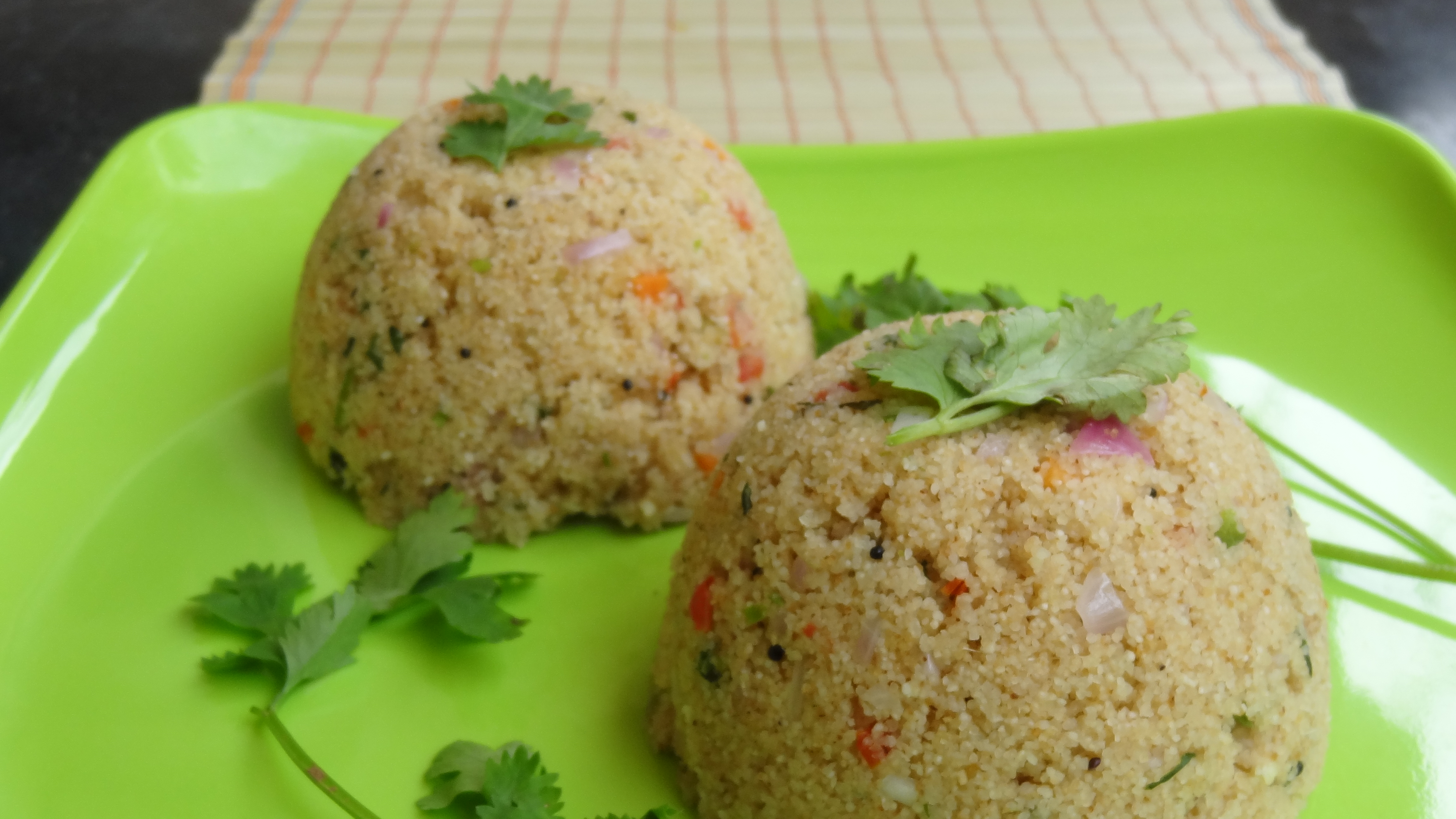
Wheat upma

Whole wheat or wheat dalia (cracked wheat or bulgur) is a common variation of upma in Tamil Nadu, where it is eaten for breakfast or dinner. Sometimes it is cooked with vegetables like peas, carrots, and beans.

=== Upma pesarattu ===
Upma pesarattu is the most popular version in Andhra Pradesh, Yanam and Telangana. The dish contains upma and pesarattu combined. The upma is eaten by wrapping it in the pesarattu.

=== Rice upma ===
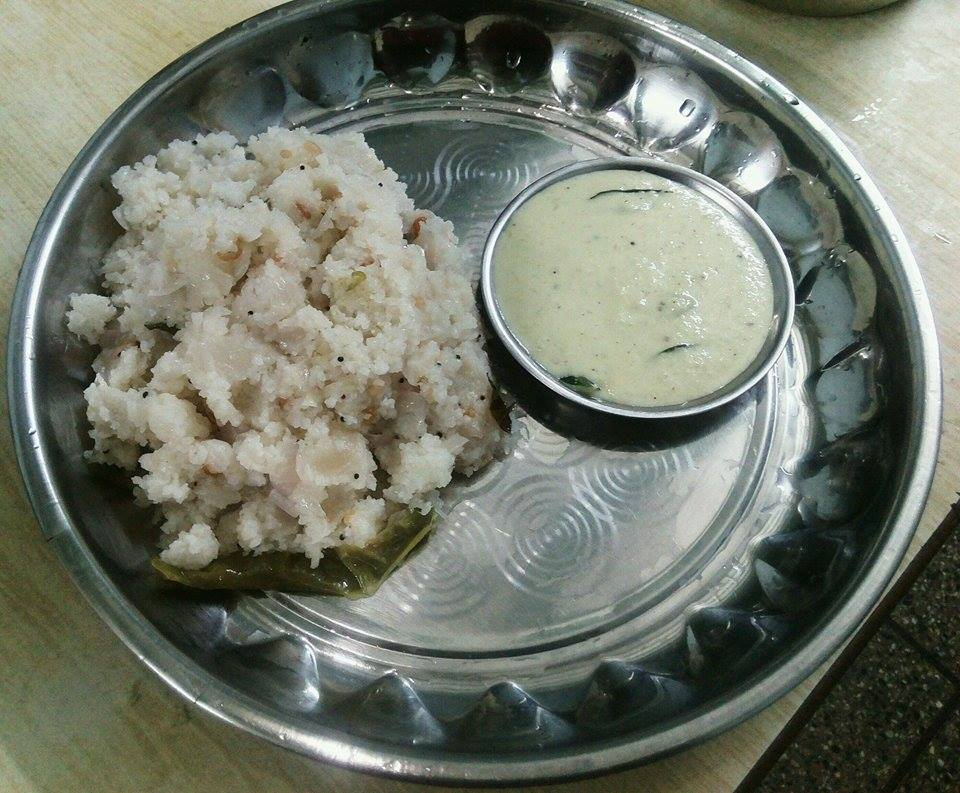
Broken rice upma with coconut chutney

Rice upma, which is mainly popular in Tamil Nadu and southern parts of Karnataka, is referred to as akki tari uppittu (rice coarse flour uppittu). Another variant of upma is prepared with grated coconut instead of onions, especially on holy days, when onion is avoided. This type of upma is generally smeared with ghee at the end of preparation. Dishes similar to upma can be made by substituting small crumbs of leftover bread or idli instead of flour. Upma made from coarser rava known as sajjige is a dish of Udupi cuisine. It is sometimes served along with snacks such as sautéed and spiced poha or chevdo.

=== Corn upma ===
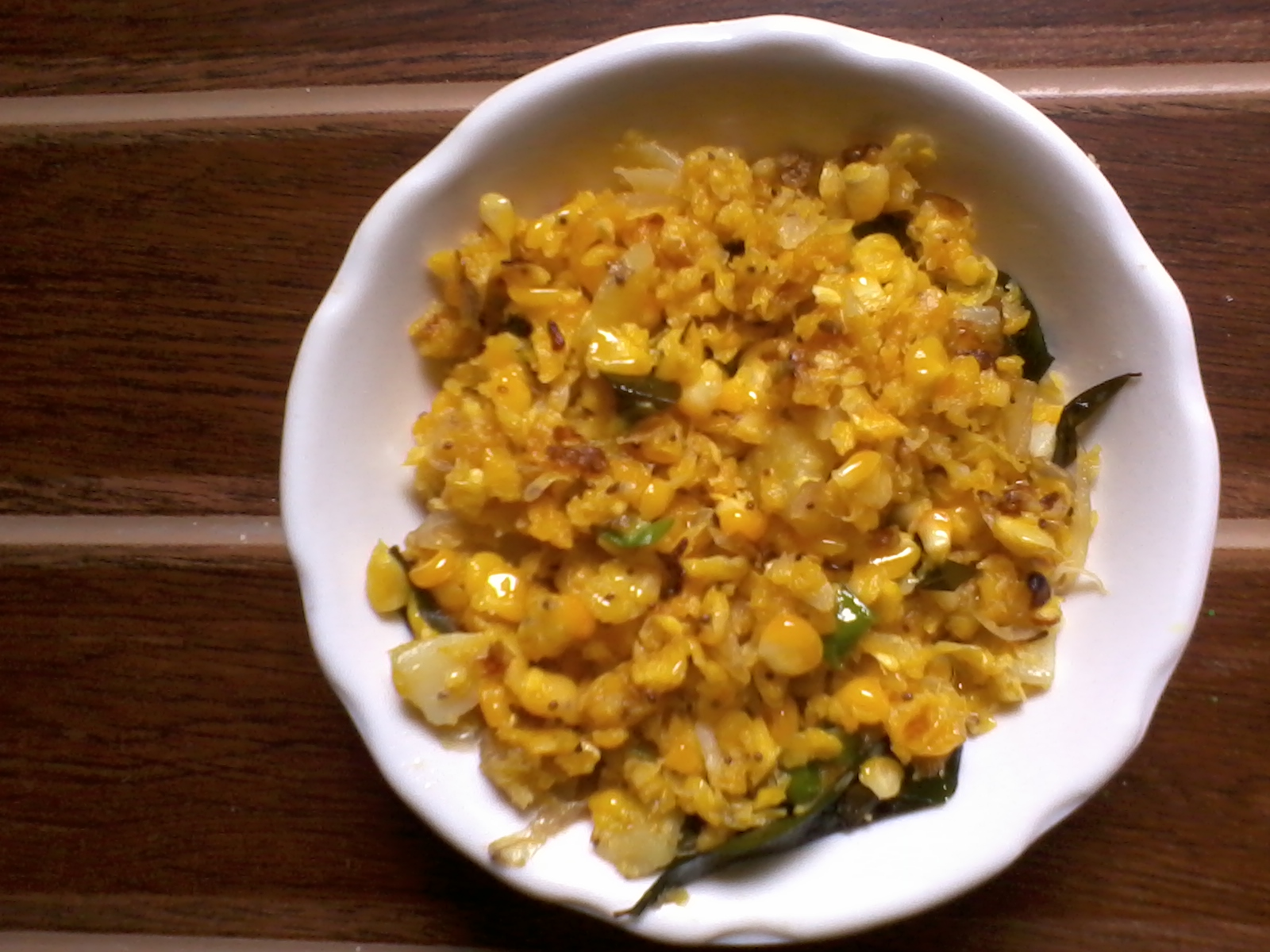
Corn upma

Another variation, particularly as a breakfast dish, is corn upma, eaten with milk and nuts.

=== Kesari bhath ===
In Karnataka, uppittu is also served with another common sweet dish of Karnataka, kesari bhath (ಕೇಸರಿ ಬಾತ್), with a scoop of each on one plate, in a presentation commonly called "chow chow bath".

=== Aval upma/Atukula upma ===
In Kerala and Andhra Pradesh, upma is made with flattened rice as a substitute for semolina. This dish is popularly called as Aval upmavu in Malayalam (അവൽ ഉപ്പുമാവ്) and Atukulu upma (అటుకులు ఉప్మా) in Telugu. This variant is also known as aval upma in the Chennai region when made with rice flakes similar to poha.

=== Vermicelli upma ===
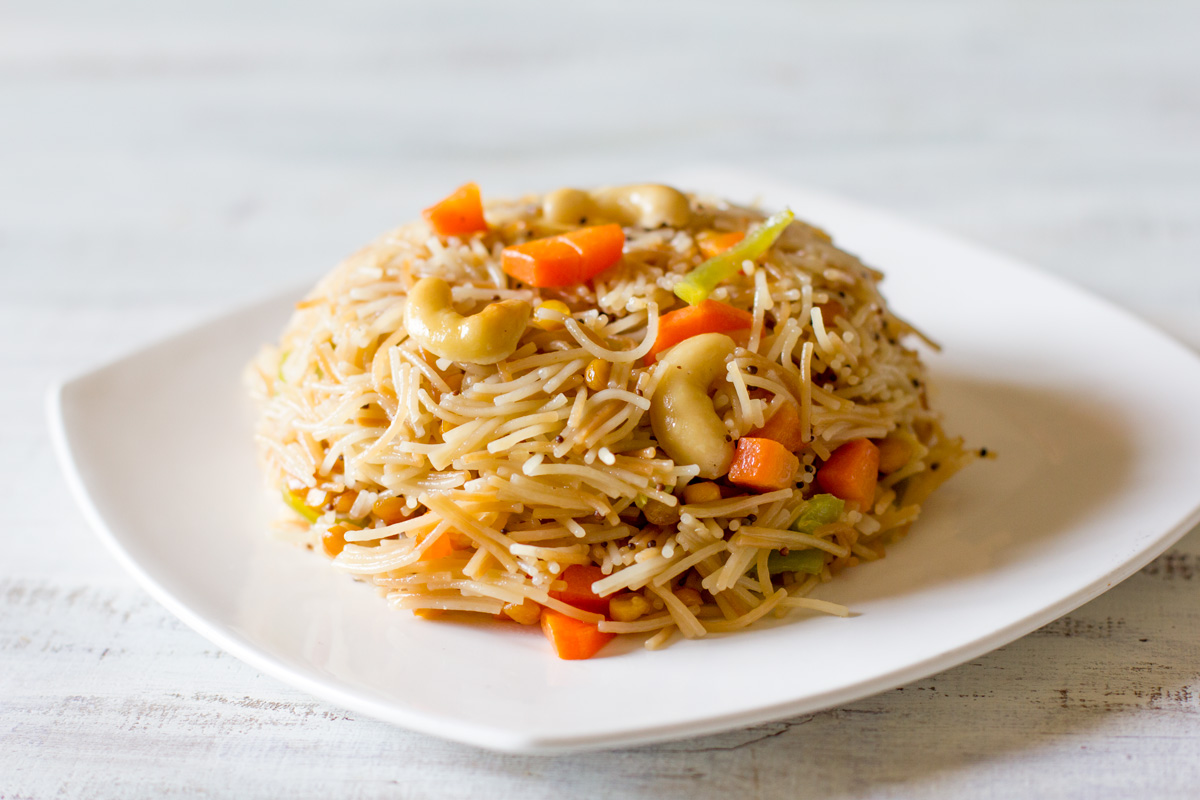
Vermicelli upma

A popular light evening snack is upma made with vermicelli and tomato, peas and carrot.

=== Upma with ghugni ===
In most parts of Odisha, a popular breakfast consists of sooji upma served with ghugni.

== See also ==
- List of porridges
- Broken rice
- Couscous
