= Rava idli =

South Indian breakfast item

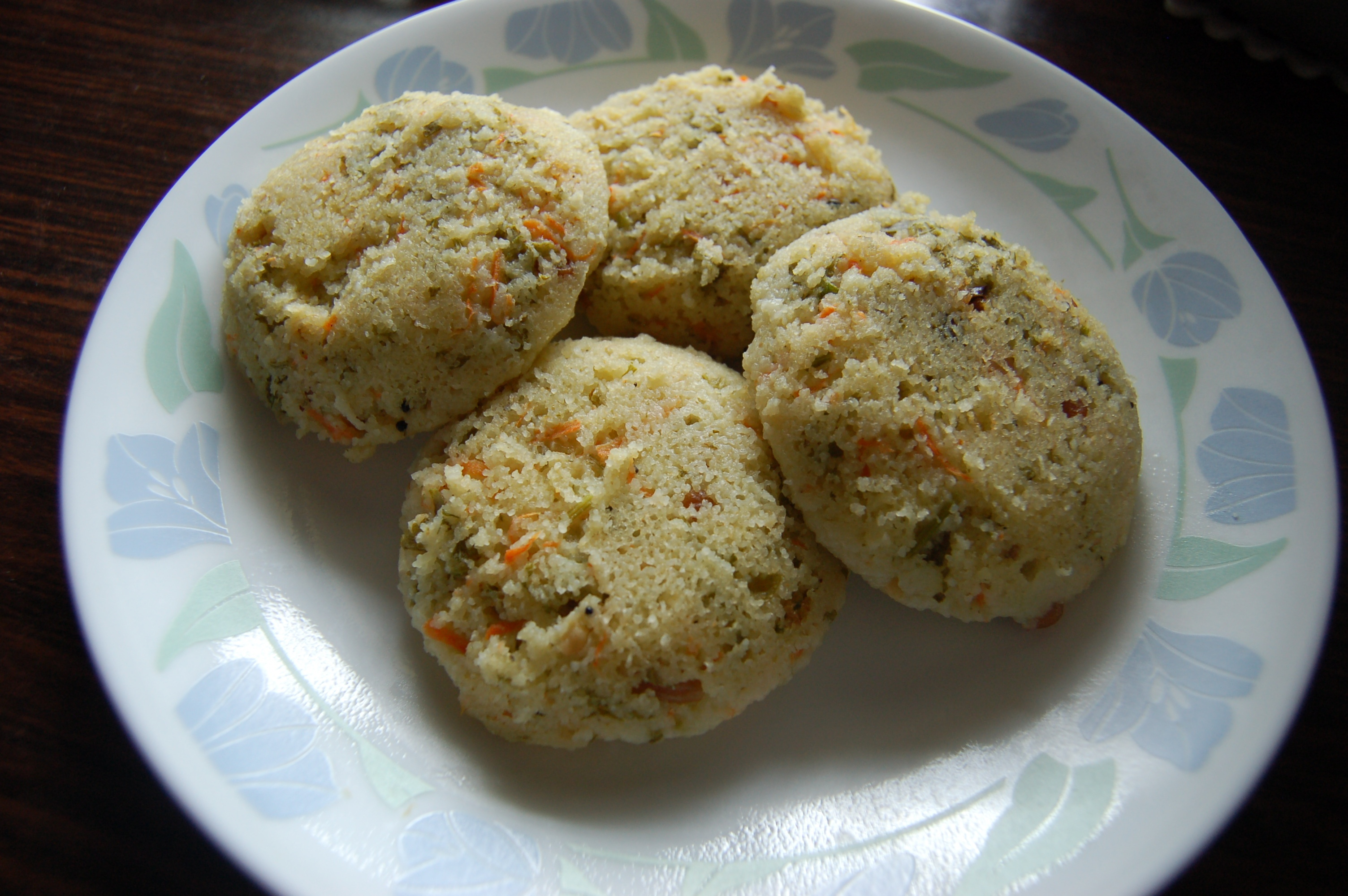
- Rava idli
- Course: Breakfast, snack
- Place of origin: India
- Region or state: Karnataka
- Main ingredients: Semolina, yogurt, chopped cilantro, curry leaves, ghee, crushed ginger, mustard seeds, cashew nuts, green chilies, baking soda
- Variations: Idli (coarsely ground rice)

Rava idli (also rave idli) is a variation of the popular South Indian breakfast item idli, made with rava (coarse ground wheat or rice), Bombay rava, semolina or rice rava.

== History ==
It is a speciality of the state of Karnataka in India. It was invented by the popular restaurant chain, Mavalli Tiffin Rooms (MTR) of Bangalore. During World War II, when rice, which is the staple item used in idli, was in short supply, they experimented with making idli using semolina and created rava idli.

Rava idli translates to semolina idli in the Kannada language. It is usually found in restaurants that serve Udupi cuisine. Rava idli is served hot and is to be eaten along with saagu and coconut chutney. A dash of ghee poured on the top of rava idli adds to the overall taste.

== See also ==
- Cuisine of Karnataka
- List of steamed foods
- How To Make Idli With Idli Rava
