= Bombay rava =

Durum wheat product and form of semolina

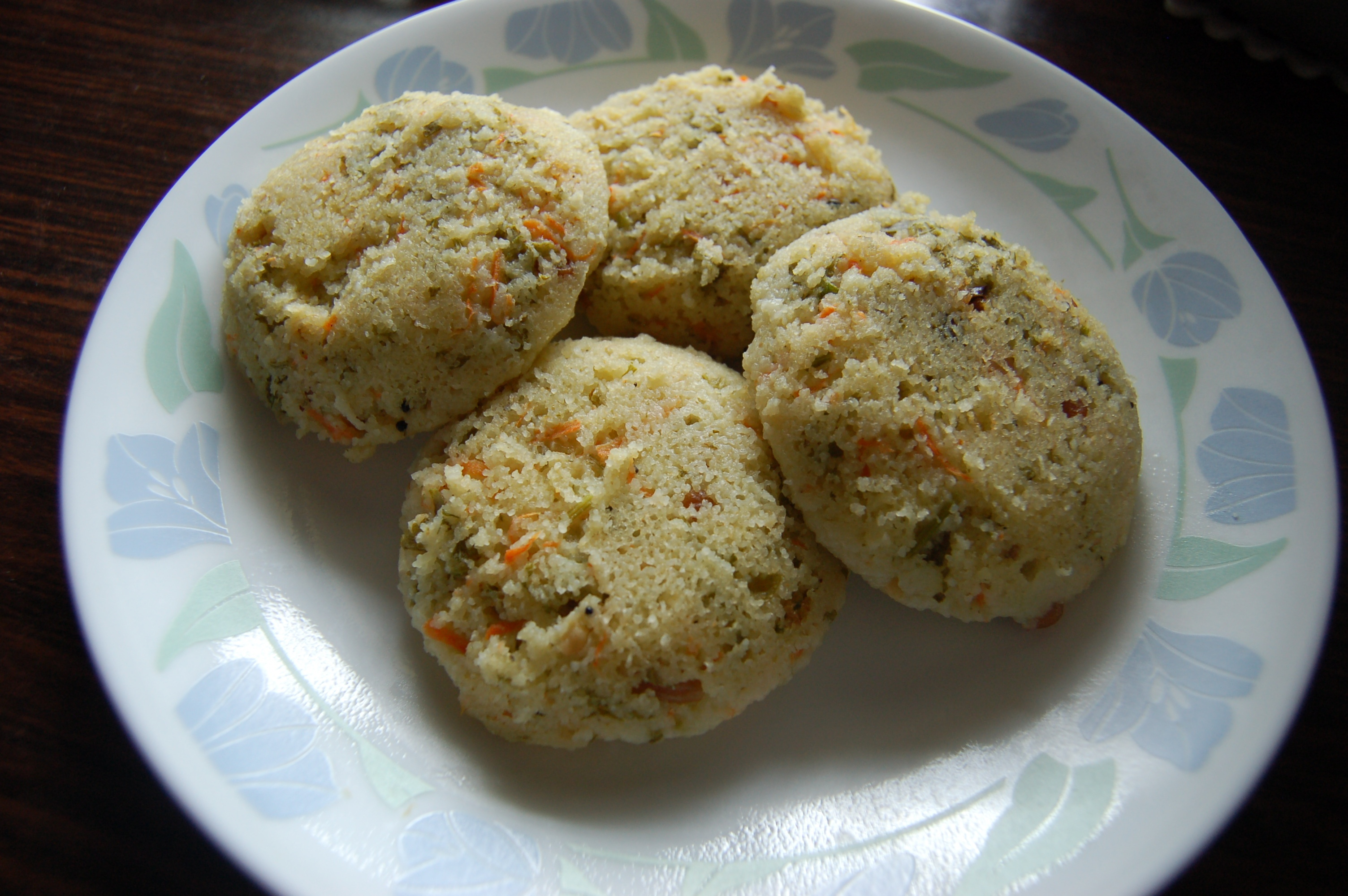
Rava idli (semolina steamed cake), a South Indian dish or breakfast, made with Bombay rava

Bombay rava, or ravva, rawa, or sooji, is a durum wheat product and a form of semolina. It is also known as nookalu in Telugu.

Rava is made by grinding husked wheat, and is used in Indian cuisine to make savoury dishes such as rava dosa, rava idli, upma, and khichdi. It is also used to make sweet dishes, such as rava ladoo, and sooji halwa in North Indian cuisine (which is also known as rava kesari or kesari bath in South Indian cuisine).

Another type of semolina (rava) known as chamba rava, a byproduct obtained while milling wheat flour. In contrast, Bombay rava is a byproduct obtained while milling refined maida, making it finer.

== Process ==
Rava may be described as the residue of milled material after the flour is ground in a flour mill (chakki). It is passed through a fine mesh until flour and rava are separated.

== Usage ==
Bombay rava is used in India to make upma. It is also used as an ingredient in some varieties of dosa, especially the rava dosa.
