= Idli podi =

Spice powder

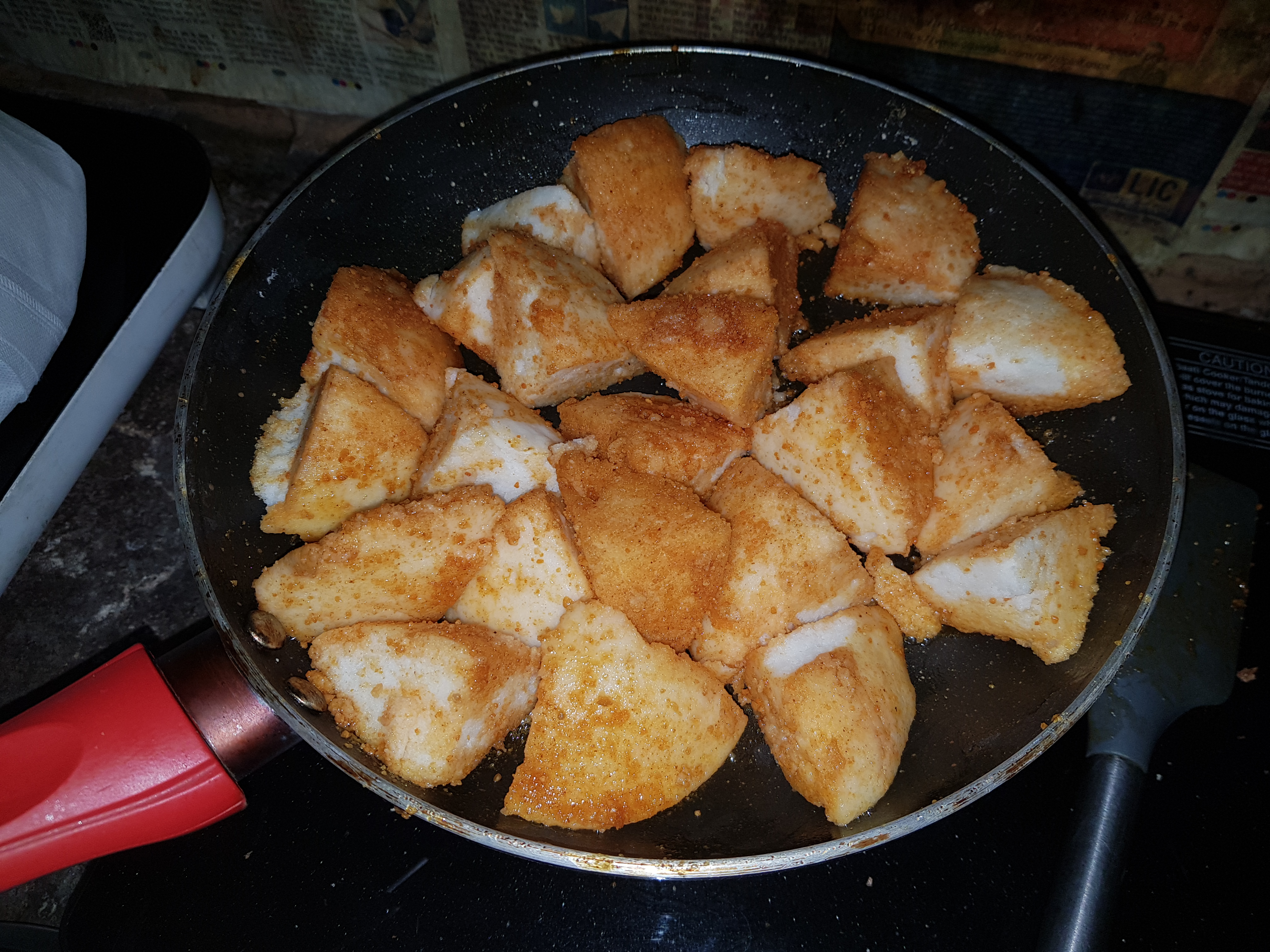
- An idli covered in idli podi
- Region or state: South India

Idli podi, chutney pudi, or milagai podi (Tamil: இட்லிப் பொடி, romanized: iṭlip poṭi; Malayalam: ഇഡ്ഡലി പൊടി, romanized: iḍḍali poṭi;Telugu: కారం పొడి, romanized: kāraṁ poḍi; Kannada: ಚಟ್ನಿ ಪುಡಿ, romanized: chaṭni puḍi) is a coarse spice powder, originating from the Indian subcontinent, with a mixture of ground dry spices that usually comprises "dried chilis, black gram dhal, chickpea, and sesame seeds". The spice mix is commonly referred to in informal speech as "gunpowder" due to its flavorful heat or chutney powder. It is generally mixed with gingelly (sesame) oil or melted ghee when it is served alongside idli or dosa.

While historical records of the origin of podi, or gunpowder, are scattered, Sangam literature boasts it as a popular delicacy during the reign of the Vijayanagara dynasty. Its impact is most prominent in the South Indian states of Andhra Pradesh, Telangana, Karnataka, and Tamil Nadu.

== Preparation ==
The ingredients are dry-roasted separately and then ground together into a coarse powder. Alongside the lentils, chillies, and sesame of the basic mix, many cooks add garlic, curry leaves, asafoetida, and black pepper. Because it uses only dry ingredients, the powder keeps for weeks in an airtight jar, unlike the fresh chutneys it often stands in for.

== See also ==
- List of chutneys
- List of condiments
- List of Indian condiments
