= Idli =

South Indian savoury rice cake

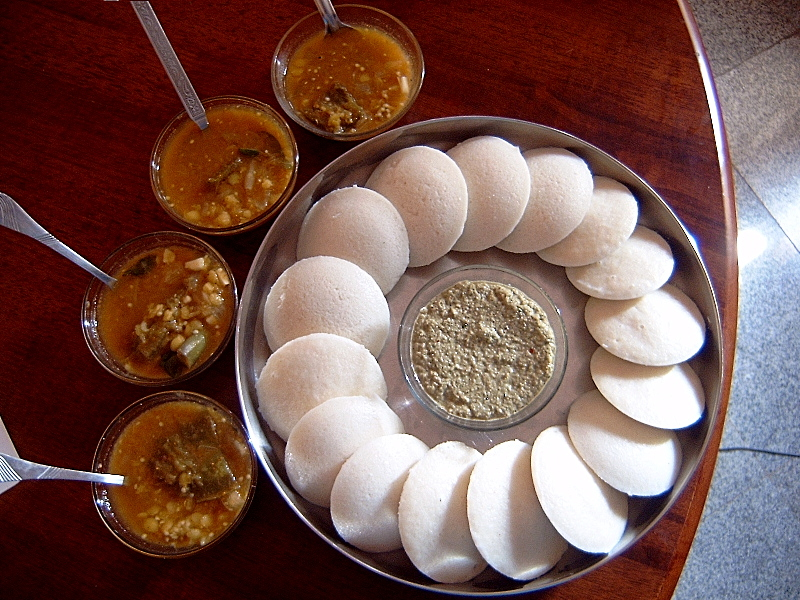
- Idli With Chutney
- Course: Breakfast, dinner
- Region or state: South India
- Associated cuisine: India, Sri Lanka
- Serving temperature: Hot with a condiment such as sambar or chutney
- Main ingredients: Black lentils (de-husked), rice
- Variations: Button idli, tate idli, sanna, sambar idli, rava idli, masala idli, shell idli

Idli (/ˈɪdliː/; plural: idlis) or idly is a South Indian rice cake popular as a breakfast food. The cakes are made by steaming a batter consisting of fermented hulled black lentils and rice. The fermentation process breaks down the starches so that they are more easily digested.

Idli has several variations, including rava idli, which is made from semolina. Regional variants include sanna of Konkan.

== History ==
A precursor of the modern idli is mentioned in several ancient Indian works. Vaddaradhane, a 920 CE Kannada language work by Shivakotiacharya, mentions "iddalige", prepared only from a black gram batter. Chavundaraya II, the author of the earliest available Kannada encyclopedia, Lokopakara (c.1025 CE), describes the preparation of this food by soaking black gram in buttermilk, ground to a fine paste, and mixed with the clear water of curd and spices. The Western Chalukya king and scholar Someshwara III, reigning in the area now called Karnataka, included an idli recipe in his encyclopedia, Manasollasa (1130 CE). This Sanskrit-language work describes the food as iḍḍarikā. In Karnataka, the Idli in 1235 CE is described as being "light, like coins of high value", which is not suggestive of a rice base. The food prepared using this recipe is now called uddina idli in Karnataka.

The recipe mentioned in these ancient Indian works leaves out three key aspects of the modern idli recipe: the use of rice (not just black gram), the long fermentation of the mix, and the steaming for fluffiness. The references to the modern recipe appear in the Indian works only after 1250 CE. Food historian K. T. Achaya speculates that the modern idli recipe might have originated in present-day Indonesia, which has a long tradition of fermented food. According to him, the cooks employed by the Hindu kings of the Indianised kingdoms might have invented the steamed idli there, and brought the recipe back to India during 800–1200 CE. Achaya mentioned an Indonesian dish called "kedli", which according to him, was like an idli. However, Janaki Lenin was unable to find any recipe for an Indonesian dish by this name. According to food historian Colleen Taylor Sen the fermentation process of idli batter is a natural process that was discovered independently in India, since nearly all cultures use fermentation in some form. According to Dorian Fuller, the steaming technique was already in use in Neolithic South India around 2000 BCE.

The Gujarati work Varṇaka Samuccaya (1520 CE) mentions idli as idari, and also mentions its local adaptation, idada (a non-fermented version of dhokla).

The earliest extant Tamil work to mention idli (as itali) is Maccapuranam, dated to the 17th century. In 2015, Chennai-based idli caterer Eniyavan started celebrating March 30 as "World Idli Day".

== Preparation ==
Idli
Nutritional value per 1 piece (30 gm)
- Energy: 167 kJ (40 kcal)
- Carbohydrates: 7.89 g
- Sugars: 0.22
- Dietary fiber: 1.5 g
- Fat: 0.19 g
- Saturated: 0.037 g
- Monounsaturated: 0.035 g
- Polyunsaturated: 0.043 g
- Protein: 1.91 g
Vitamins and minerals
Minerals	Quantity %DV^{†}
Potassium	2% 63 mg
Sodium	9% 207 mg
- ^{†}Percentages estimated using US recommendations for adults, except for potassium, which is estimated based on expert recommendation from the National Academies.

To make idli, four parts uncooked rice (idli rice or parboiled rice) to one part whole white lentil (black gram, Vigna mungo) are soaked separately for at least four to six hours or overnight. Optionally, spices such as fenugreek seeds can be added at the time of soaking for additional flavour. Once soaked, the lentils are ground to a fine paste, the rice is separately coarsely ground, and they are combined. Next, the mixture is left to ferment overnight during which its volume will more than double. After fermentation, some of the batter may be kept as a starter culture for the next batch. The finished idli batter is put into a perforated greased idli tray for steaming. The perforated molds allow the idlis to be cooked evenly. The tree holds the trays above the level of boiling water in a pot, and the pot is covered until the idlis are done (about 10–25 minutes, depending on size). A more traditional method is to use leaves instead of moulds.

Making idlis

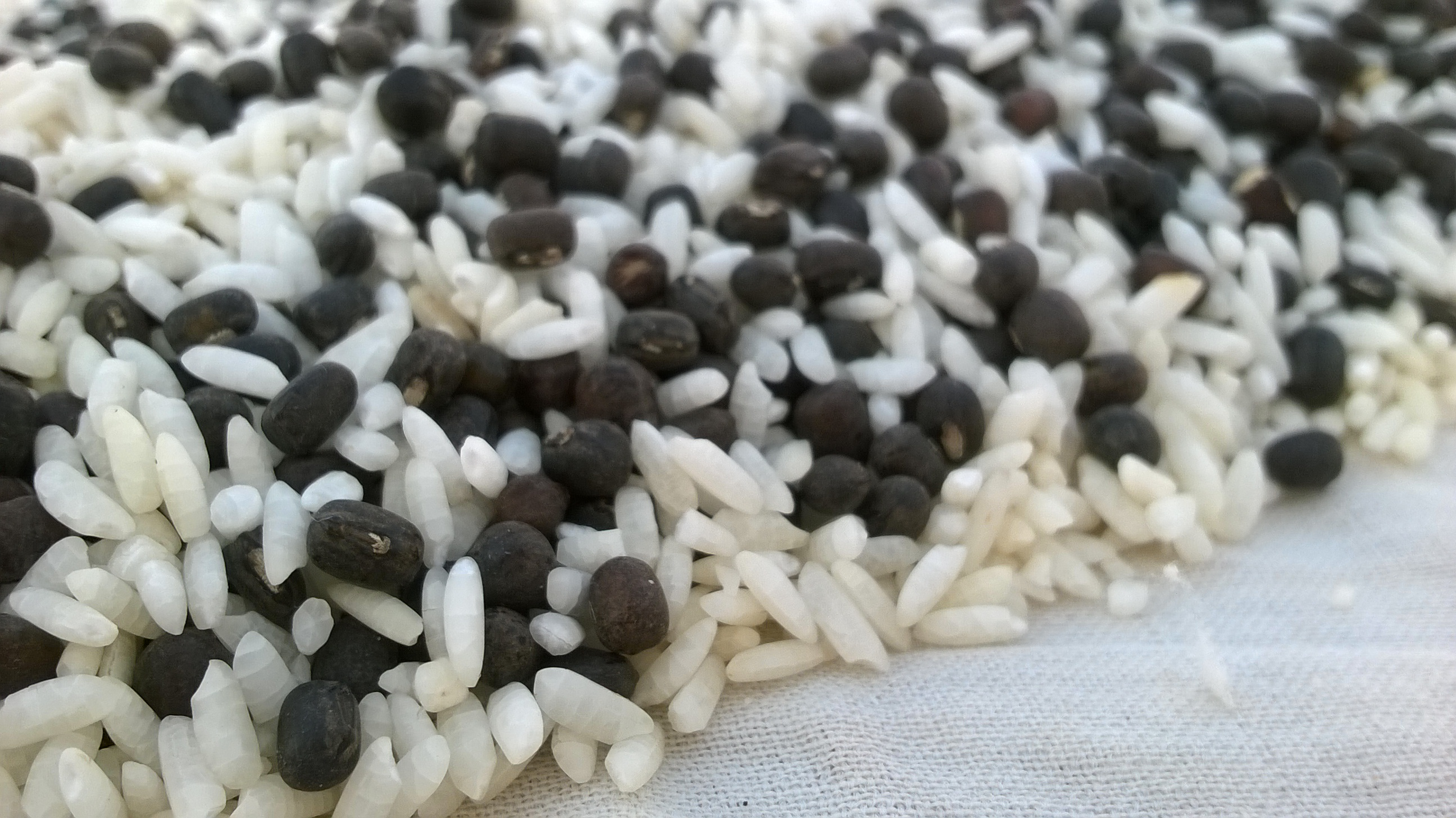
Key ingredients used are rice and black gram.

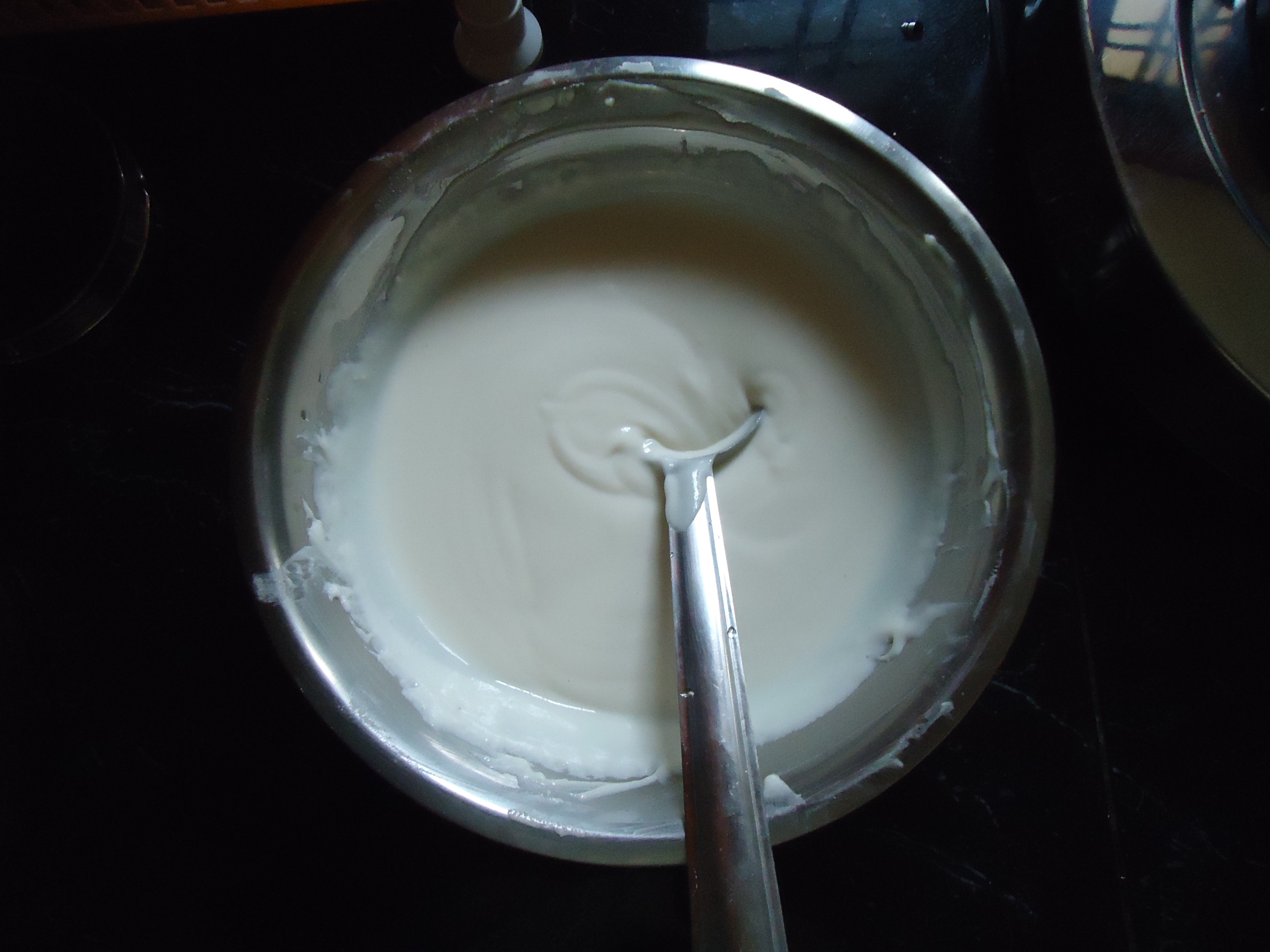
Idli batter

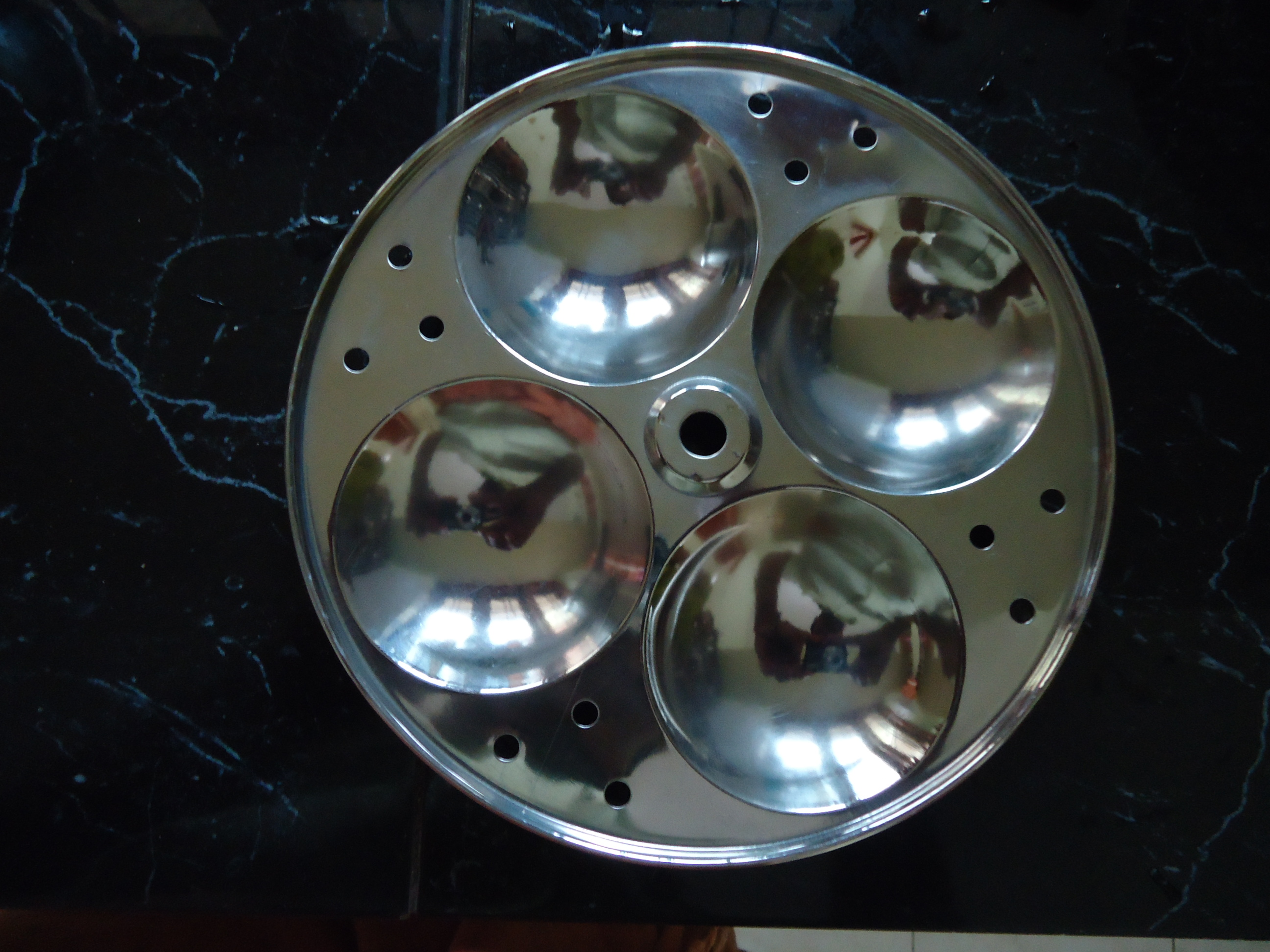
Idli mold

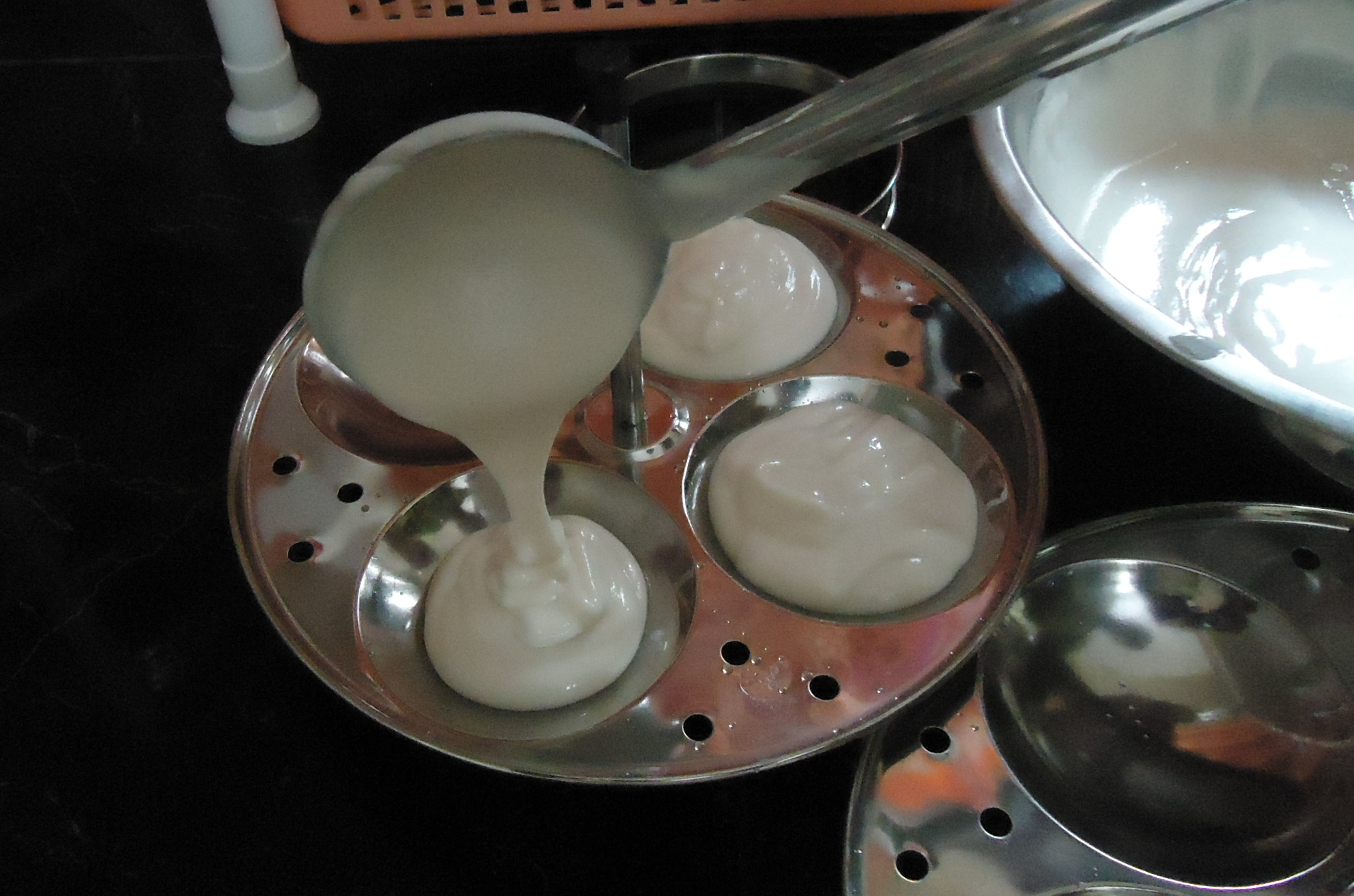
Batter poured into the mold

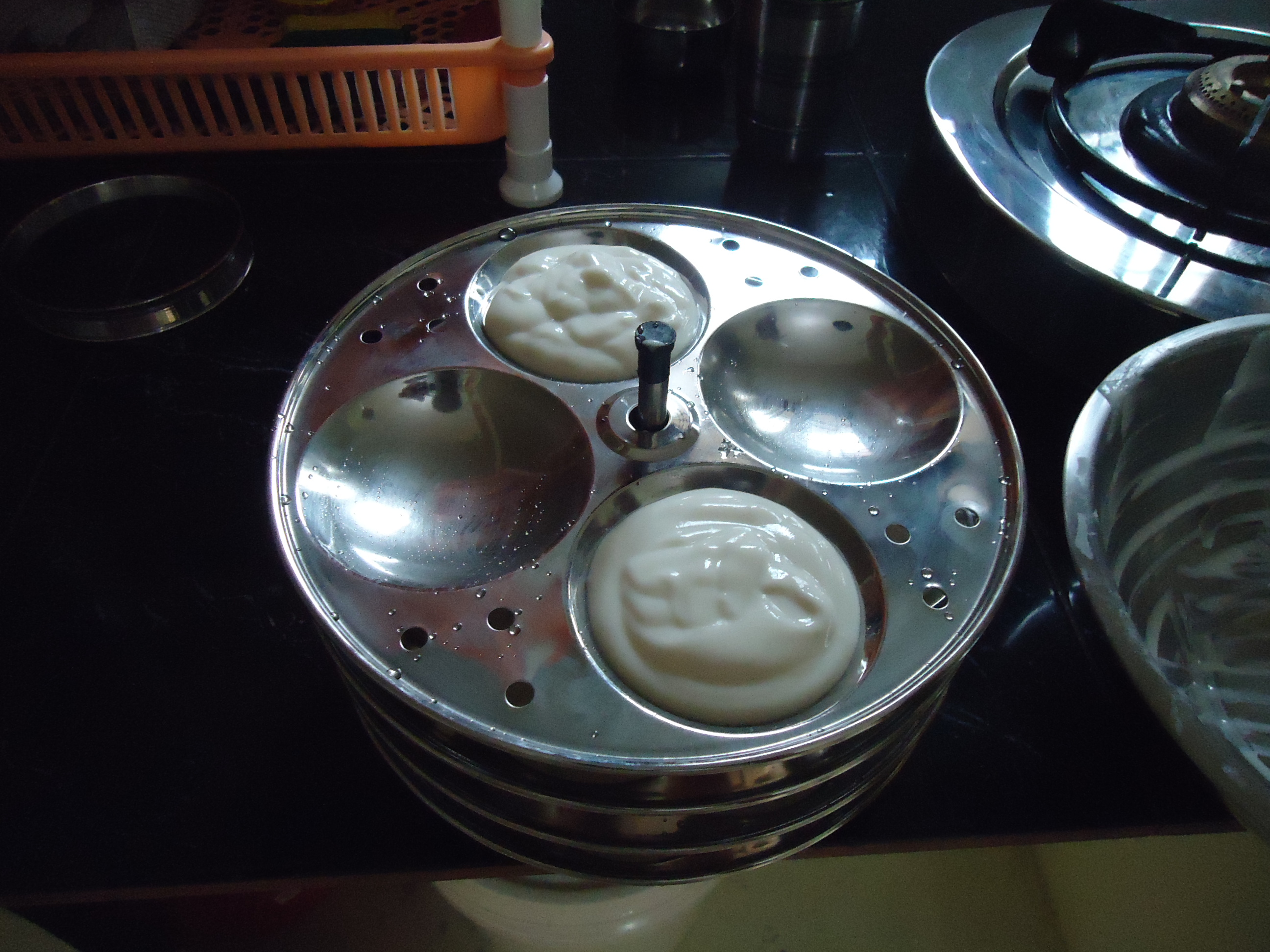
Several molds stacked over another

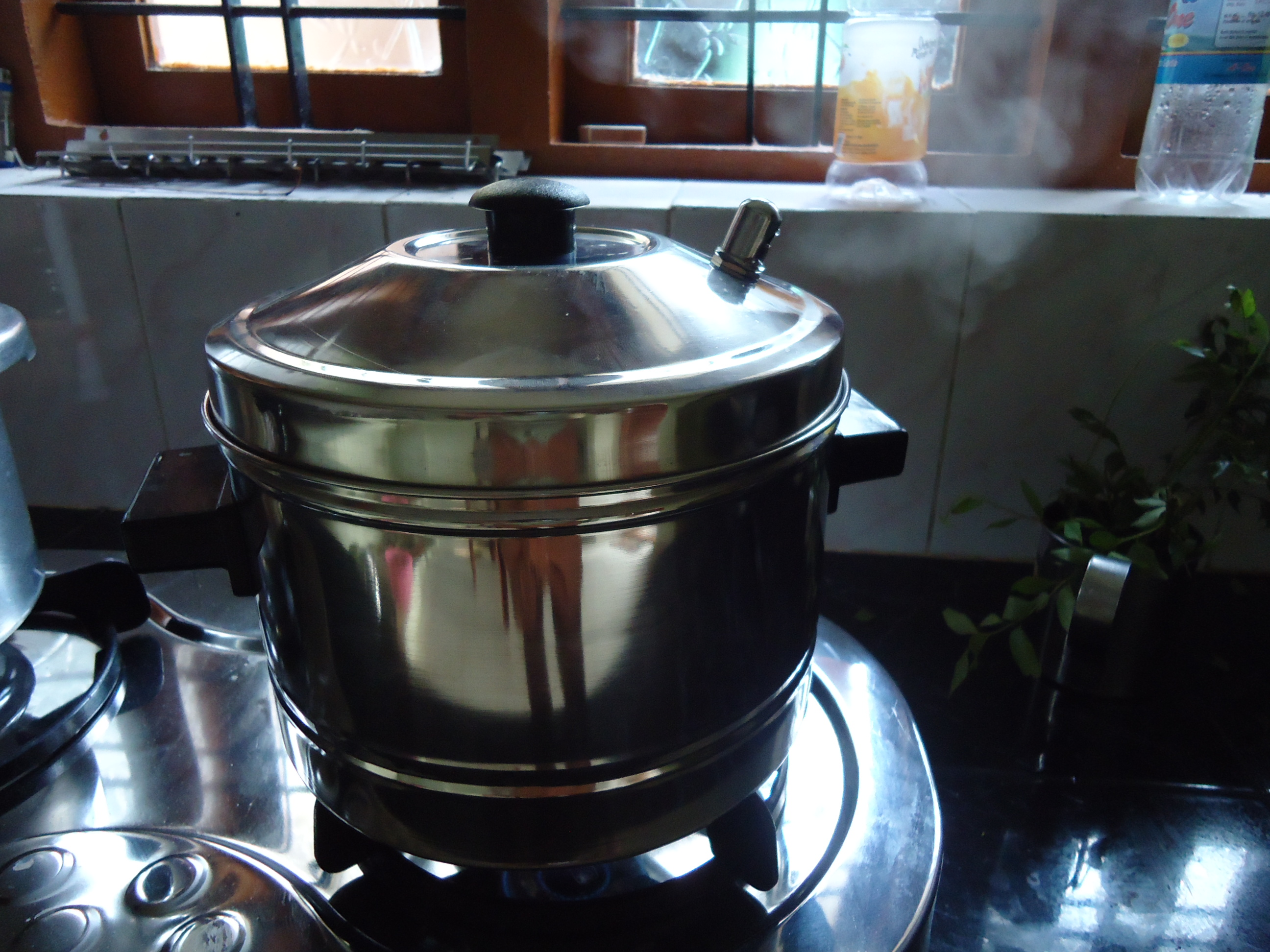
Idli steaming in cooker

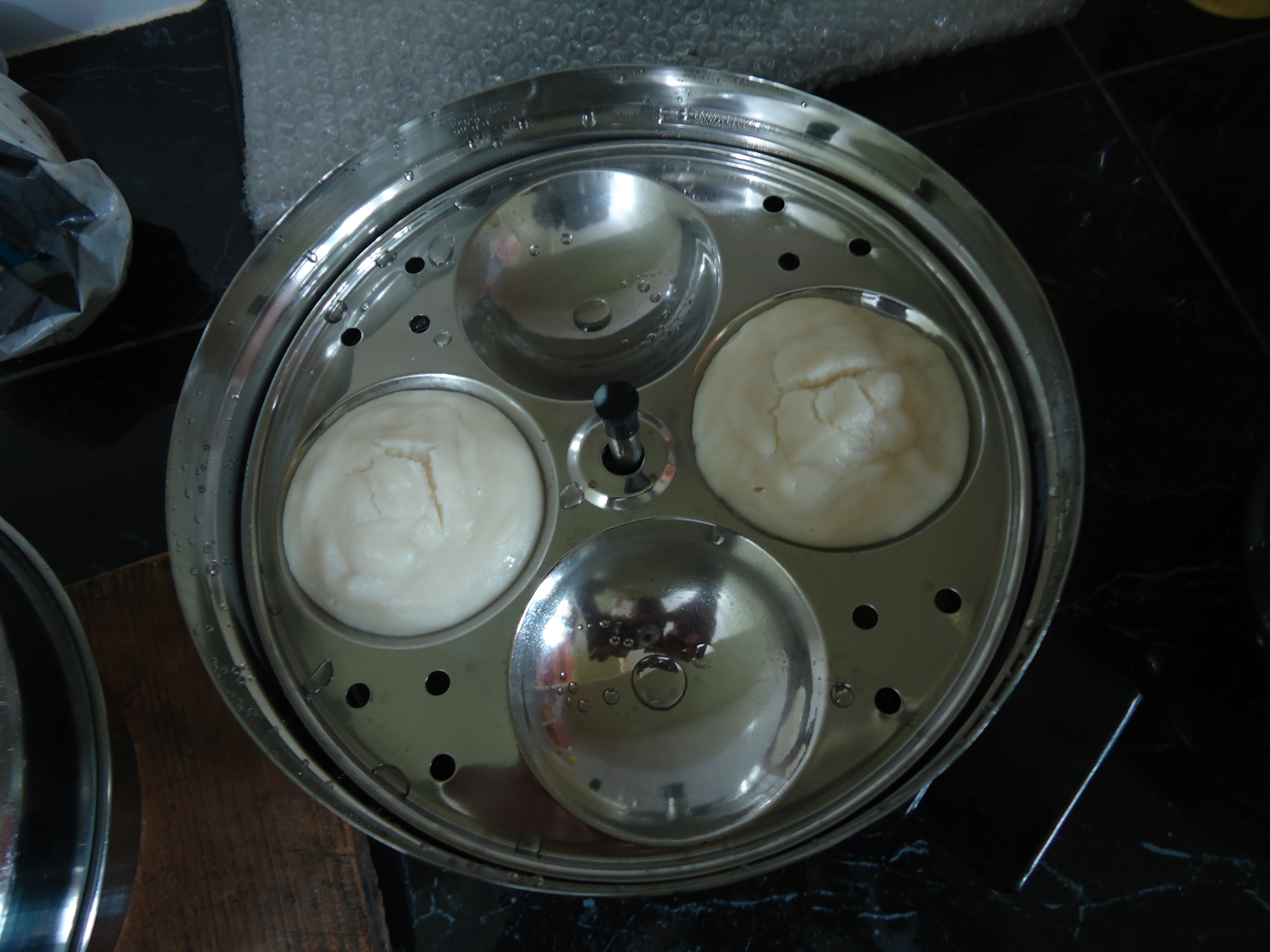
Cooked idli

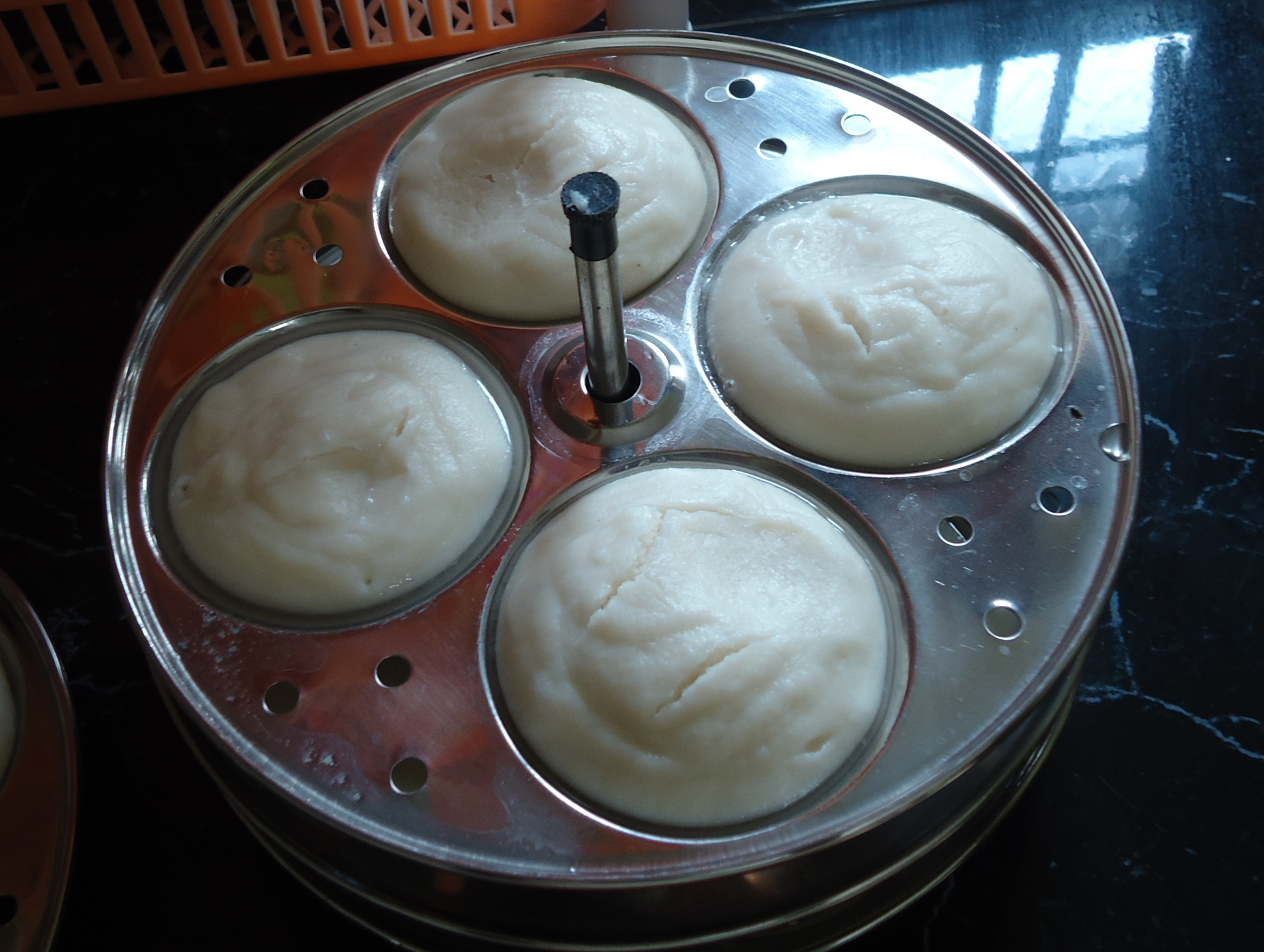
Molds removed from cooker

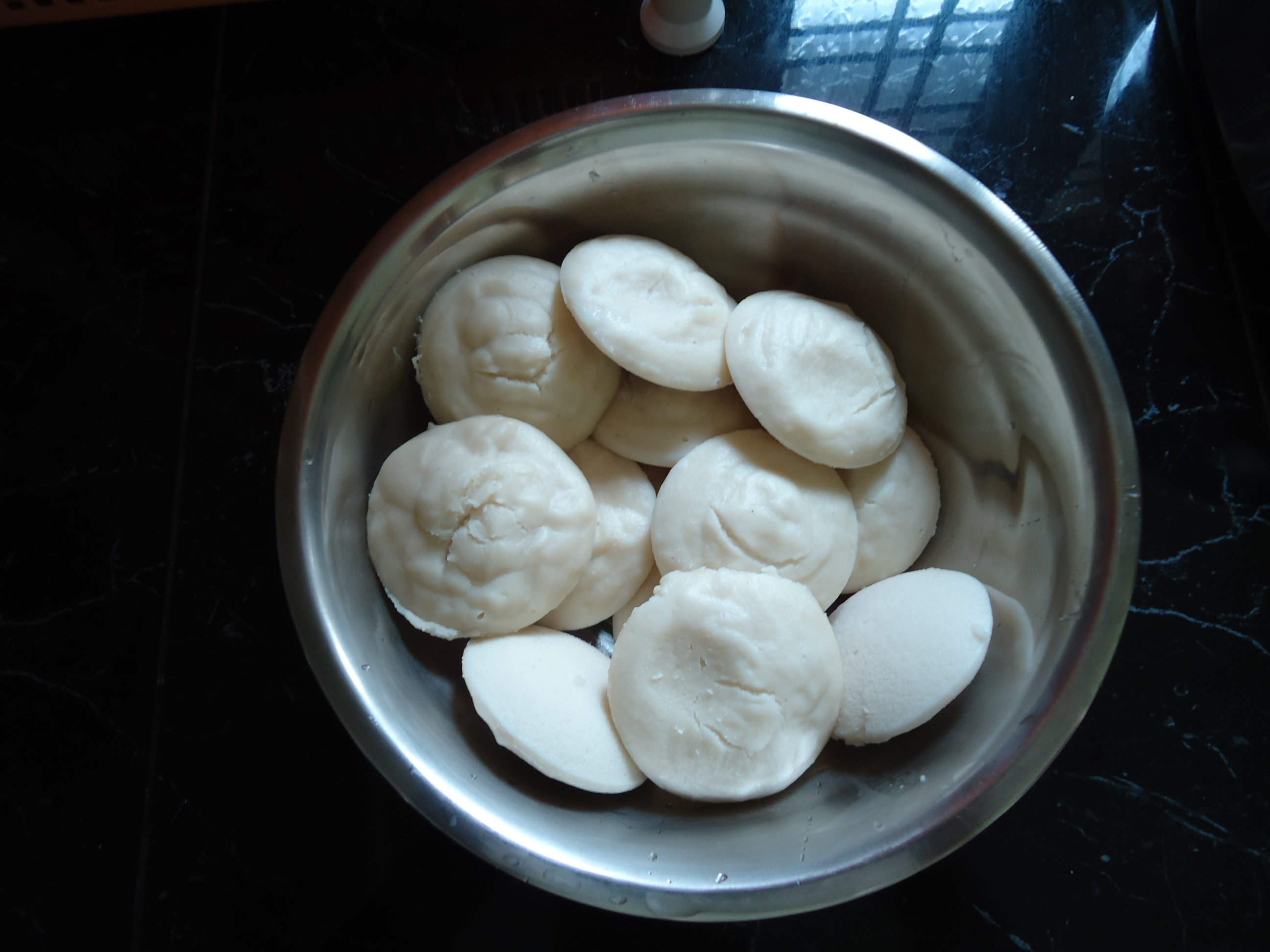
Idlis ready to eat

=== Serving ===
Since plain idlis are mild in taste, a condiment is considered essential. Idlis are often served with chutneys (coconut-based), sambar and medu vada. However, this varies greatly by region and personal taste. It is also often served with kaara chutney (onion-based) or spicy fish curries. The dry spice mixture podi is convenient while travelling.

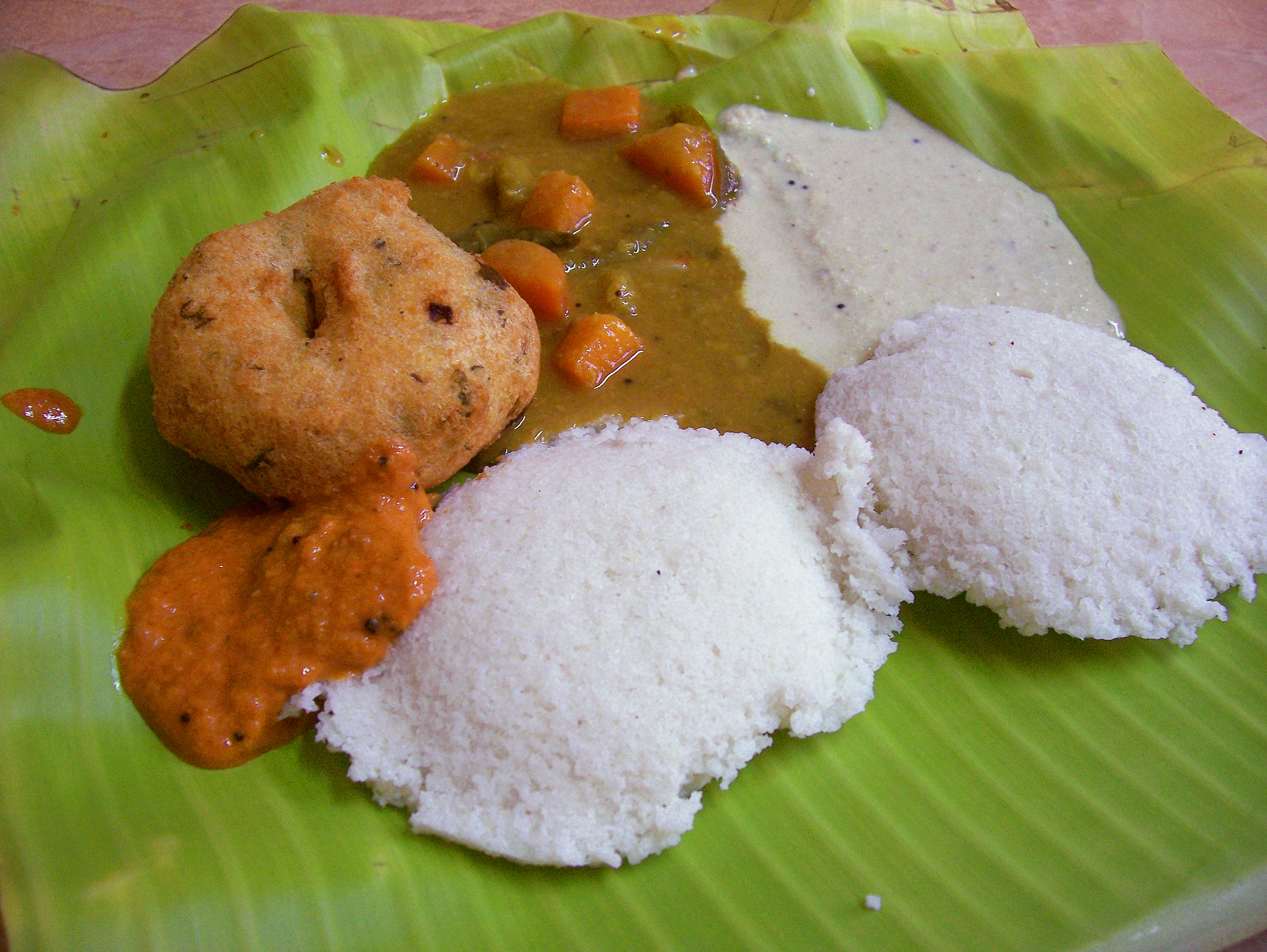
Idli served with coconut chutney, sambar and medu vada on banana leaf.

=== Variations ===
There are several regional variations of idlis made in South India and Sri Lanka. With the emigration of south Indians and Sri Lankans throughout the region and world, many variations on idli have been created in addition to the almost countless local variations. Hard-to-get ingredients and differing cooking customs have required changes in both ingredients and methods. Parboiled rice can reduce the soaking time considerably. Store-bought ground rice or cream of rice may also be used. Similarly, semolina or cream of wheat may be used for preparing rava idli (wheat idli). Dahi (yogurt) may be added to provide the sour flavour for unfermented batters. Pre-packaged mixes allow for almost instant idlis.

In addition to or instead of fenugreek, other spices may be used such as mustard seeds, chili peppers, cumin, coriander, ginger, etc. Sugar may be added to make them sweet instead of savoury. Idli may also be stuffed with a filling of potato, beans, carrot and masala. Leftover idlis can be cut-up or crushed and sautéed for a dish called idli upma. A microwave or an automatic electric steamer that is non-stick is considered to be a convenient alternative to conventional stovetop steamers. Batter preparation using a manual rocking rock grinder can be replaced by electric grinders or blenders. Many restaurants have also come up with fusion recipes of idlis such as idly manchurian, idly fry, chilly idly, stuffed idly, to name a few.

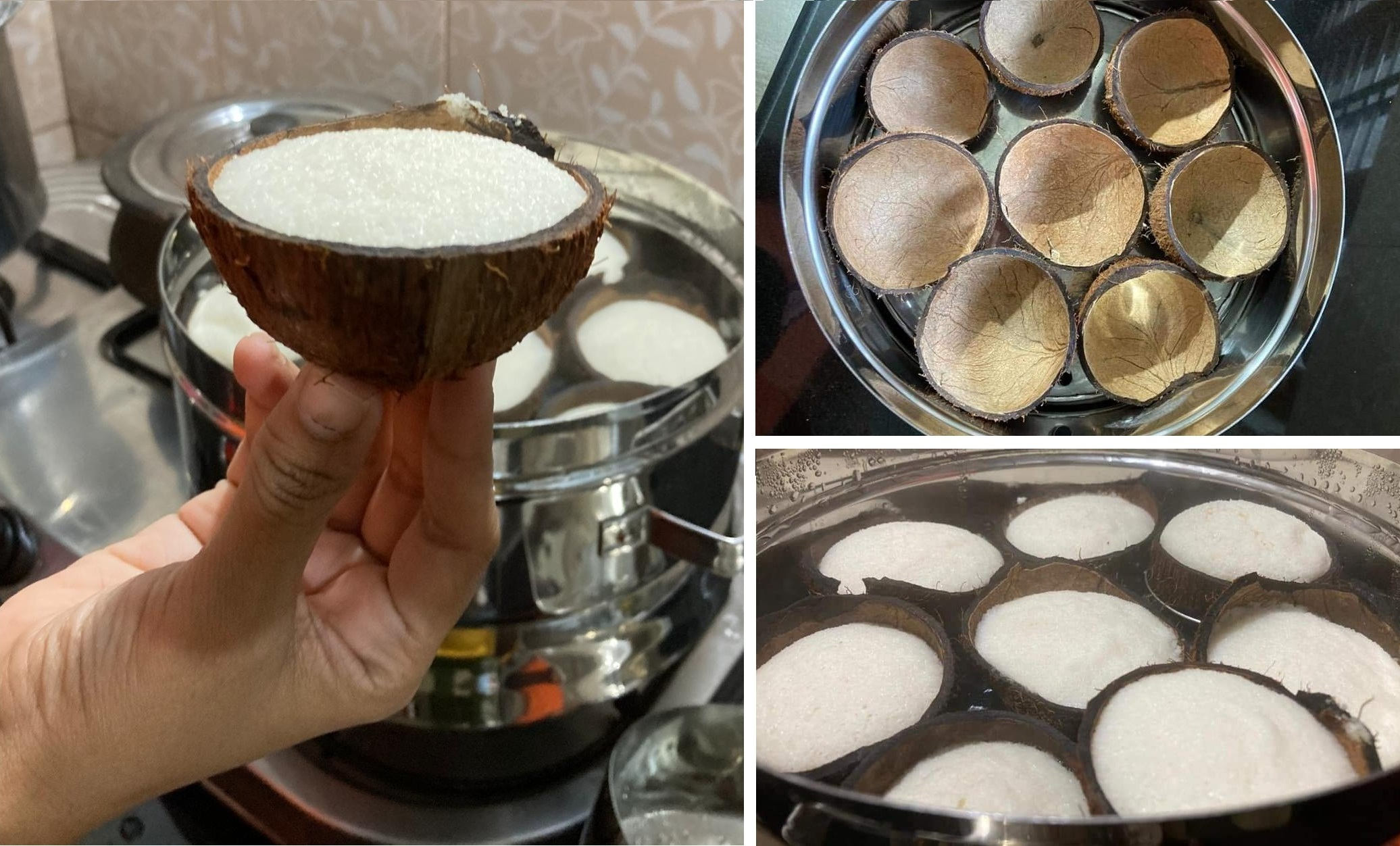
Idlis cooked traditionally in coconut shells, Karnataka

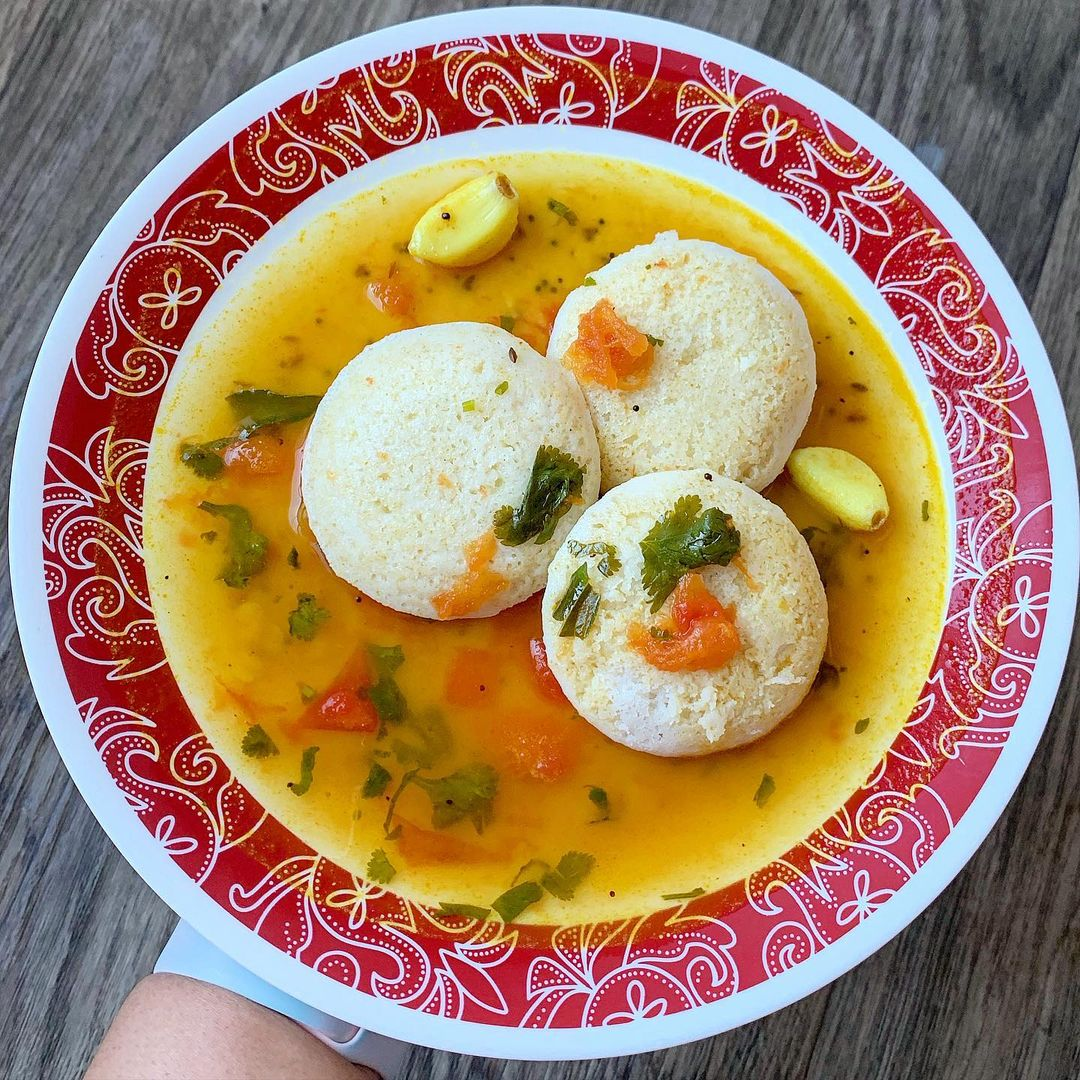
Idli served with rasam

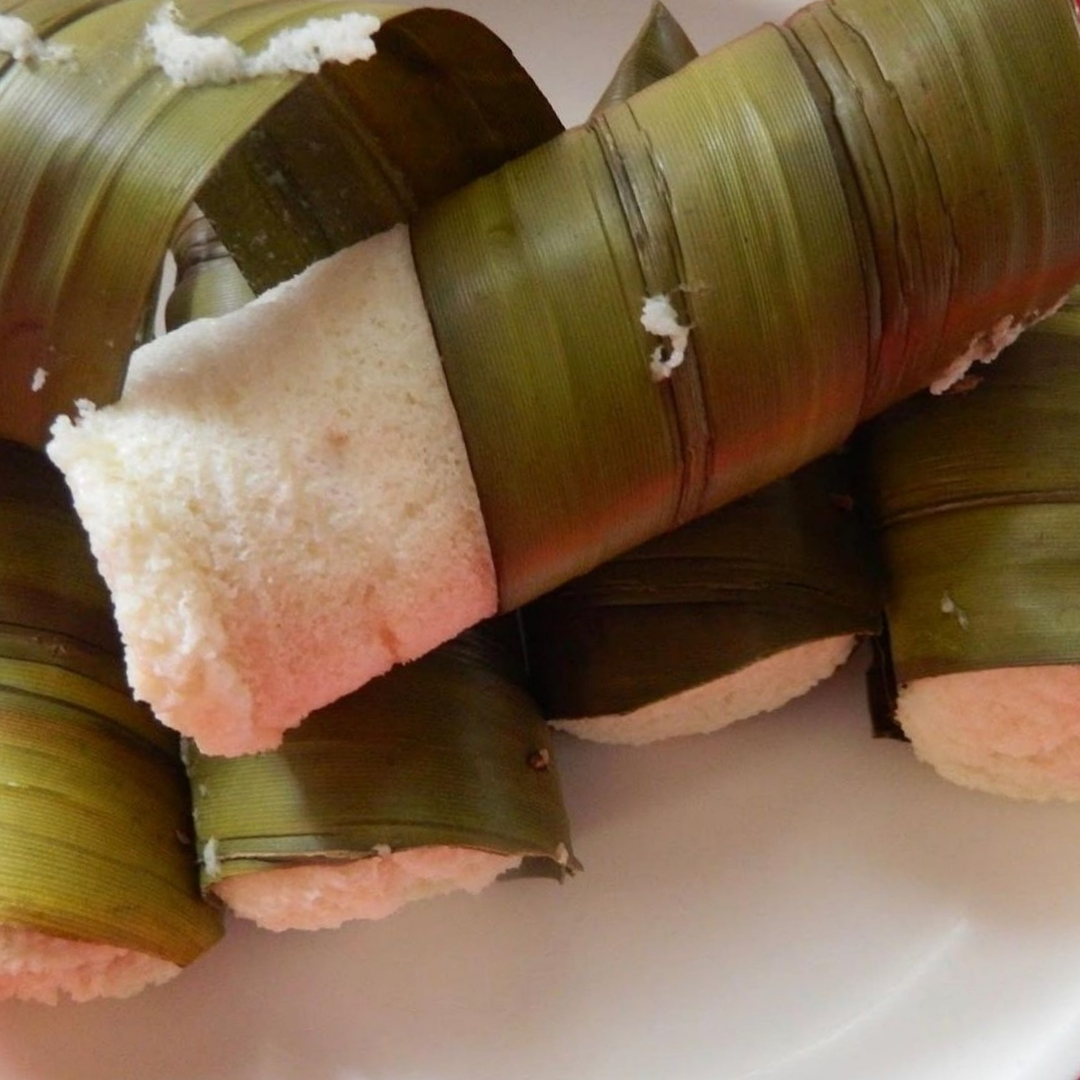
Moode idli steamed in fragrant screwpine leaves, Mangalore, Karnataka.

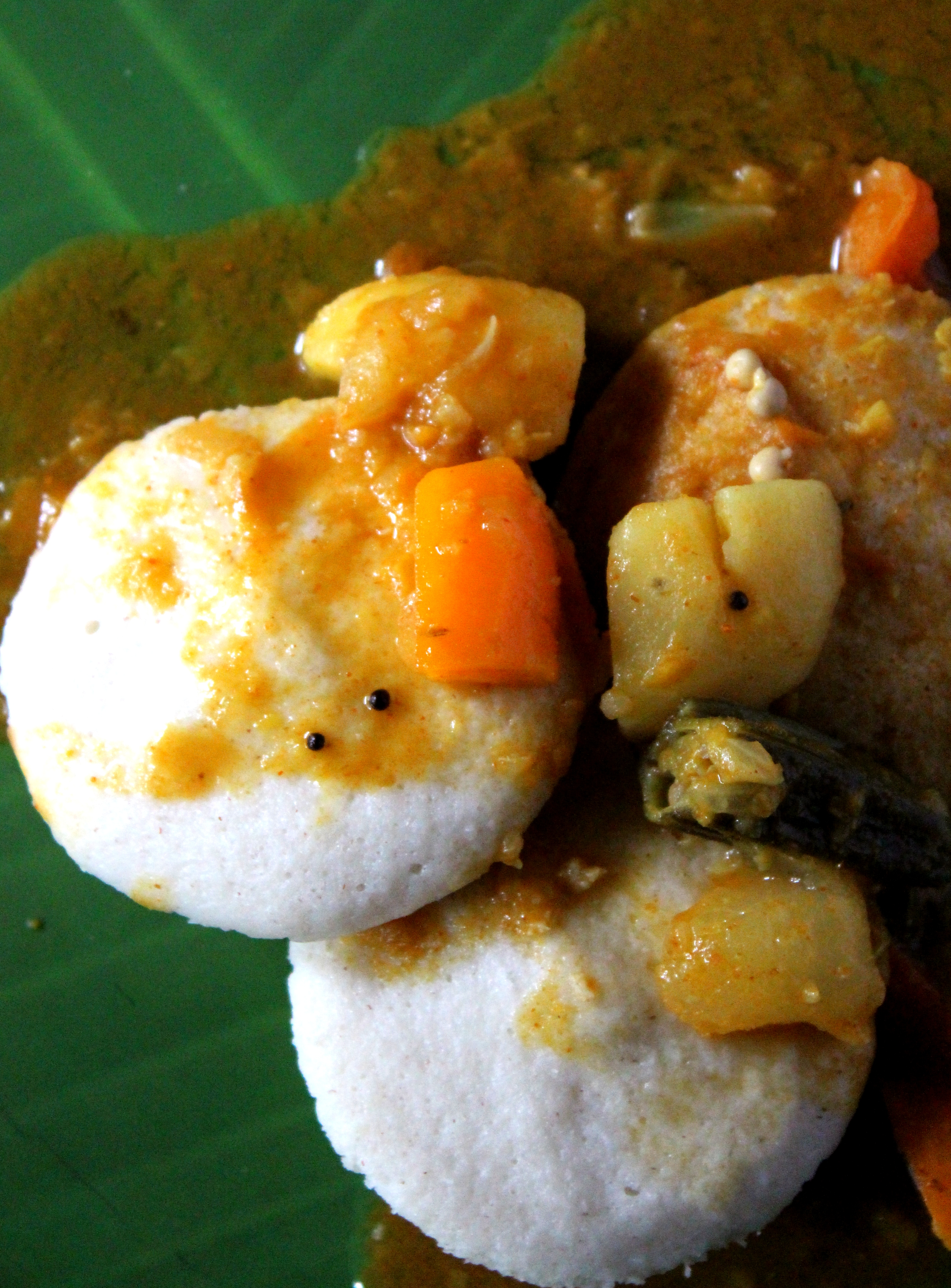
Sambar idli as served in Tamil Nadu

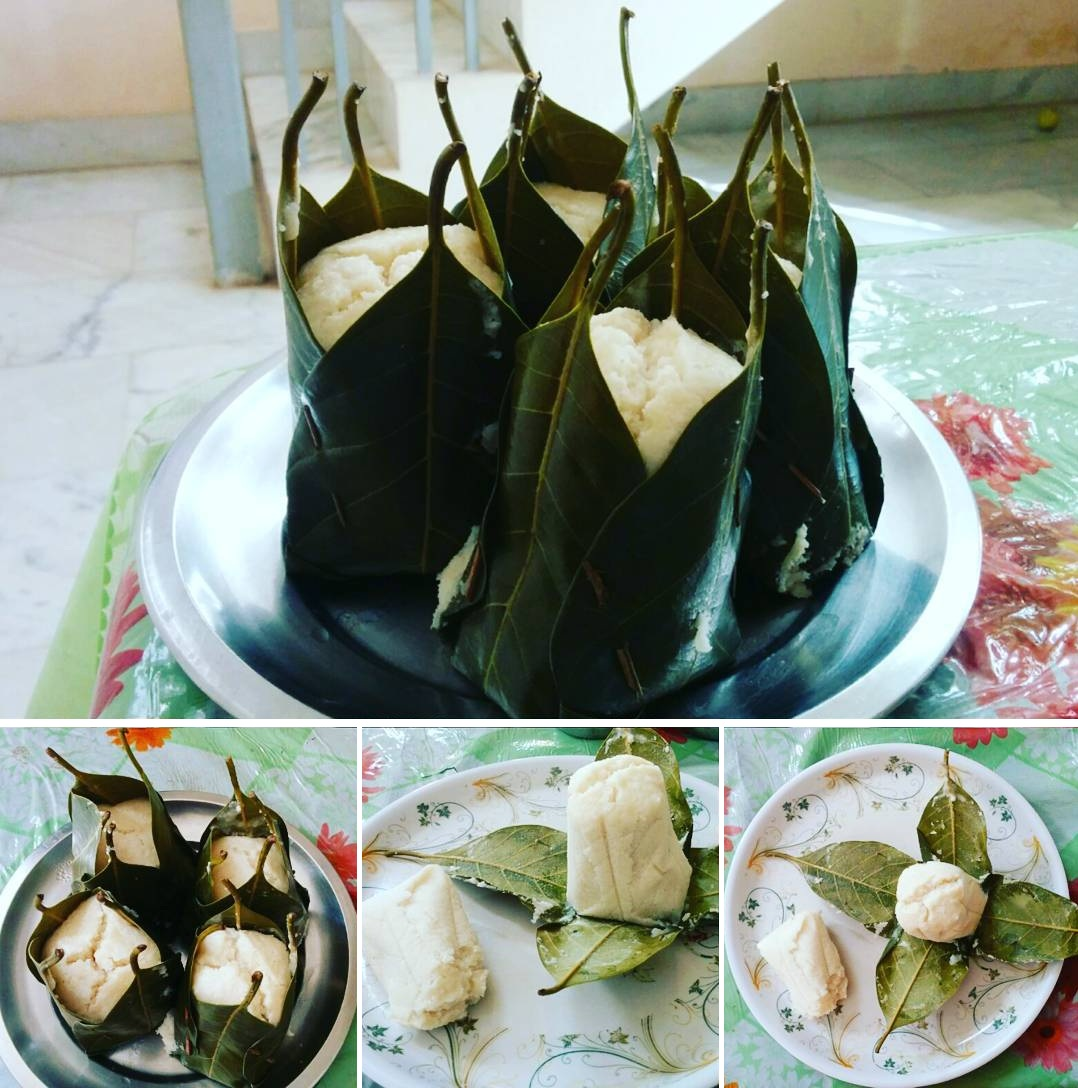
Kotte kadubu or Pottikkalu idlis steamed in jackfruit leaves, in Karnataka and Andhra Pradesh

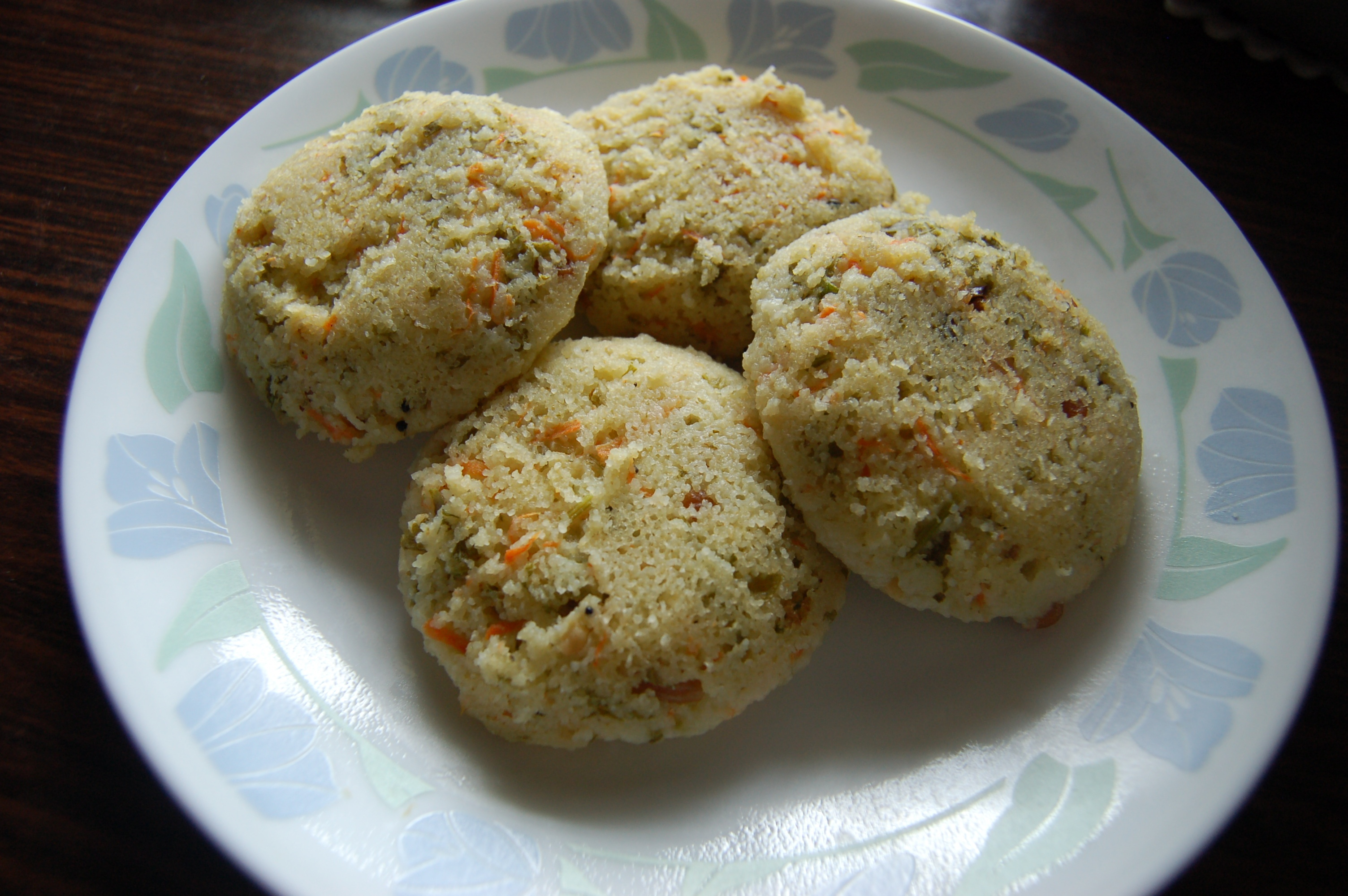
Rave idli (sooji idli) is a specialty of Karnataka

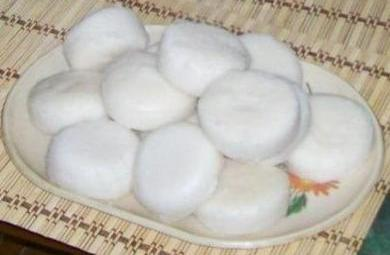
Sanna(s), a Goan variant of idli, also known as hittli in Konkani, is made with Toddy for fermentation.

== Batter fermentation ==
Fermentation of idli batter results in both leavening caused by the generation of carbon dioxide as well as an increase in acidity. This fermentation is performed by lactic acid bacteria, especially the heterofermentative strain Leuconostoc mesenteroides and the homofermentative strain Enterococcus faecalis (formerly classified as Streptococcus faecalis). Heterofermentative lactic acid bacteria such as L. mesenteroides generate both lactic acid as well as carbon dioxide whereas homofermentative lactic acid bacteria only generate lactic acid.

Both L. mesenteroides and E. faecalis are predominantly delivered to the batter by the black gram. Both strains start multiplying while the grains are soaking and continue to do so after grinding.

L. mesenteroides tolerates high concentrations of salt unlike most other bacteria. Hence the salt in the batter and the ongoing generation of lactic acid both suppress the growth of other undesirable micro-organisms.

== Idli Day ==
March 30 is celebrated as World Idli Day. It was first celebrated in 2015 at Chennai.

== See also ==
- Bhapa pitha
- Cuisine of Karnataka
- Dhokla
- List of Indian breads
- List of steamed foods
- Puttu
- Rava idli
- Sanna

== Bibliography ==
- K. T. Achaya (12 May 1994). Indian Food: A Historical Companion. Oxford University Press, USA. ISBN 978-0-19-563448-8.
- Devi, Yamuna (1987). Lord Krishna's Cuisine: The Art of Indian Vegetarian Cooking, Dutton. ISBN 0-525-24564-2.
- Edward R. Farnworth (2003). Handbook of Fermented Functional Foods. CRC Press. ISBN 978-0-8493-1372-1.
- Jaffrey, Madhur (1988). A Taste of India, Atheneum. ISBN 0-689-70726-6
- Rau, Santha Rama (1969). The Cooking of India, Time-Life Books.
