= Semolina =

Coarse, purified milled wheat

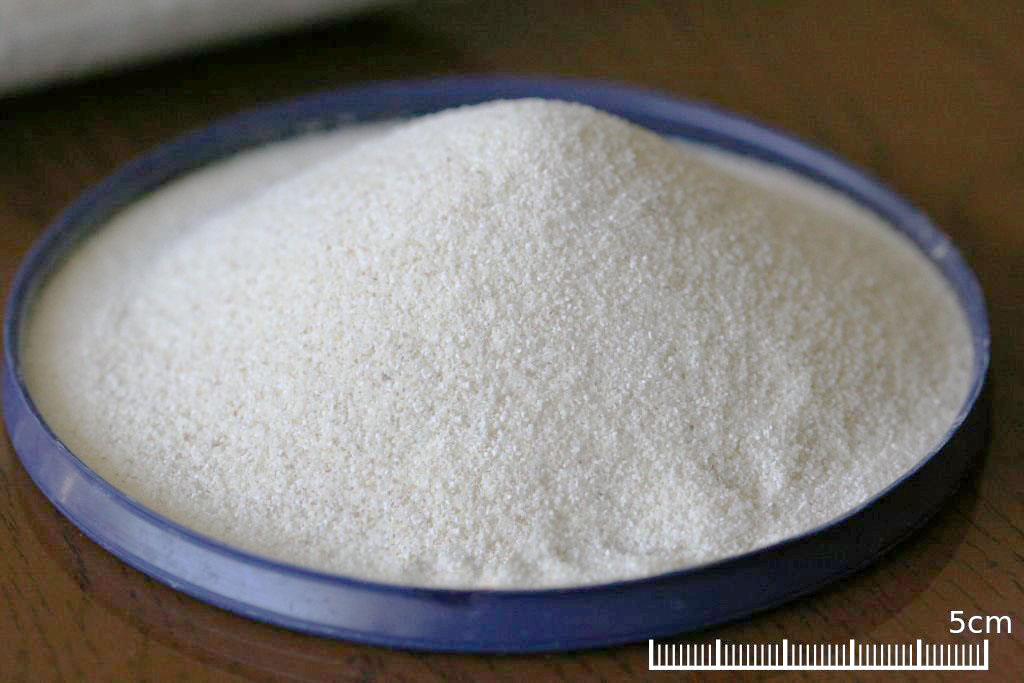

Nutritional value per 100 g (3.5 oz)
- Energy: 1,506 kJ (360 kcal)
- Carbohydrates: 72.83 g
- Dietary fiber: 3.9 g
- Fat: 1.05 g
- Saturated: 0.15 g
- Monounsaturated: 0.124 g
- Polyunsaturated: 0.43 g
- Protein: 12.68 g
Vitamins and minerals
Vitamins	Quantity %DV^{†}
Vitamin A equiv.	0% 0 μg
Thiamine (B1)	23% 0.28 mg
Riboflavin (B2)	6% 0.08 mg
Niacin (B3)	21% 3.31 mg
Vitamin B6	6% 0.1 mg
Folate (B9)	18% 72 μg
Vitamin B12	0% 0 μg
Vitamin C	0% 0 mg
Minerals	Quantity %DV^{†}
Calcium	1% 17 mg
Copper	22% 0.2 mg
Iron	7% 1.23 mg
Magnesium	11% 47 mg
Phosphorus	11% 136 mg
Potassium	6% 186 mg
Selenium	14% 7.74 μg
Sodium	0% 1 mg
Zinc	10% 1.05 mg
- Other constituents: Quantity
- Water: 12.67 g
- ^{†}Percentages estimated using US recommendations for adults, except for potassium, which is estimated based on expert recommendation from the National Academies.

Semolina is a coarse flour traditionally made from durum wheat. Its high protein and gluten content make it especially suitable for pasta.

Semolina is distinguished from other refined wheat flours by its coarse texture: the Codex Alimentarius specifies that a durum wheat semolina must have grains large enough that no more than 79% pass through a 315-micron textile sieve.

== Etymology ==
The word "semolina", attested since 1790–1800, is derived from the Italian word semolino, an alteration of semola ('coarse grains', from Latin simila, 'fine flour') with the diminutive suffix -ino. The Latin word is of ultimately Semitic origin, with the original meaning of 'to grind into groats'; cf. Arabic samīd (سميد, 'semolina') and Aramaic səmīḏā (ܣܡܻܝܕܳܐ, 'fine flour').

== Production ==
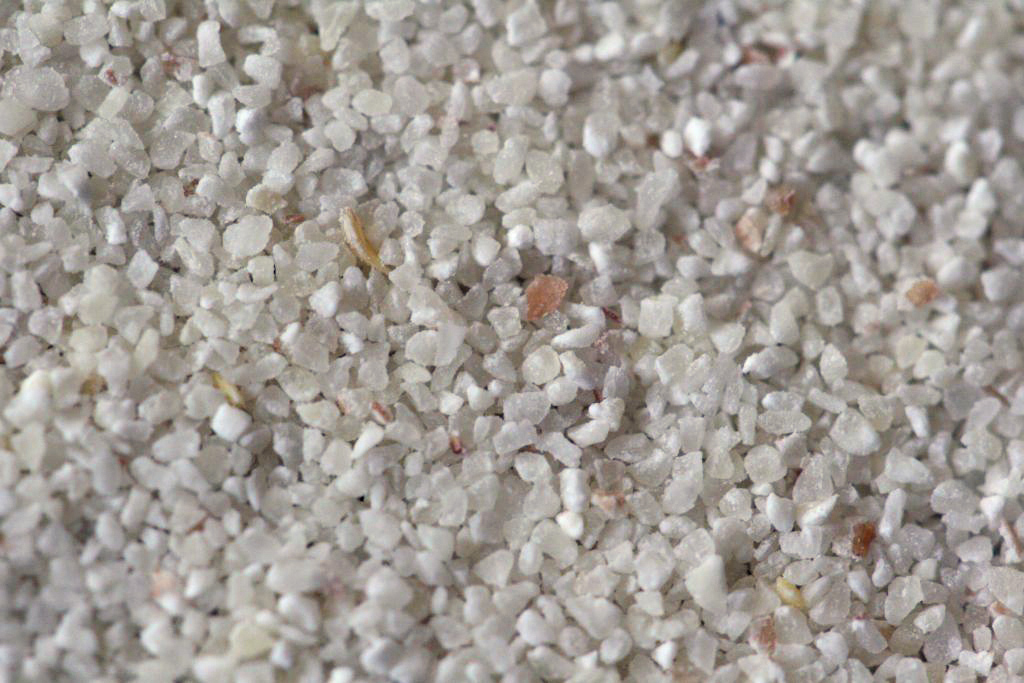
Semolina grains in close-up

Modern milling of wheat into flour is a process that employs grooved steel rollers. The rollers are adjusted so that the space between them is slightly narrower than the width of the wheat kernels. As the wheat is fed into the mill, the rollers flake off the bran and germ while the starch (or endosperm) is cracked into coarse pieces in the process. Through sifting, these endosperm particles, the semolina, are separated from the bran. The semolina is then ground into flour. This greatly simplifies the process of separating the endosperm from the bran and germ, as well as making it possible to separate the endosperm into different grades because the inner part of the endosperm tends to break down into smaller pieces than the outer part. Different grades of flour can thus be produced.

== Types ==
Semolina made from hard durum wheat (Triticum turgidum subsp. durum) is pale yellow in color. It may be milled either coarse or fine, and both are used in a wide variety of sweet and savory dishes, including many types of pasta.

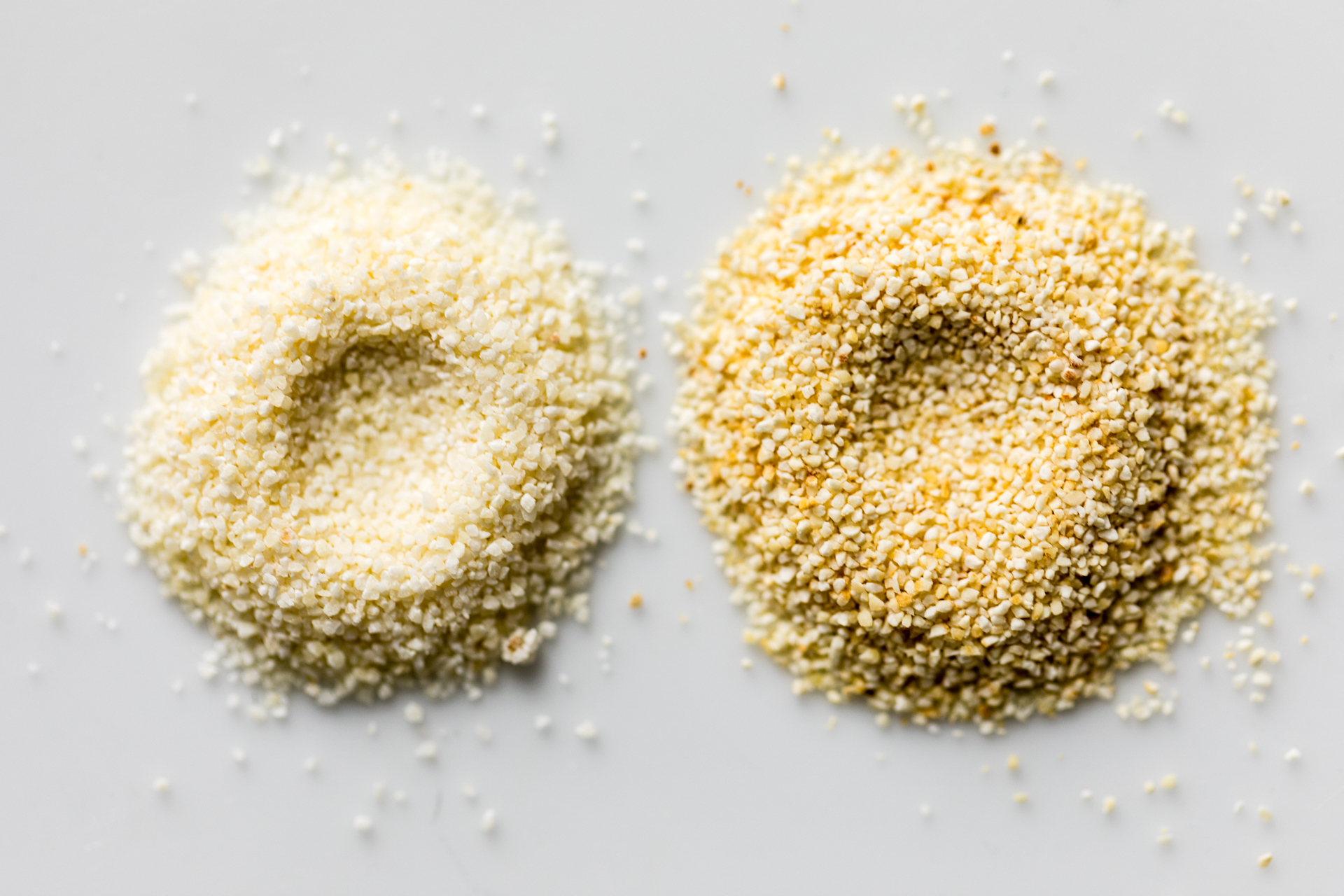
Semolina ground, plain (left) and toasted (right)

Semolina made from common wheat (Triticum aestivum) is beige in color. In the United States, it is called farina (not to be confused with Italian farina, which is common-wheat flour), and it is used more often for desserts than for savory foods. On the Indian subcontinent, common-wheat semolina may be milled either coarse or fine, and both are used in a wide variety of both sweet and savory dishes. Common names in other languages include:

- Arabic: samīd سميد; coarse ḵašin خشن, fine nāʿim ناعم
- Assamese: sūjī চুজি
- Bangla: śūjī সুজি
- Finnish: manna, mannaryyni
- German: Grieß
- Greek: simigdáli σιμιγδάλι; coarse chondró χονδρό, fine psiló ψιλό
- Gujarati: sōjī સોજી
- Hindustani: baṃsī ravā, bansi rava बंसी रवा (milled only coarse, not fine)
- Hindustani: sūjī सूजी/سوجی, or ravā रवा; coarse moṭī मोटी, fine bārīk बारीक
- Italian: semola di grano duro; coarse (no descriptor), fine rimacinata
- Kannada: rave ರವೆ
- Kannada: bansi rave ಬನ್ಸಿ ರವೆ (coarsely milled)
- Malayalam: ṟava റവ
- Dhivehi: ravā ރަވާ
- Marathi: ravā रवा
- Nepali: sūjī सूजी
- Punjabi: sūjī ਸੂਜੀ
- Sinhala: rulang රුලං
- Tamil: ravai ரவை
- Telugu: ravva రవ్వ
- Turkish: irmik; coarse iri, fine ince
- Urdu: sooji سوجی
- Russian: манная каша, манка, манная крупа

In the United States, meal produced from grains other than wheat may also be referred to as semolina, e.g., rice semolina and corn semolina. Corn semolina is commonly called grits in the United States.

== Dishes ==
=== Savory ===
In Germany, Austria, Hungary, Bosnia-Herzegovina, Bulgaria, Serbia, Slovenia, Romania, Slovakia and Croatia, (durum) semolina is known as (Hartweizen-)Grieß (a word related to "grits") and is mixed with egg to make Grießknödel, which can be added to soup. The particles are fairly coarse, between 0.25 and 0.75 millimeters in diameter. It is also cooked in milk and sprinkled with chocolate to be eaten as breakfast.

In Italy, (durum) semolina is used to make a type of soup by directly boiling fine semolina in vegetable or chicken broth. Semolina can also be used for making a type of gnocchi called gnocchi alla romana, where semolina is mixed with milk, cheese and butter to form a log, then cut in discs and baked with cheese and bechamel.

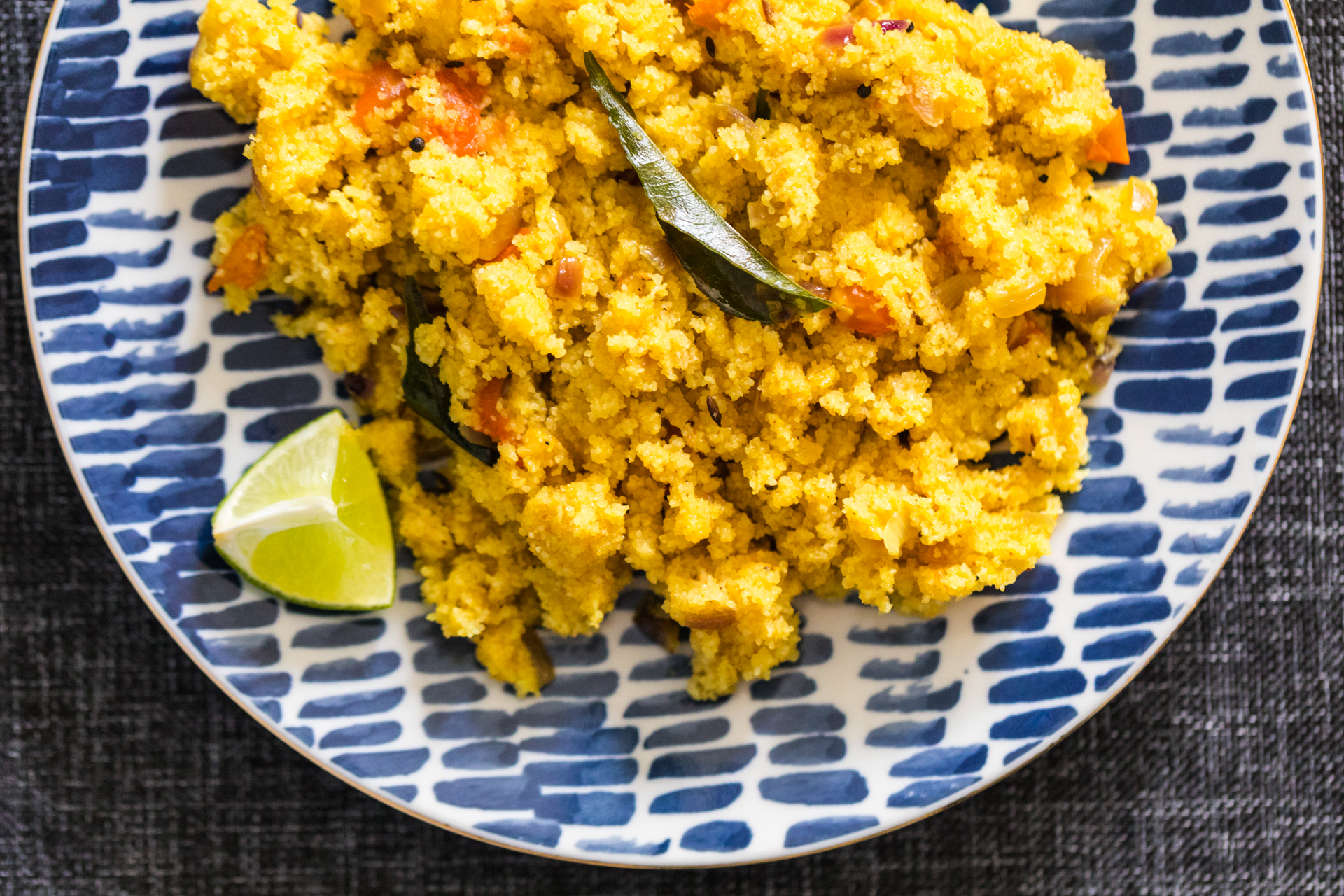
Upma, or sanza, a savory dish made across India

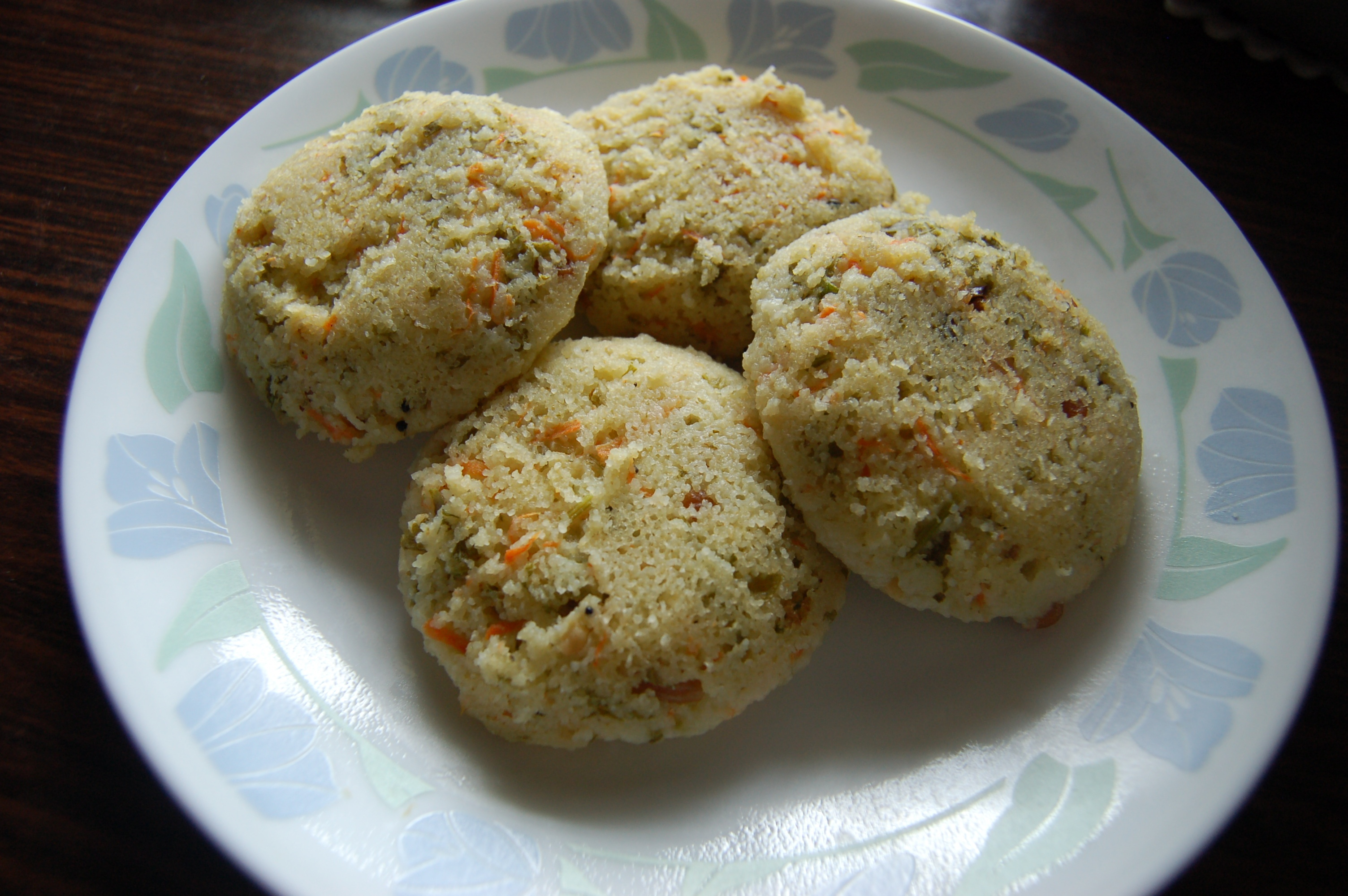
Steamed savory semolina rava idlis

Semolina is a common food in West Africa, especially among Nigerians. It is eaten as either lunch or dinner with stew or soup. It is prepared just like eba (cassava flour) or fufu with water and boiled for 5 to 10 minutes.

In much of North Africa, durum semolina is made into the staple couscous and different kinds of flat breads like m'semen, kesra, khobz and other.

In North India and Pakistan semolina is called sooji, and in South India, rava. Semolina is used to make savory South Indian foods, such as rava dosa, rava idli, rava kitchri and upma. It is used to coat slices of fish before it is pan-fried in oil. Rotis can also be made from semolina.

=== Sweet ===
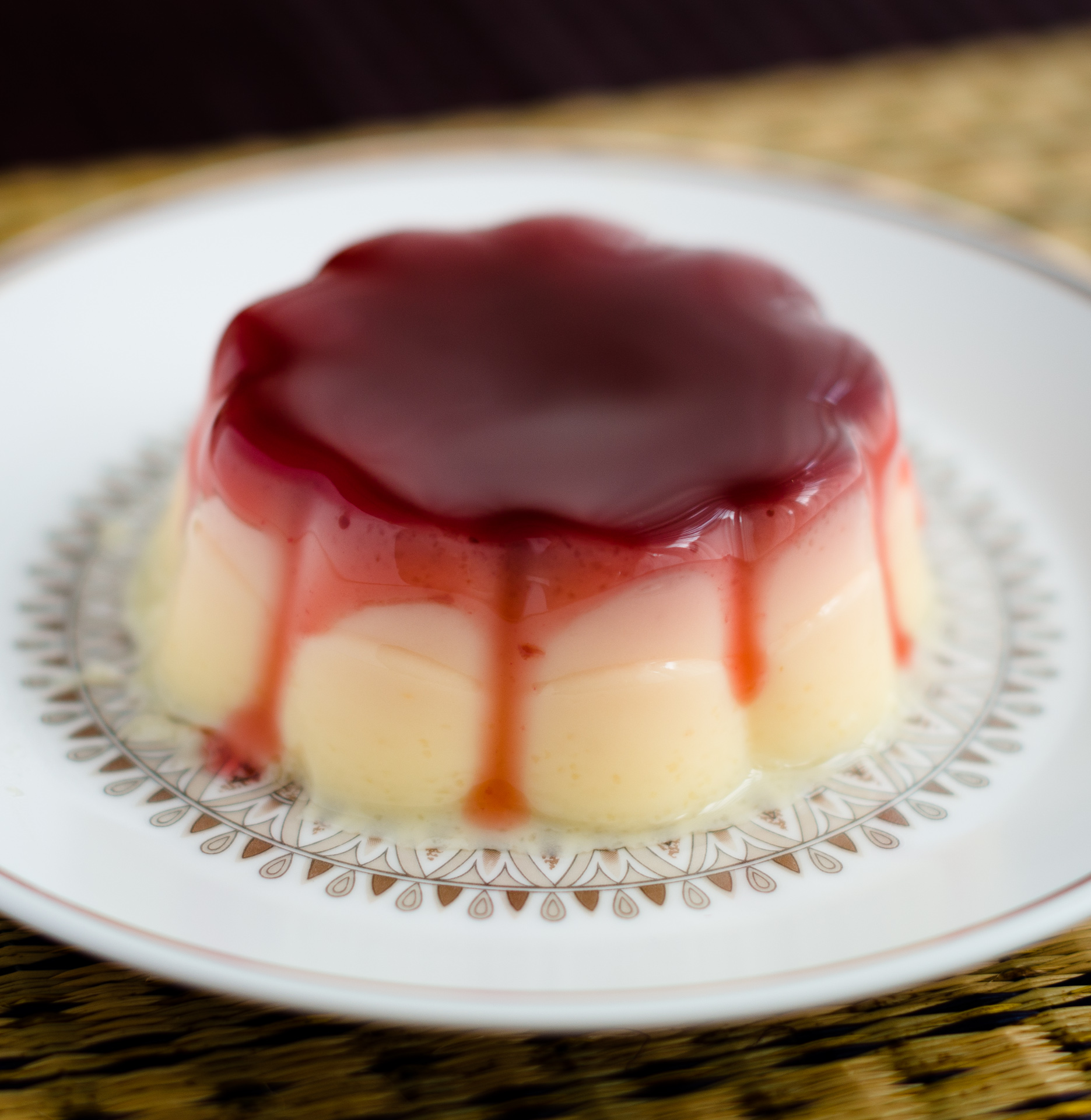
Dutch semolina pudding (griesmeelpudding) with a redcurrant sauce

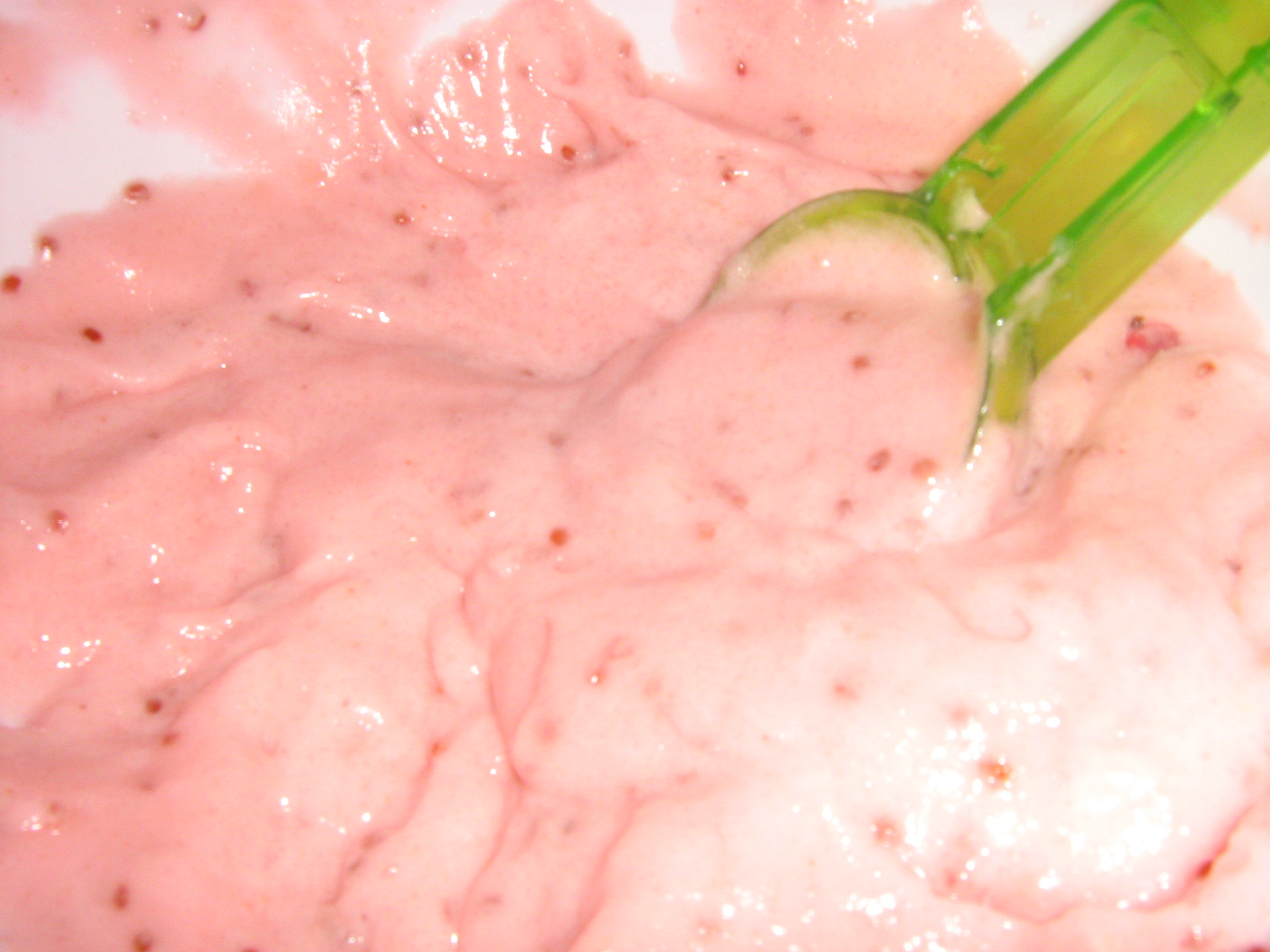
Redcurrant semolina mousse (jāņogu debesmanna)

In Austria, Germany, Hungary, Bulgaria, Bosnia-Herzegovina, Slovenia, Serbia, Romania, Croatia, Slovakia, and the Czech Republic, common wheat semolina is called Weichweizengrieß in German, but is often referred to as Grieß. It is often cooked with milk and sugar or cooked with just milk and then topped with sugar, cinnamon, Ovaltine or other sweet toppings. A dollop of butter is also often added. This dish is called Grießkoch in Austria, Grießbrei in Germany, and semolina pudding in English. Grießauflauf consists of semolina mixed with whipped egg whites, and sometimes fruit or nuts, and then baked in the oven.

A baked dish containing semolina called migliaccio is found in the Neapolitan tradition in Italy. Migliaccio is a mixture of ricotta, vanilla and citrus peel, similar to the filling in sfogliatelle, with added semolina flour to obtain a simple, firm cake.

In Russia, Slovakia, Sweden, Estonia, Finland, Lithuania, Latvia, Poland, Romania, Ukraine, Belarus, and Israel, it is eaten as a breakfast porridge, sometimes mixed with raisins and served with milk. In Swedish, it is known as mannagrynsgröt, or boiled together with blueberries, as blåbärsgröt. In Sweden, Estonia, Finland, and Latvia, semolina is boiled together with juice from berries and then whipped into a light, airy consistency to create klappgröt (Swedish name), also known as vispipuuro (Finnish name) or mannavaht (Estonian name) or debessmanna (Latvian name). This dessert is often eaten in the summer.

In the Middle East and North Africa, basbousa (also called harisa in some varieties of Arabic) is a sweet semolina cake soaked in fragrant syrup and frequently topped with nuts. In North Africa, it is also used to make harcha, a kind of griddle cake often eaten for breakfast, commonly with jam or honey. Baghrir, a North African pancake, is also made with semolina or flour that is served for breakfast.

In India, semolina (called rava, suji, shuji) is used for sweets such as halwa, rava kesari and seviyan kheer. In Nepal, semolina is called suji and is used for preparing sweet dishes such as haluwa or puwa. In Myanmar (Burma), semolina (called shwegyi) is used in a popular dessert called sanwin makin. In Sri Lanka semolina is called rulan and used to make creamy porridge and a sweet confection called "rulan aluwa".

Halwa is sometimes made with semolina cooked with sugar, butter, milk, or pine nuts. It is a popular treat in Turkey (helva), Greece, (halvas), Cyprus (halvas), Bulgaria (halva), Iran (halva), Pakistan (halva), Bangladesh (halua), Palestine (halawa). In Turkey, sweet dishes called revani, şekerpare and şambali are made with semolina. In Greece, the dessert galaktoboureko is made by making a custard from the semolina and then wrapping it in phyllo sheets. In Cyprus, the semolina may be mixed also with almond cordial to create a light, water-based pudding.

== In baking ==
As an alternative to corn meal, semolina can be used to dust the baking surface to prevent sticking. In bread and pizza making, the high gluten content of semolina adds firmness and chewiness to the crust.

== See also ==
- Guriev porridge
- Bombay rava
- Couscous
