= NY Dosas =

Food cart in New York City

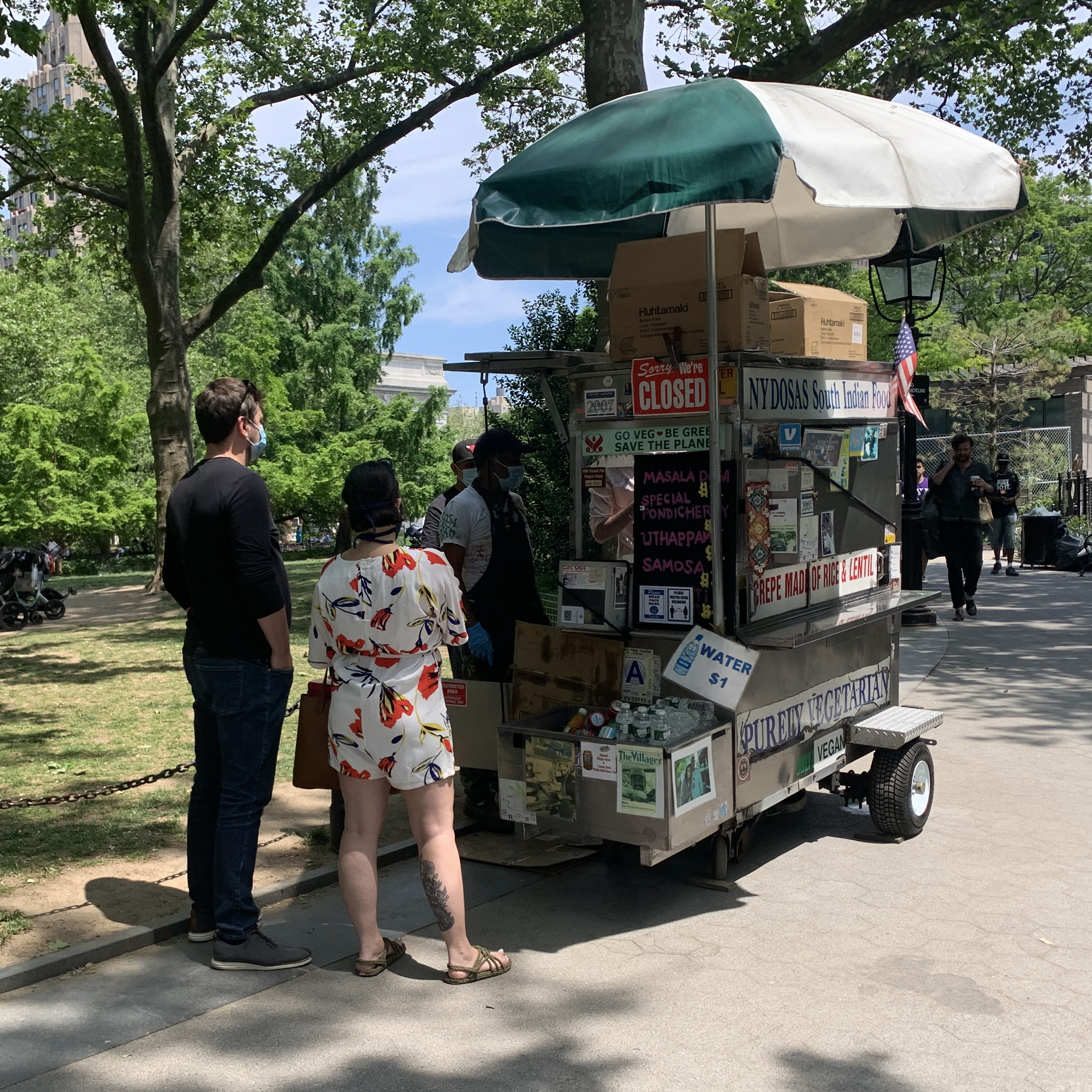
- NY Dosas in May 2021
- Interactive map of NY Dosas

Restaurant information
- Established: 2001-present
- Owner: Thiru Kumar
- Food type: Street Food
- Rating: 4.5
- Location: 50 Washington Square S, New York, NY 10014, New York City, NY, NYC, New York, United States
- Coordinates: 40.730778°N 73.998861°W

NY Dosas is a food cart located in Washington Square Park, New York City, in the state of New York. NY Dosas is owned by Thiru Kumar who is from Jaffna, Sri Lanka.

== Fare ==
NY Dosas is a food cart located at Washington Square Park, New York. NY Dosas sells dosas, a Sri Lankan Tamil crepe made of rice and lentils. Dosas are served with coconut chutney and sambar, it also comes with various veggie options. NY Dosas is ranked 16th as one of top twenty best food carts in New York by New York Magazine.
