= Pesarattu =

Type of Indian bread

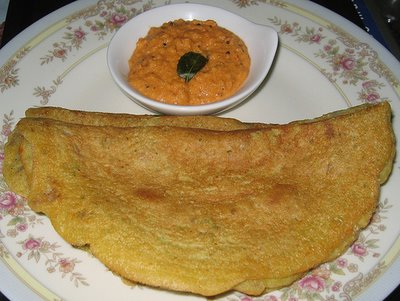
- Pesarattu
- Course: Breakfast, snack
- Place of origin: Coastal region of Andhra Pradesh, India
- Region or state: Andhra Pradesh, India
- Main ingredients: Green gram

Pesarattu (Telugu: పెసరట్టు; lit. 'green gram pancake'), pesara attu, pesara dosa (mung bean dosa), or cheeldo is a crepe-like bread, originating in Andhra Pradesh, India, that is a variety of dosa. It is made with green gram batter, but, unlike a typical dosa, it does not contain Vigna mungo. Pesarattu is eaten as breakfast and as a snack in Andhra Pradesh. It is typically served with ginger chutney, peanut chutney or tamarind chutney. Green chilies, ginger and onions are used in variants.

== Upma pesarattu ==
A pesarattu stuffed with upma is known as upma pesarattu. It is popular in Andhra Pradesh cities. Upma pesarattu is a favourite in the Coastal Andhra, region especially the West Godavari District, East Godavari District, Krishna District, Guntur district especially in Planadu regions of Guntur District, Guntur and Vijayawada cities and Visakhapatnam District.

== Variations ==
Similar variations found in North Indian cuisine are moong daal ka cheela or besan ka cheela. In Rajasthan they are commonly known as cheelo.

== Preparation ==
The first step is soaking the "pesalu" (moong beans) or whole green gram (a 150 ml cup of gram makes about four medium pesarattus) in water for at least four hours (maximum of seven hours). The soaked gram is then ground to a smooth paste with a couple of green chilies, a small piece of ginger, and some salt. Water is added as required. The mixture is allowed to sit for a few minutes to ensure that the interiors of the grains are fully hydrated.

The batter is poured onto a heated pan. The pesarattu will slowly start to get crispy over the edges and start to unstick from the pan. In professional cooking facilities, due to the high temperatures of the pan, there is usually no need to flip the pesarattu. In domestic settings, the pesarattu is usually flipped, to cook it completely.

Chopped onions and chilies are sometimes added to the pesarattu by spreading them over the batter before it becomes a crepe; upma is similarly used. In some places, both upma and onions are added to pesarattu.

== See also ==
- List of Indian breads
