= Uttapam =

Type of dosa from South India

Uttappam
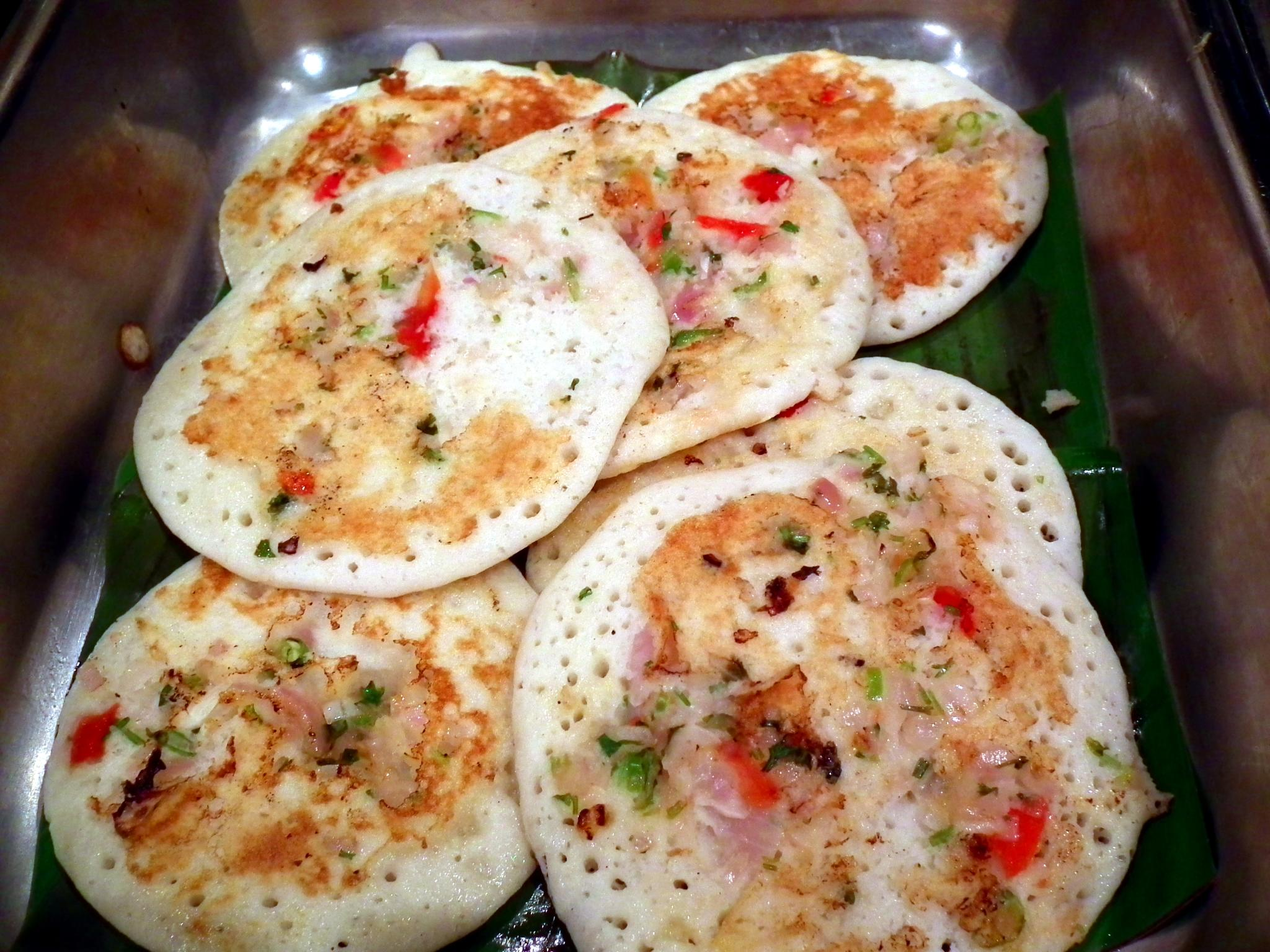
- Mini-uttapams
- Alternative names: Uttappam, oothappam
- Place of origin: India
- Region or state: South India
- Main ingredients: Rice flour, urad dal

An uttapam, uthappam, oothappam, uthapam, utapam or uttappam is a type of dosa from South India. Unlike a typical dosa, which is crisp and crepe-like, an uttapam is thicker, with toppings. The name is derived from the Tamil words appam and utthia or uttria, meaning "poured appam", because appam is cooked in a round-bottom pan, whereas utthia-appam is cooked on a flat skillet. Tamil ancient literature mentions it by name. The classic breakfast of Tamil residents consists of idli, dosas or uttappams mostly accompanied by sambar and chutney.

It is similar to a dosa, but it has more vegetables and a longer preparation time.

== Preparation ==
Uttapam batter is made of a 1:3 ratio of urad dal and rice. The rice can be a combination of parboiled rice and a regular variety such as long-grain rice, sona masoori, or others. The lentils and rice are soaked overnight and ground into a batter. The batter is fermented until it rises. With the help of a ladle the batter is spread on a hot pan, generally circular, toppings are spread on it and patted gently. Oil is dripped around it and it is flipped after it turns golden brown. Oil is dripped again, and it is flipped once more to make sure the second surface is baked too. The uttapam is then ready to be served and eaten.

Uttapams are traditionally made with toppings such as tomatoes, onion, chillies, capsicum, and coriander; other common choices are coconut, grated carrots, and beets. They are often eaten with sambar or chutney.

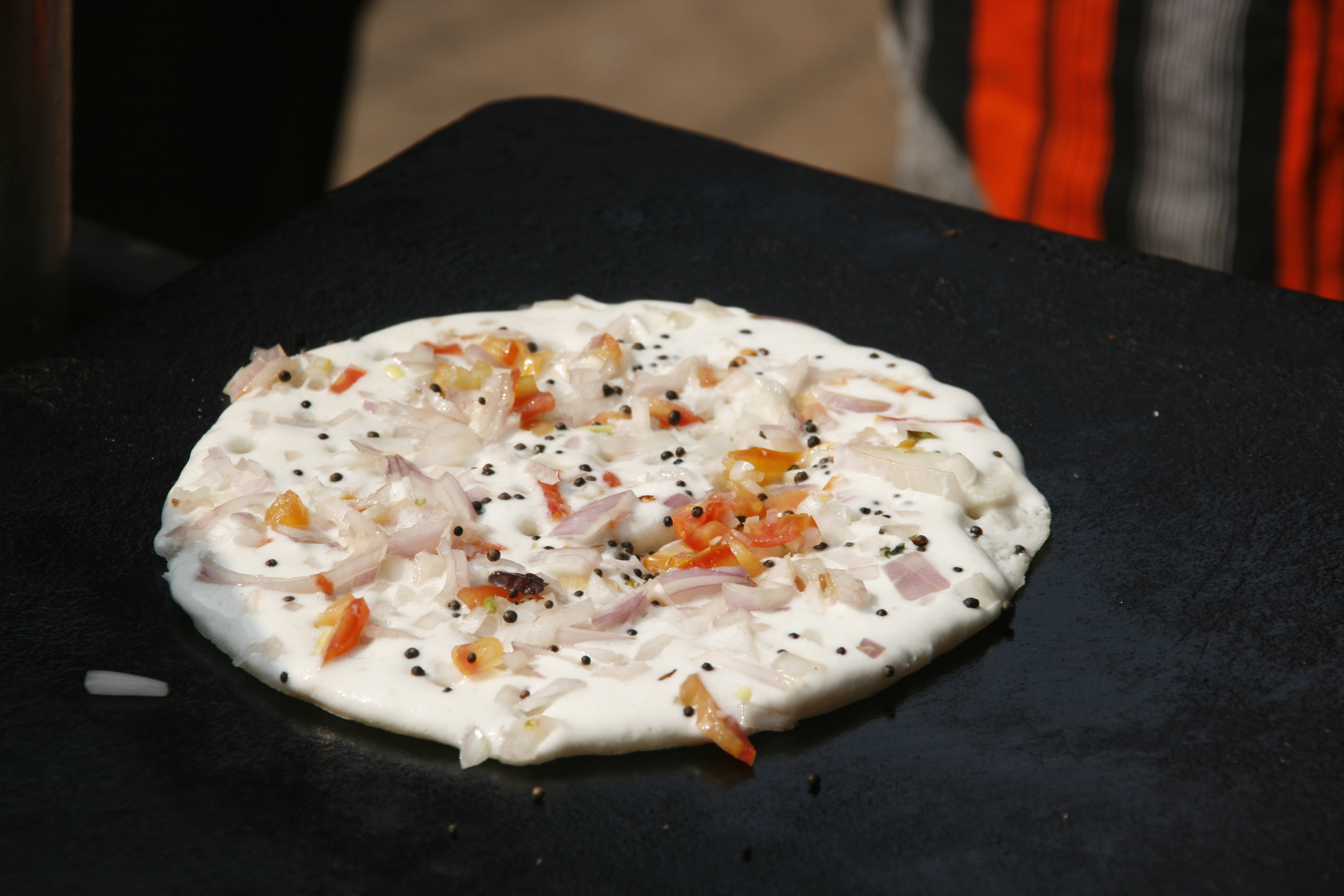
Uttapam from the streets of Varanasi (2007)

== See also ==
- List of Indian breads
- List of pancakes
