= Dosa (food) =

Thin batter bread originating from South India

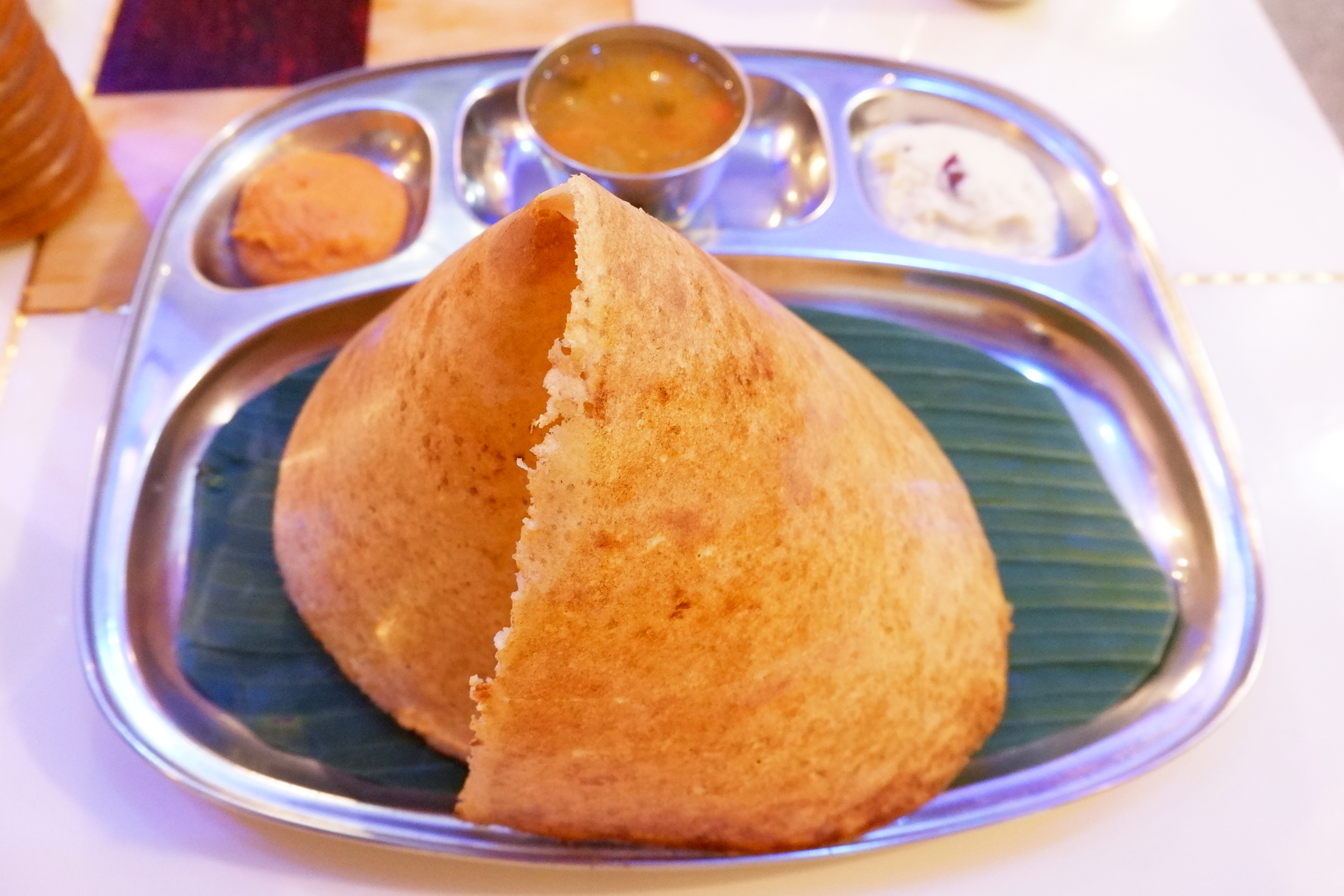
- Dosa with sambar and chutney
- Type: Pancake, crepe
- Place of origin: Southern India
- Serving temperature: Hot
- Main ingredients: Rice and black gram
- Variations: Masala dosa, rava dosa, ghee roast dosa, podi dosa, paneer dosa, plain dosa, and many more

A dosa (in Indian English) or thosai (in Malaysian English and Singapore English) is a thin, savoury batter bread in South Indian cuisine made from a fermented batter of ground black gram and rice. Dosas are served hot, often with chutney and sambar.

== History ==
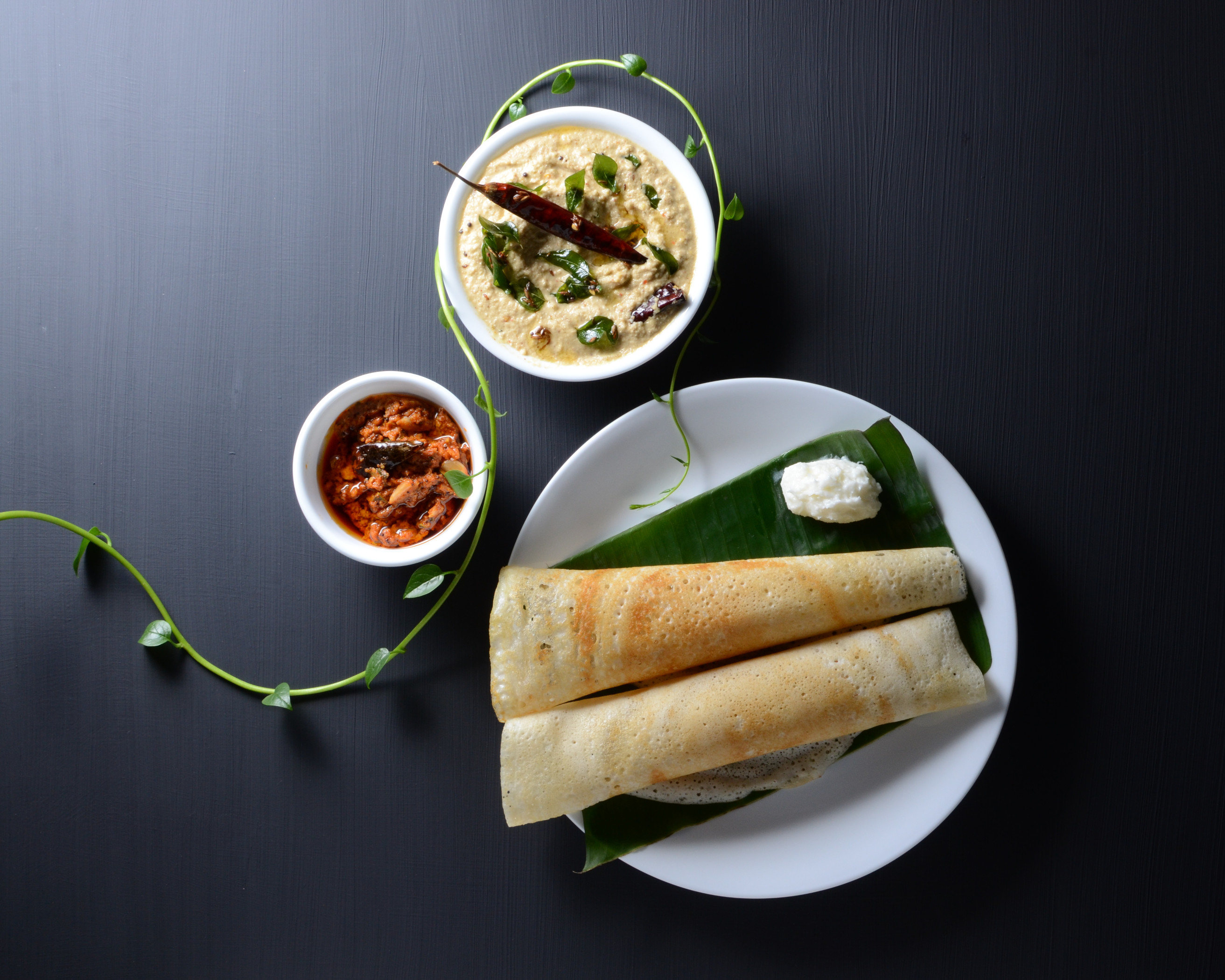
Plain dosas with condiments

Ghee dosa served with sambhar and coconut chutney

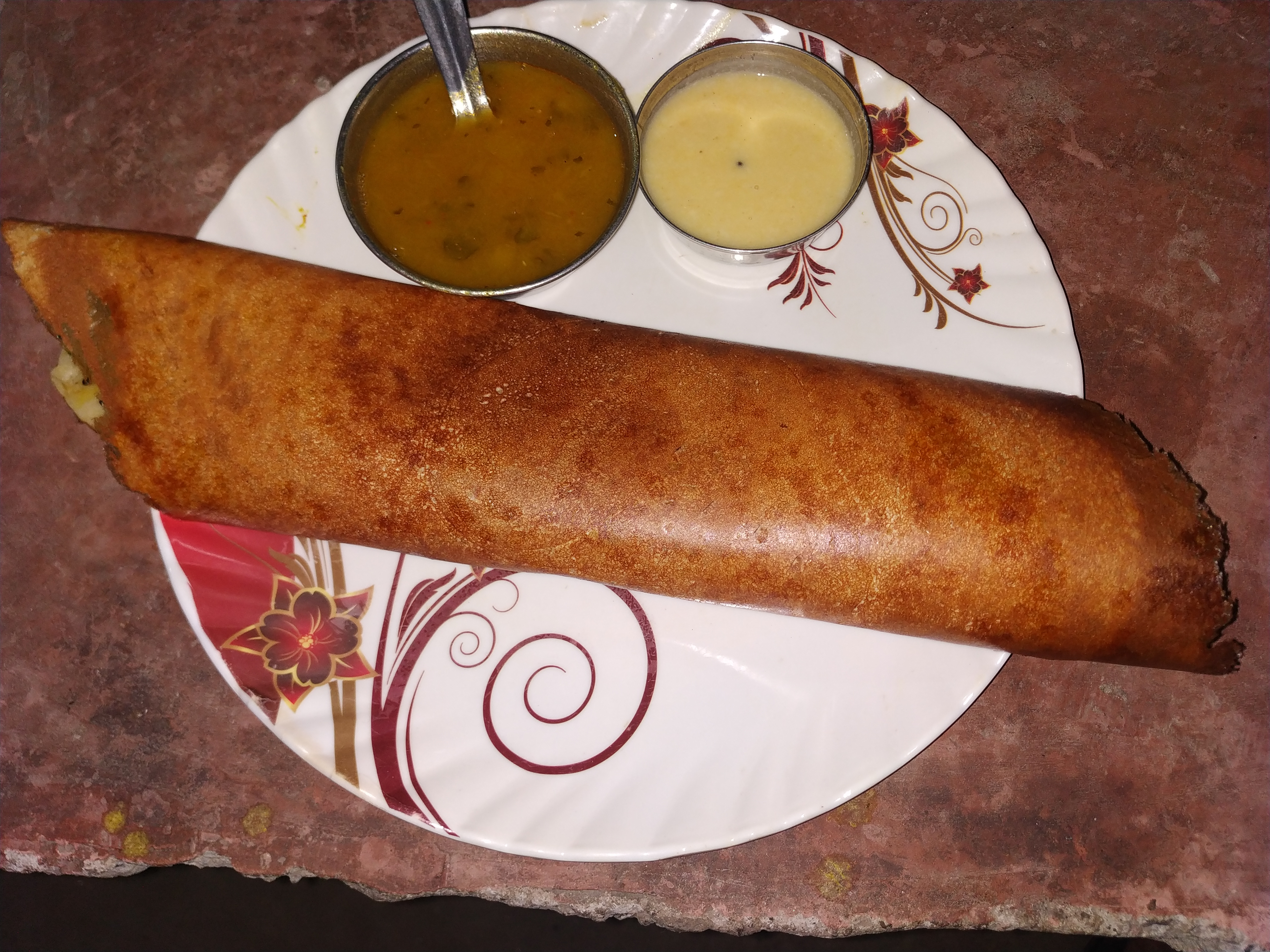
Butter dosa served with coconut chutney and sambhar

The dosa originated in South India, but its precise geographical origins are unknown. According to food historian K. T. Achaya, references in the Sangam literature suggest that dosa was already in use in the ancient Tamil country around the first century CE. However, according to historian P. Thankappan Nair, dosa originated in the town of Udupi in Karnataka. Achaya states that the earliest written mention of dosa appears in the eighth-century literature of present-day Tamil Nadu, while the earliest mention of dosa in Kannada literature appears a century later.

In popular tradition, the origin of the dosa is linked to Udupi, probably because of the dish's association with Udupi restaurants. The Tamil Nadu dosa is traditionally softer and thicker; the thinner and crispier version of dosa, which became popular across India, was first made in present-day Karnataka. A recipe for dosa can be found in Manasollasa, a 12th-century Sanskrit encyclopedia compiled by Someshvara III, who ruled from present-day Karnataka.

The dosa arrived in Mumbai with the opening of Udupi restaurants in the 1930s. After India's independence in 1947, South Indian cuisine became increasingly popular in North India. In New Delhi, the Madras Hotel in Connaught Place became one of the first restaurants to serve South Indian cuisine.

Dosas, like many other dishes of South Indian cuisine, were introduced in Ceylon (Sri Lanka) by South Indian emigrants during British rule. Tirunelveli and Tuticorin merchants who settled there were instrumental in the spreading of South Indian cookery across the island by opening restaurants (vegetarian hotels) to meet initially the needs of the emigrant population. Dosa has found its way into the culinary habits of the Sri Lankan people, where it has evolved into an island-specific version which is quite distinct from the Indian dosa. In both forms, it is called those (තෝසේ or [t̪oːse]) or thosai (தோசை or [t̪oːsaɪ̯]) in Sinhala and in Sri Lankan Tamil.

In Odisha, Chakuli Pithas are made which are quite similar to Dosa, but they are served flat or with a single fold, whereas Dosas are arranged in different styles. Also, they aren't filled with stuffings unlike Dosa. There is a variation, such as Budha Chakuli, where fruits, raisins, grated coconut and jaggery are added to the batter. Also, Chakuli Pithas are not served with Chutney and Sambhar but wide-ranging accompaniments, such as any Bhaja/Tarkari/Dalma or simple ones like Jaggery/Sugar. The batter consists of less rice than gram (biri).

In Konkan, there are some traditional dishes similar or related to the Dosa, known as polo in Concanese.

As in Sri Lanka, dosa was introduced far abroad since the early 18th century, by the migration of the Indian Tamil diaspora to Southeast Asia and later in the Western world, and through the worldwide popularisation of Indian and Sri Lankan cuisines since the second half of the 20th century.

== Names ==
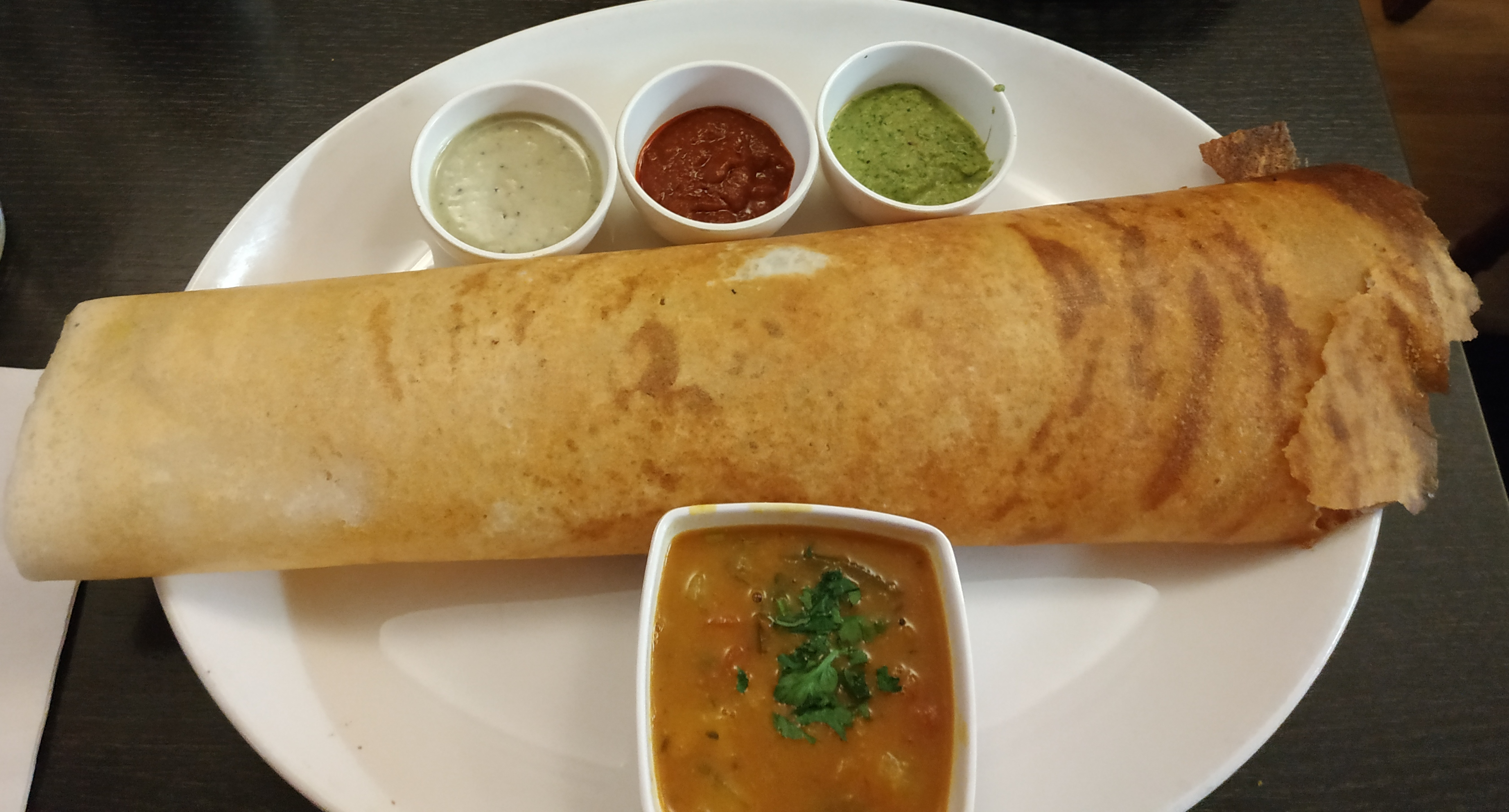
Dosa with chutney and sambar with sauteed potato filling in a restaurant

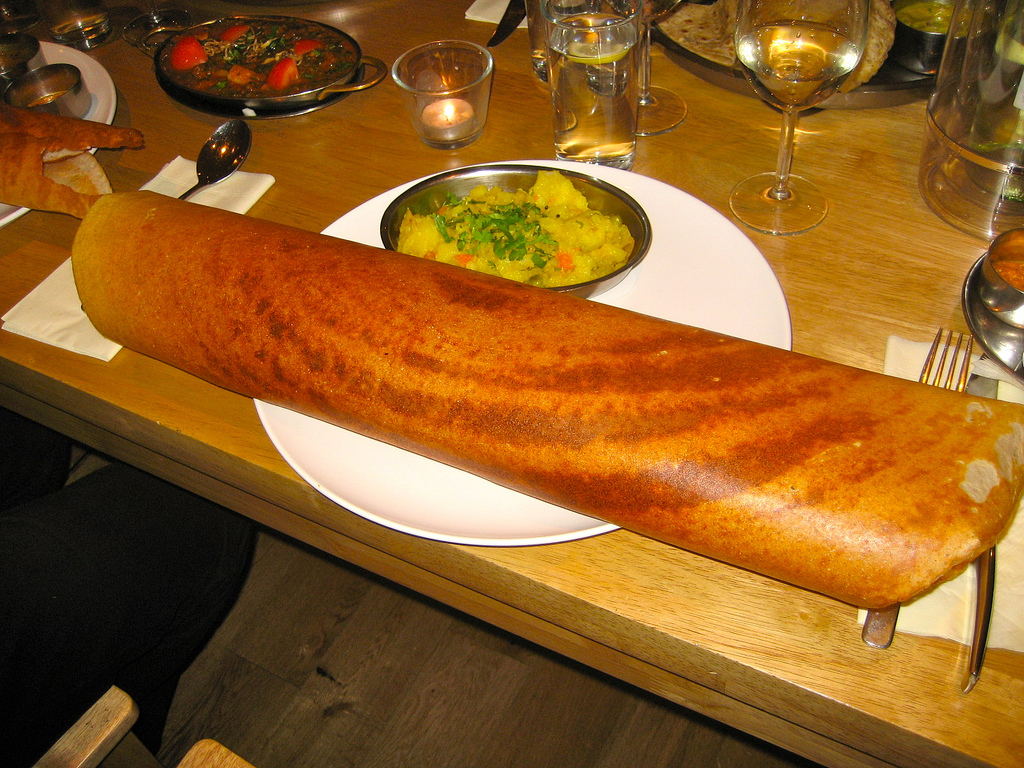
Dosa served with sautéed potatoes

Dosa is the anglicised name of a variety of South Indian names for the dish, for example, dosai in Tamil, dōsaë in Tulu, dōse in Kannada and Telugu, dōse in Malayalam and Chakuli Pitha in Odia.

The standard transliterations and pronunciations of the word in various South Indian languages are:

Language	Transliteration	Pronunciation (IPA)
Kannada: ದೋಸೆ	dōse	[d̪oːse]
Konkani: पोळो	poḷo	[ˈpɔ̞.ɭɔ̞]
Malayalam: ദോശ	dōśa	[d̪oːʃa]
Tamil: தோசை	dōsai	[d̪oːsaɪ̯]
Telugu: దోసె	dōse	[d̪oːse]
Telugu: అట్టు	aṭṭu	[aʈːu]
Odia: ଚକୁଳି	chàkulī	[t͡ʃ̪ɔkuli]

The Tamil term dōsai lends to thosai as used in Malaysian English and Singapore English mentioned above.

== Nutrition ==
Dosa is high in carbohydrates and contains no added sugars. As its key ingredients are rice and black gram, it is a good source of protein. A typical homemade plain dosa without oil contains about 112 calories, of which 84% is carbohydrate and 16% is protein. The fermentation process increases the vitamin B and vitamin C content.

== Preparation ==
A mixture of rice and white gram that has been soaked in water for at least 4 to 5 hours is ground finely to form a batter. Some add a bit of soaked fenugreek seeds while grinding the batter. The proportion of rice to lentils is generally 3:1 or 4:1. After adding salt, the batter is allowed to ferment overnight, before being mixed with water to get the desired consistency. The batter is then ladled onto a hot tava or griddle greased with oil or ghee. It is spread out with the base of a ladle or a bowl to form a pancake. It can be made either thick like a pancake, or thin and crispy. A dosa is served hot, either folded in half or rolled like a wrap. It is usually served with chutney and sambar. The mixture of white grams and rice can be replaced with highly refined wheat flour or semolina.

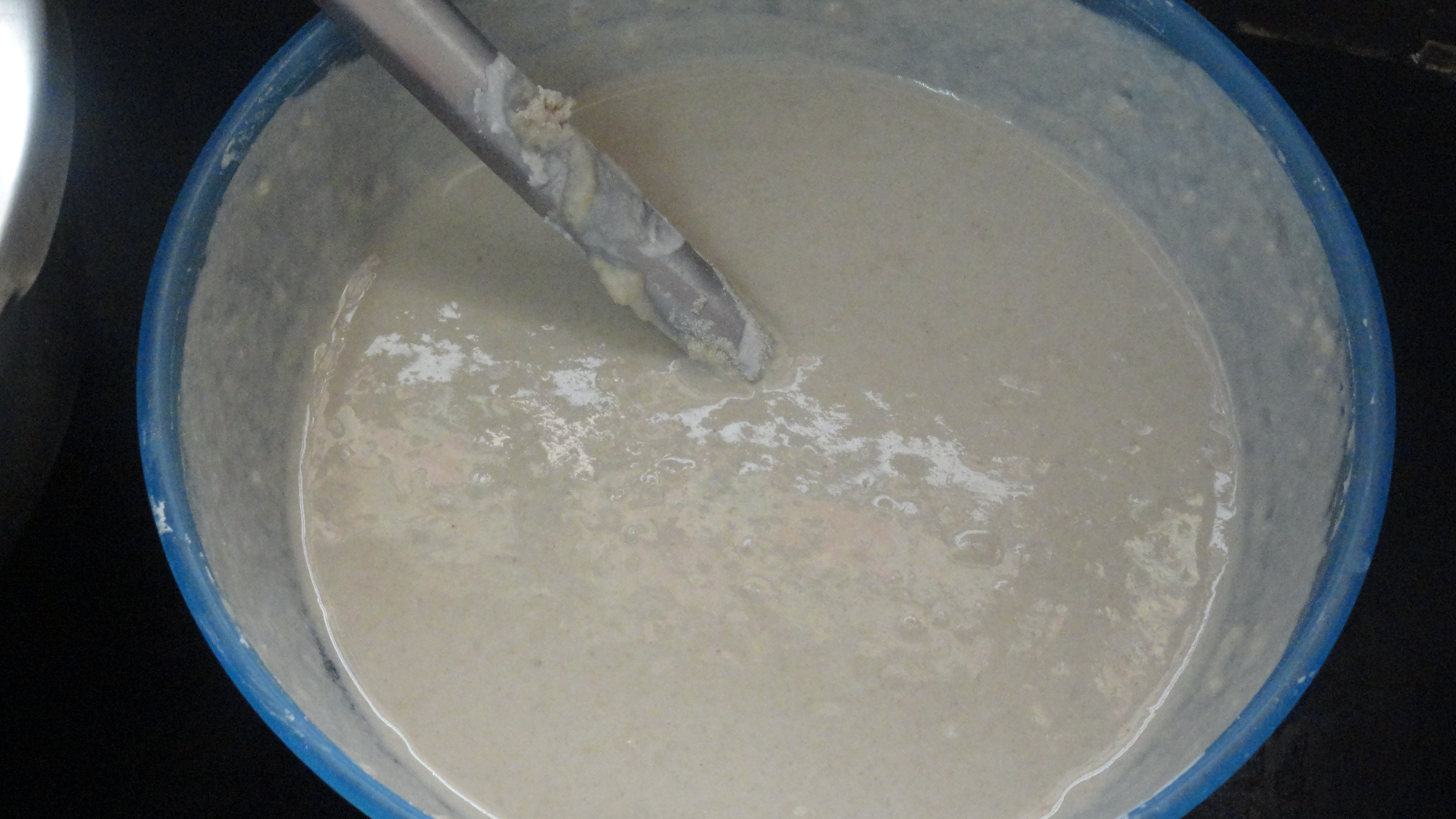
Rice batter

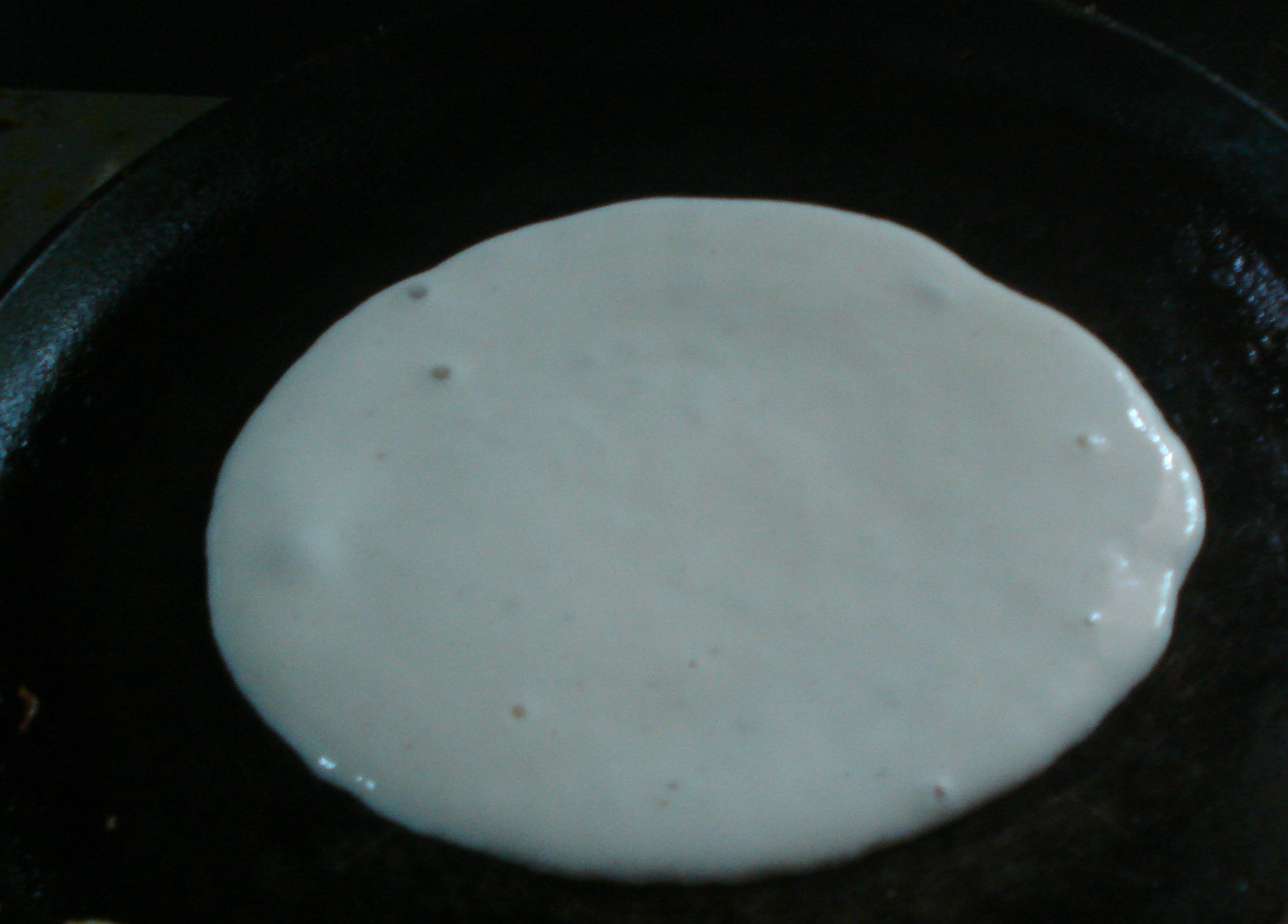
Batter poured on a tava or griddle

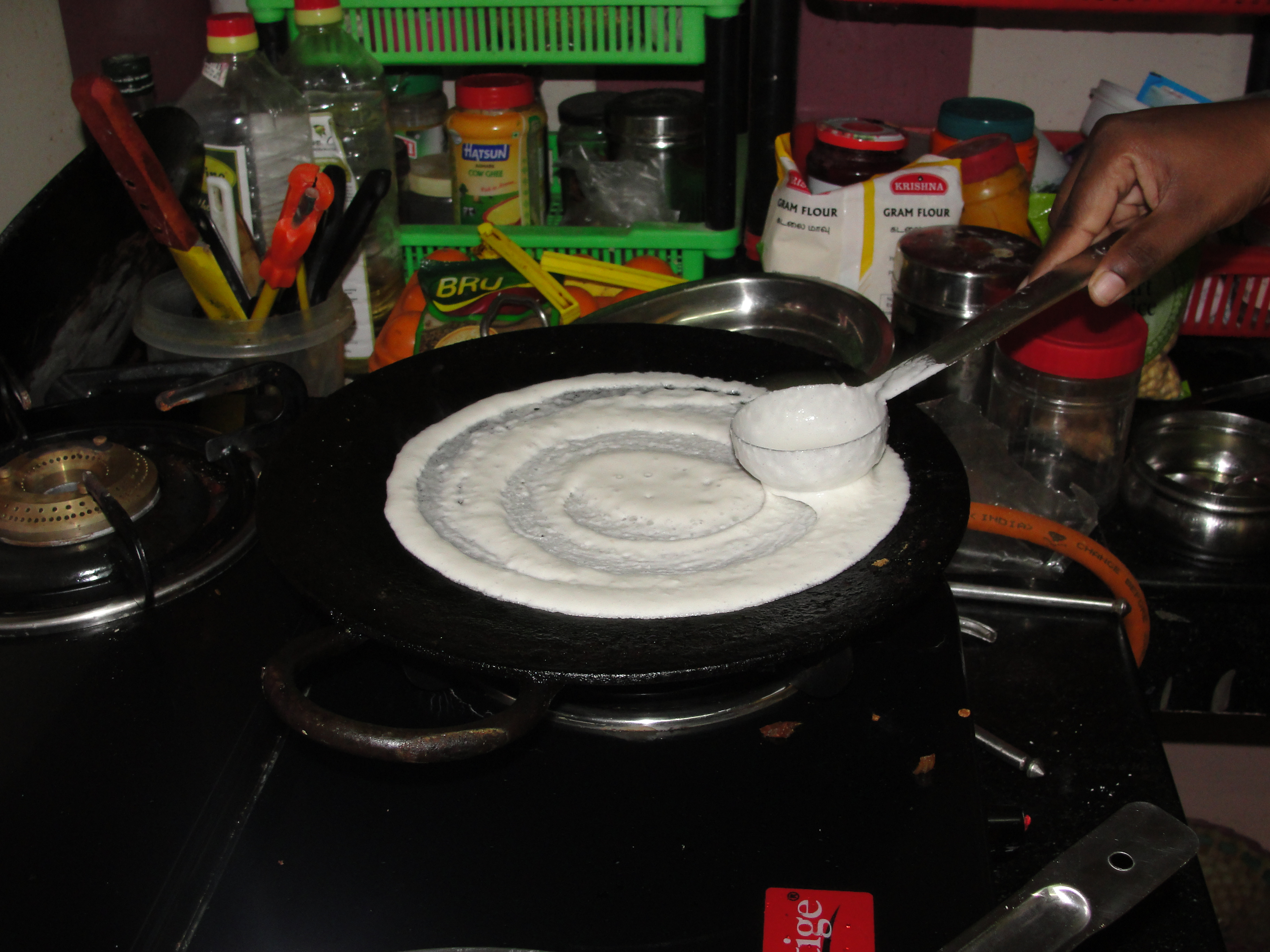
Batter being spread uniformly

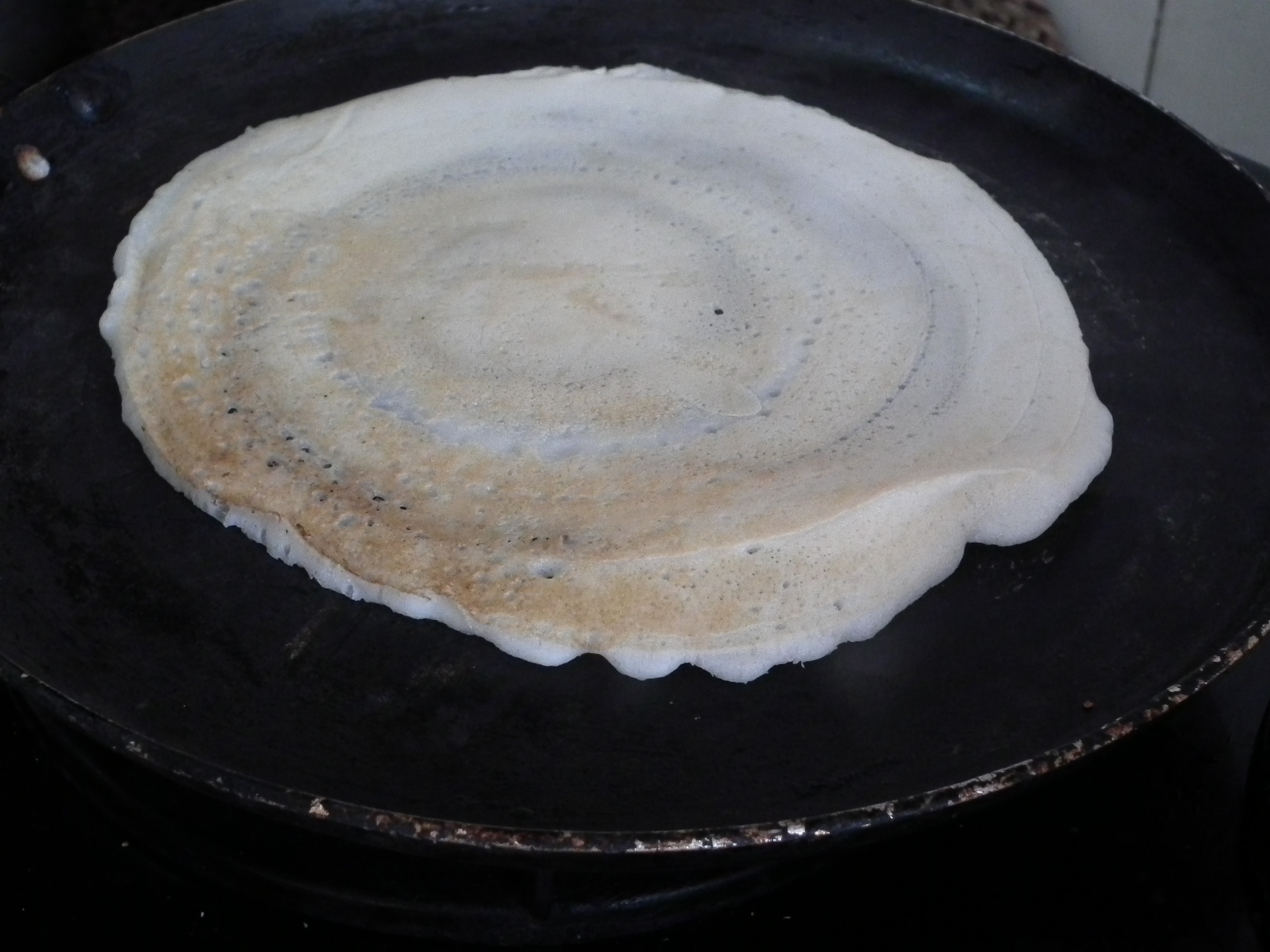
After being cooked for some time

== Serving ==
Dosas can be stuffed with fillings of vegetables and sauces to make a quick meal. They are typically served with a vegetarian side dish, which varies according to regional and personal preferences. Common side items are:

- Sambar
- Chutney
- Idli podi or milagaipodi: A lentil powder with spices and sometimes desiccated coconut, mixed with sesame oil or groundnut oil or ghee
- Indian pickles

== Variations ==
Masala dosa is a roasted dosa served with potato curry, chutney, and sambar, while saada (plain) dosa is prepared with a lighter texture; paper dosa is a thin and crisp version. Rava dosa is made crispier using semolina. Newer versions include Chinese dosa, cheese dosa, paneer dosa, and pizza dosa.

Though dosa is typically made with rice and lentils, other versions exist.

Types of dosa (sorted alphabetically)
Name	Description
Adai dosa	From Tamil Nadu, it is a dosa-like dish prepared from a combination of toor dal, rice, curry leaves, red chillies, and asafoetida. The batter is not fermented, and is usually eaten with jaggery or aviyal.
Amboli, ghavan, dhirde	In coastal parts of Maharashtra, variations known as amboli and ghavan are thin rice crêpes prepared with fermented batter, while dhirde is prepared with unfermented batter.
Benne dose	Made with butter (benne in Kannada), it is predominantly famous as Davanagere benne dose associated with the Davanagere district in Karnataka.
Buttermilk dosa	Semolina, maida, buttermilk
Egg dosa	(Muttai dosai in Tamil) A thicker base of dosa topped with beaten egg, or beaten egg is added to batter before cooking.
Ghee roast	(Nei dosai in Tamil) Plain dosa cooked with ghee instead of oil and usually with no filling
Jaggery dosa	Rice flour, maida, grated coconut, jaggery.
Jini dosa	A variety from Mumbai; a crispy, cheesy dosa stuffed with a spicy mix of vegetables such as cabbage, carrots, and capsicum in addition to a tangy sauce.
Kadapa Neyyi karam dosa	Rice flour fermented overnight and mixed with sodium carbonate. The topping is a mixture of onion and chili paste (called yerra karam) and a chutney made with tomato and flour made in a gravy of curd. It is roasted in Ghee. It is also occasionally topped with fried gram powder.
Kal dosai	A thicker, softer, and spongier variant of a plain dosa, it also uses a stone tawa instead of the regular iron tawa for other dosas.
Kari dosai	A Tamil Nadu specialty with a dosa of thicker base topped with cooked meat, usually chicken or mutton: Dosas topped with vegetables or vegetable curry are also sometimes referred to as kari dosai.
Light white dosa	Rice and coconut
Madurai kari dosai	A famous variant of kari dosai is the Madurai kari dosai. This has a vegetarian and a non-vegetarian variant. The latter consists of non-vegetarian toppings of a mix of omelette, minced meat, and without vegetables, while the former has a fully vegetarian topping of vegetable curry.
Maida dosa	The maida dosa batter is made from maida (refined flour) by adding water to get dense consistency; chopped onion, chilli, coriander leaves, and salt are added for taste. Maida dosa is quickly made in many households of Karnataka state, India.
Masala dosa	Roasted and crispy dosa, served with potato curry, chutney and sambar
Mini soya dosa	Soya milk and wheat flour
Minapattu	Very similar to plain dosa, this version tends to be thicker and, compared to plain dosa, it has a greater ratio of urad dal to rice flour or, in some cases, idli rava.
Neer dosa	Made with a watery rice batter
Onion rava dosa	Semolina, rice flour, onion
Oats dosa	Healthy, crisp and lacy instant dosa made with oats
Palak dosa	Layered with palak (spinach) paste inside the folds of dosa
Paneer dosa	Spiced, flavorful paneer filling inside the dosa
Paper roast/Plain roast dosa	A large, plain dosa known for its thin layer and crispiness resulting from making a very thin layer of batter and the addition of extra oil compared to plain dosa
Pesarattu (green dosa)	Made with green gram. It is served with Allam Pachadi. (Ginger chutney)
Plain dosa	Dosa has light texture and can be crispy.
Pizza dosa	A fusion of the traditional dosa and a regular pizza, it comes in many subvariants. It primarily uses toppings that resemble those of a regular pizza.
Pori dosa/Puffed rice dosa	Uses some puffed rice alongside raw rice and some lentils in the batter
Ragi wheat dosa	Ragi, whole wheat flour
Rava dosa	Made with rava or sooji (semolina), it is a healthier alternative to regular dosa. Rava dosa takes up more oil than a regular dosa and can stick to the tawa if enough oil is not used. It also takes more time to prepare than a regular dosa.
Red rice dosa	A healthier variant of the regular dosa, it uses red rice instead of white rice, though the batter may also involve a mixture of the two rice varieties, too.
Schezwan dosa	A type of dosa with stuffing of a mix of cooked vegetables and Schezwan sauce
Set dosa	Smaller, spongy, soft and light, served in a set of 2-3 dosa per serving
Spring roll dosa	A fusion of the traditional plain dosa and the spring roll, it has vegetarian and non-vegetarian variants. It uses the same stuffing as in the spring roll and is usually cut and served rolled up as a spring roll. It is also notably spicy.
Tandoori dosa	A variety of dosa that uses a tandoor to prepare it instead of a tawa
Uttapam	This variety of dosa is much thicker and softer and served with vegetable toppings. It also uses less oil, hence is considered healthier than the typical dosa. It takes more time to prepare than a regular dosa. Both surfaces may be baked. They are eaten like a regular dosa with servings of sambhar and chutney. Its history is as old as the dosa, featuring in Sangam literature. It is closely related to both the dosa and the appam.
Vodu dose or Kappa roti	Vodu dose or kappa roti is made from unfermented rice, fenugreek, grated coconut, thinly flattened rice, and sometimes leftover cooked rice. It is cooked on an earthen pan with a rounded bottom. It is fluffy and appears like a bread. It is cooked without the use of oil.
Wheat dosa	Dosa made with wheat flour batter; a typical wheat dosa may consume more oil and takes longer to prepare than a regular dosa. Instead of oil, ghee or butter may be used.

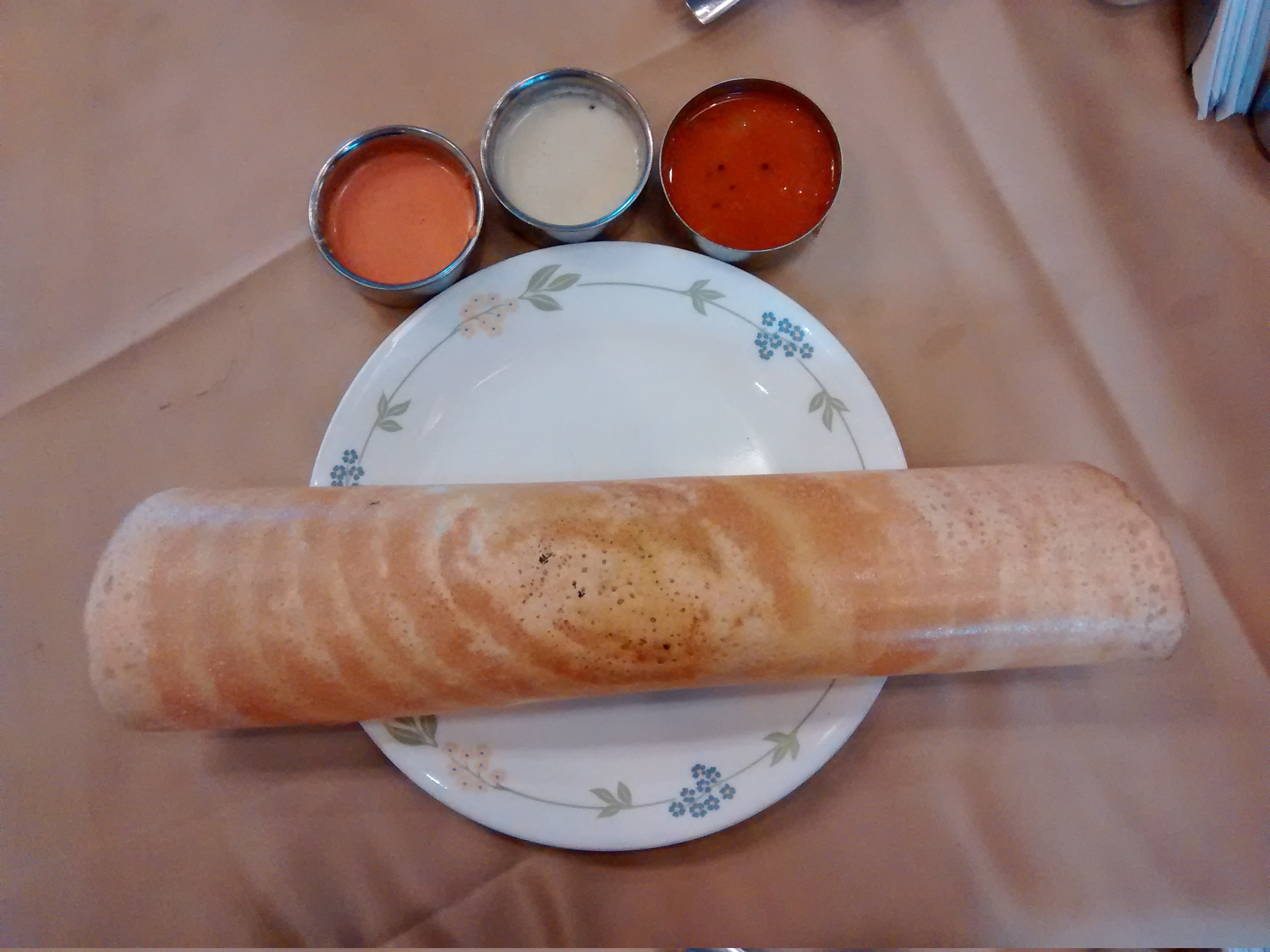
Masala dosa served traditionally with chutney, sambar, sauteed potato filling

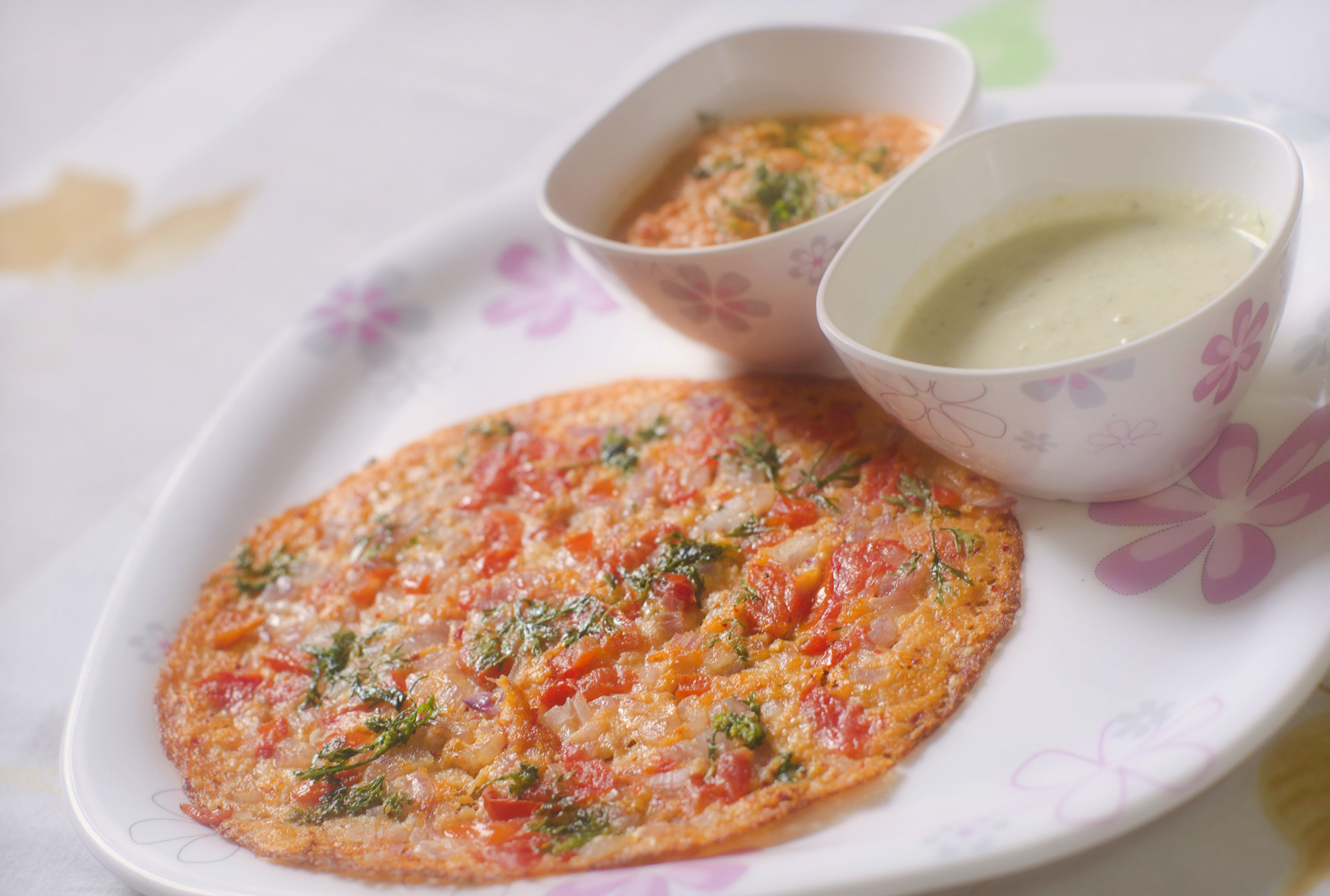
Uttapam is one of the many varieties of dosa prepared in India and served for breakfast.

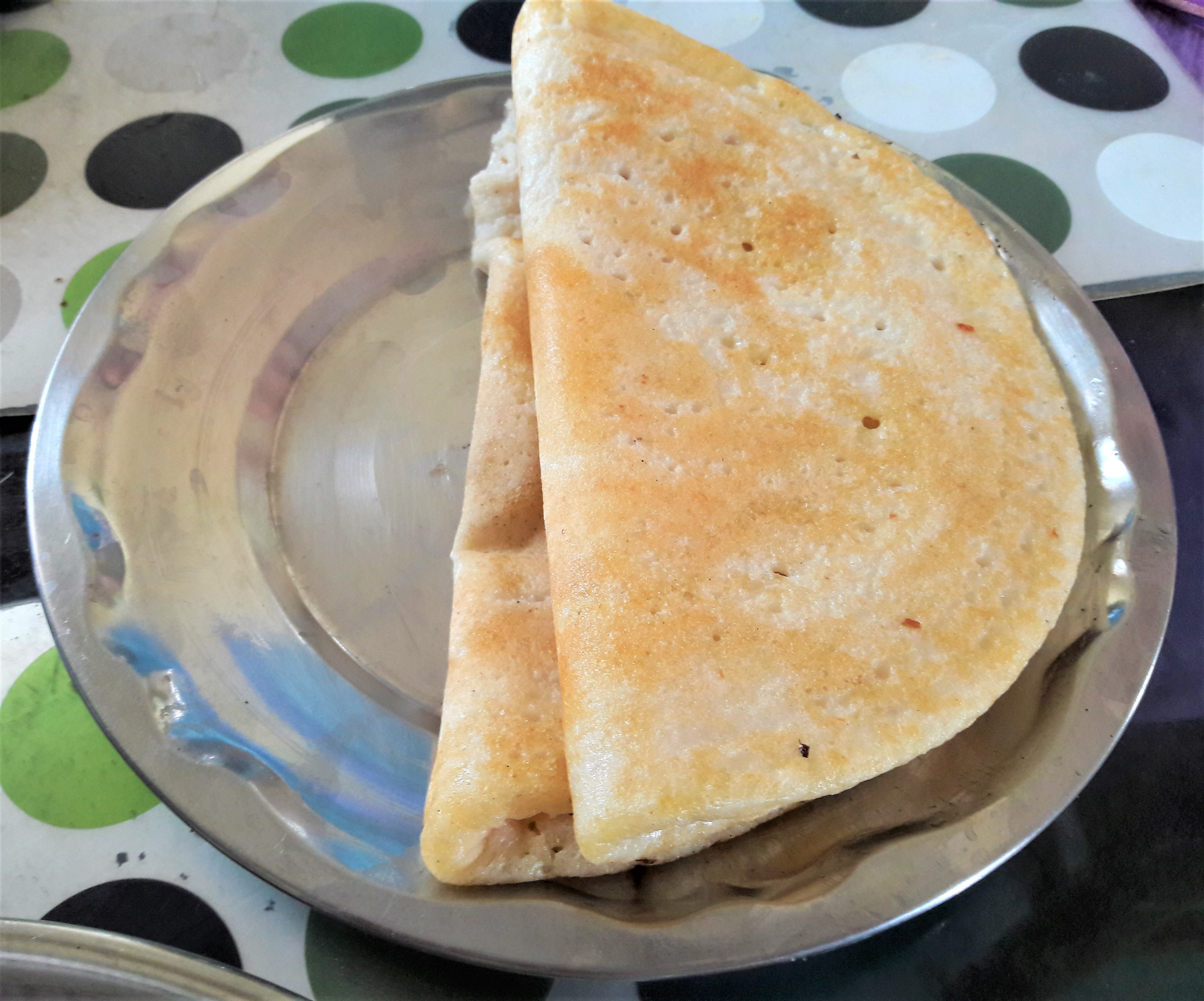
Urad plain dosa

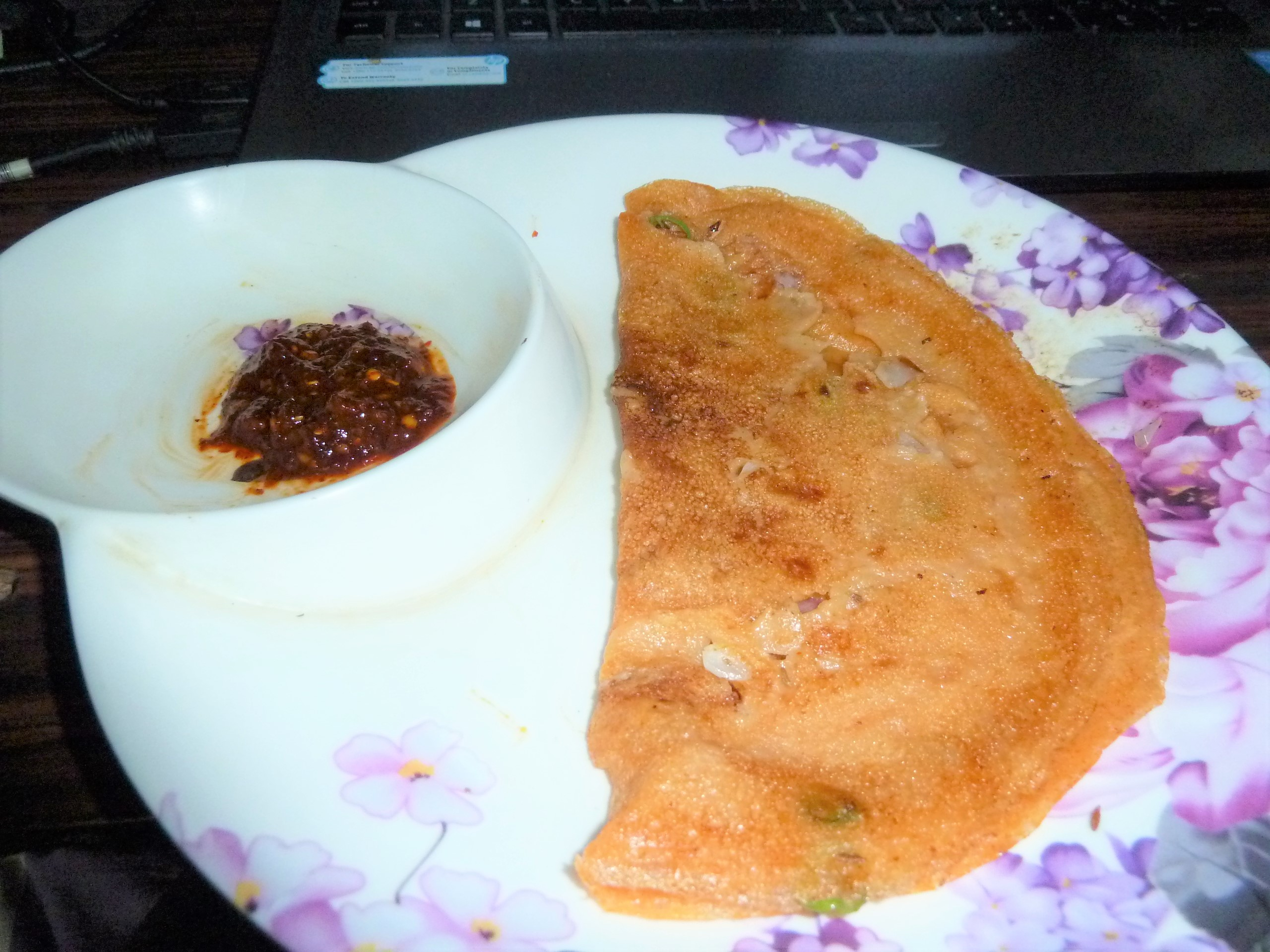
Wheat flour dosa

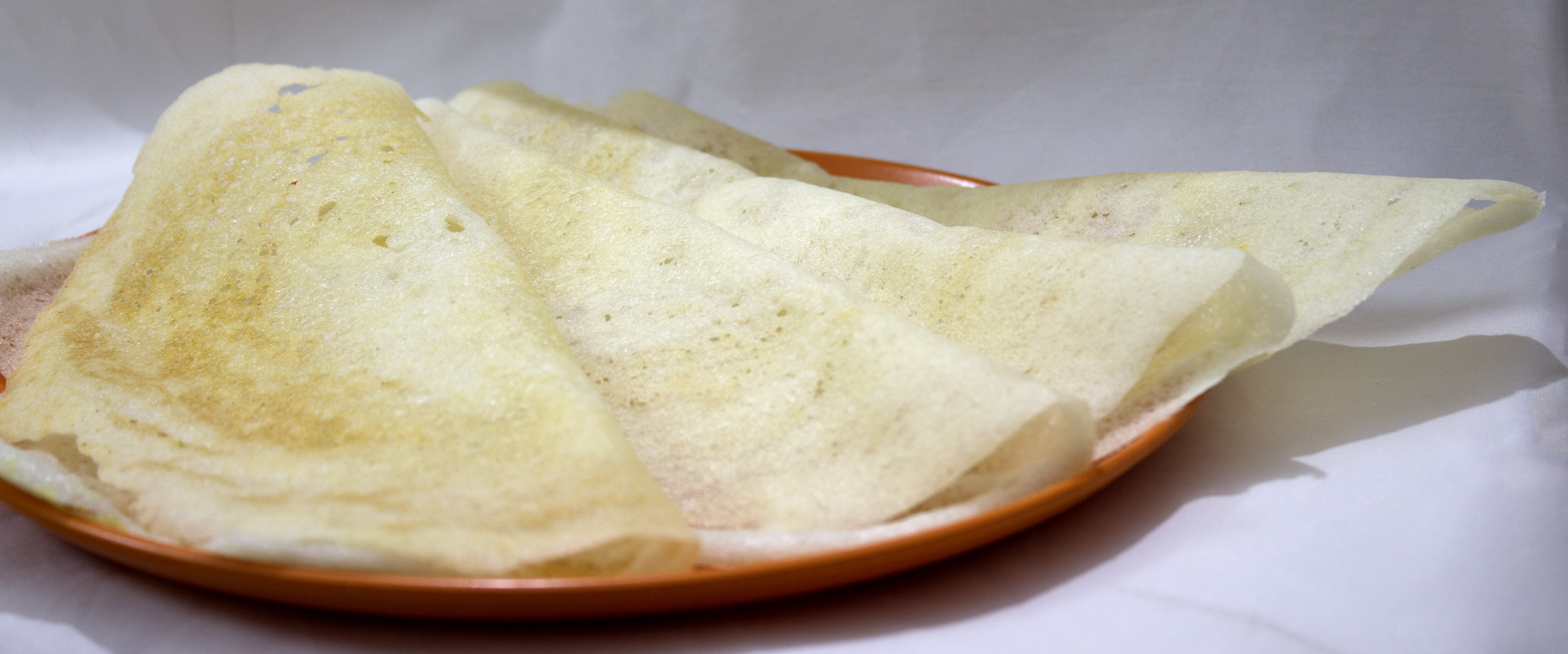
Plain dosa

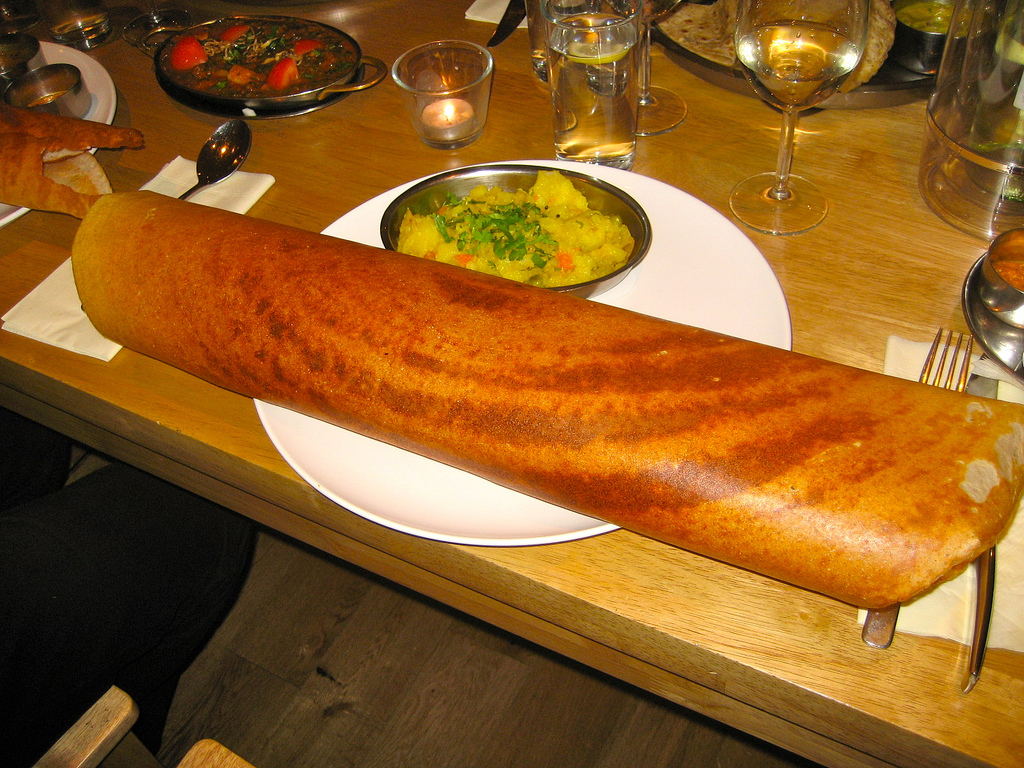
Paper roast, a wafer-thin crispy dosa, served in restaurants

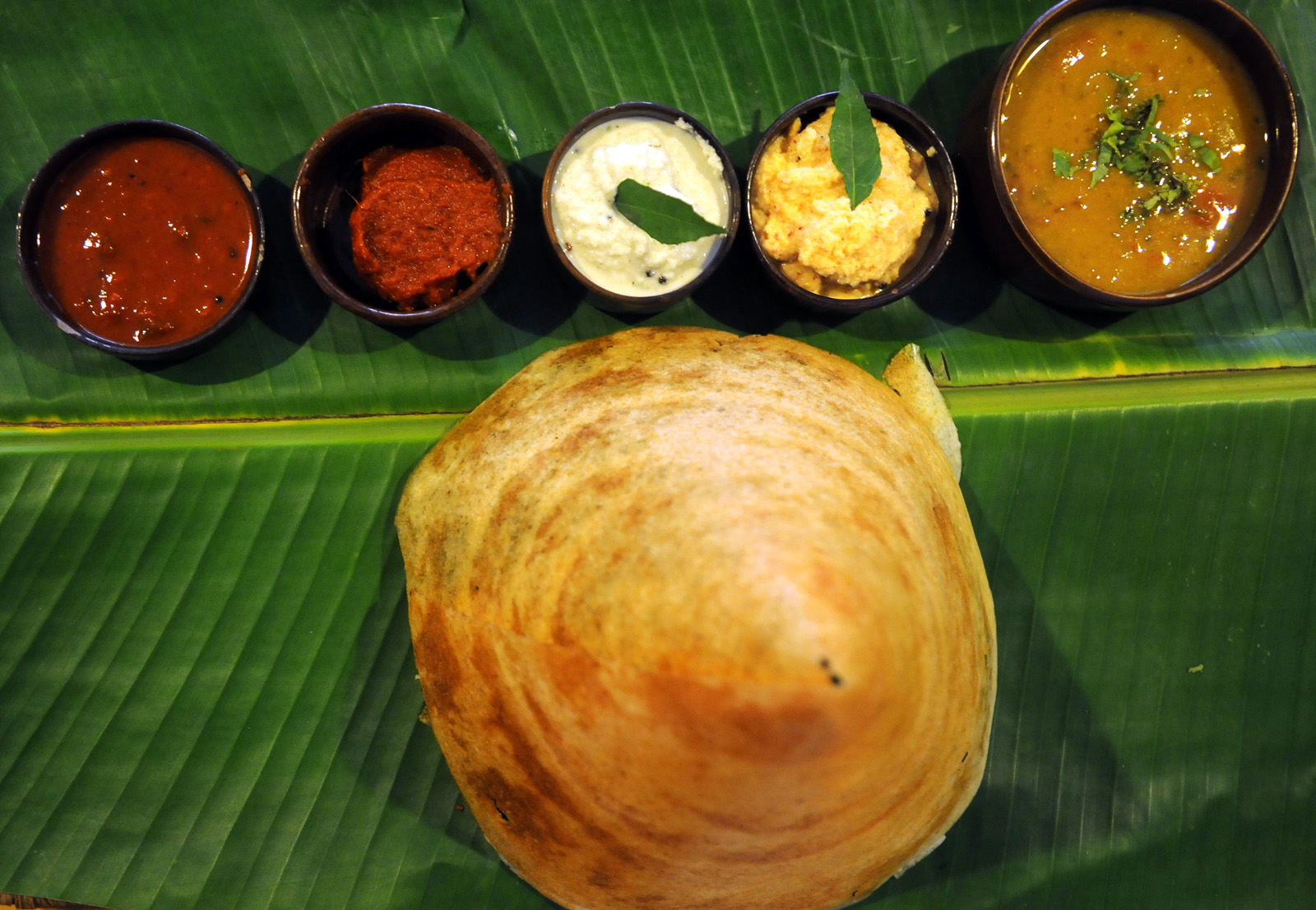
Ghee roast, known as nei dosa in Tamil

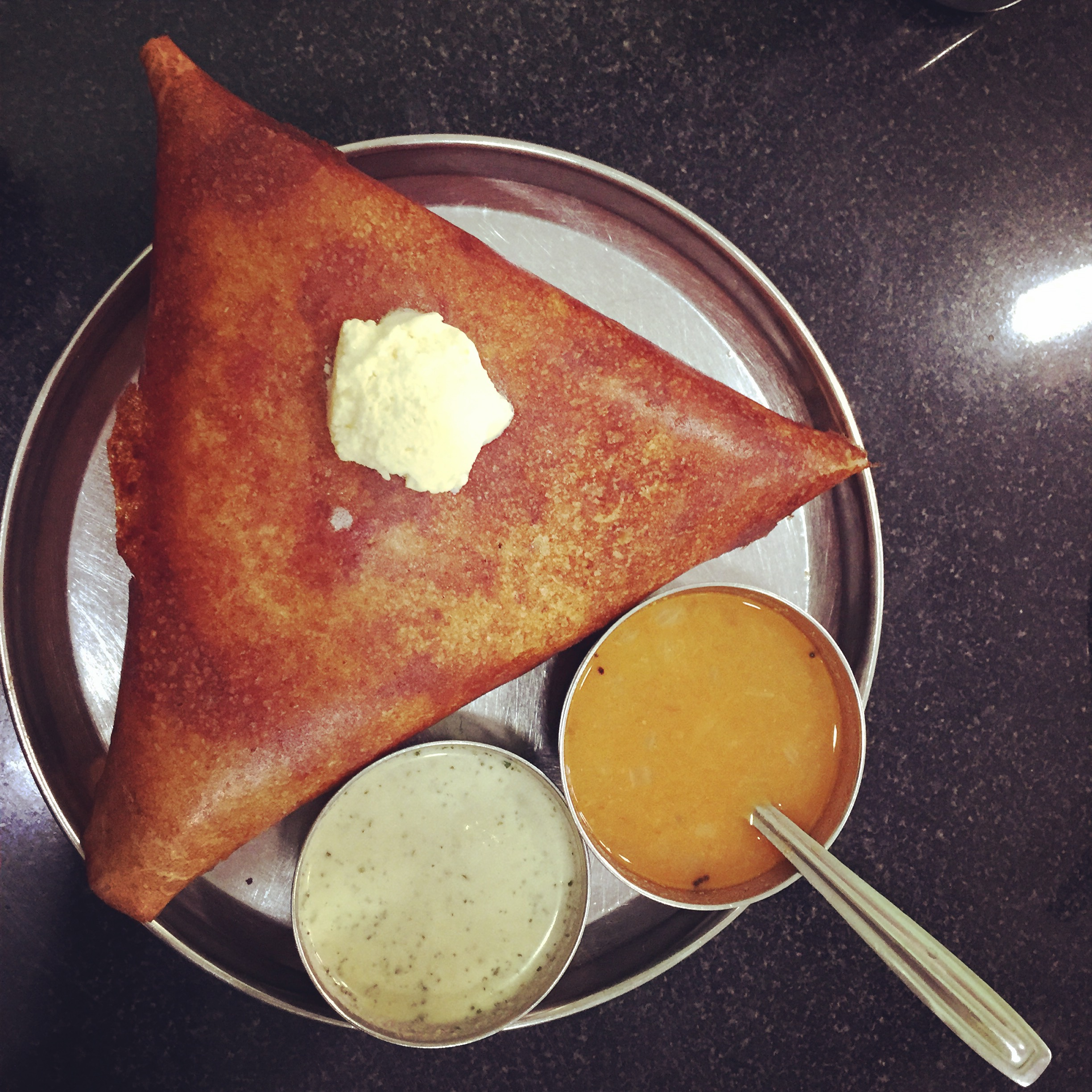
Butter dosa, known as benne dose in Kannada

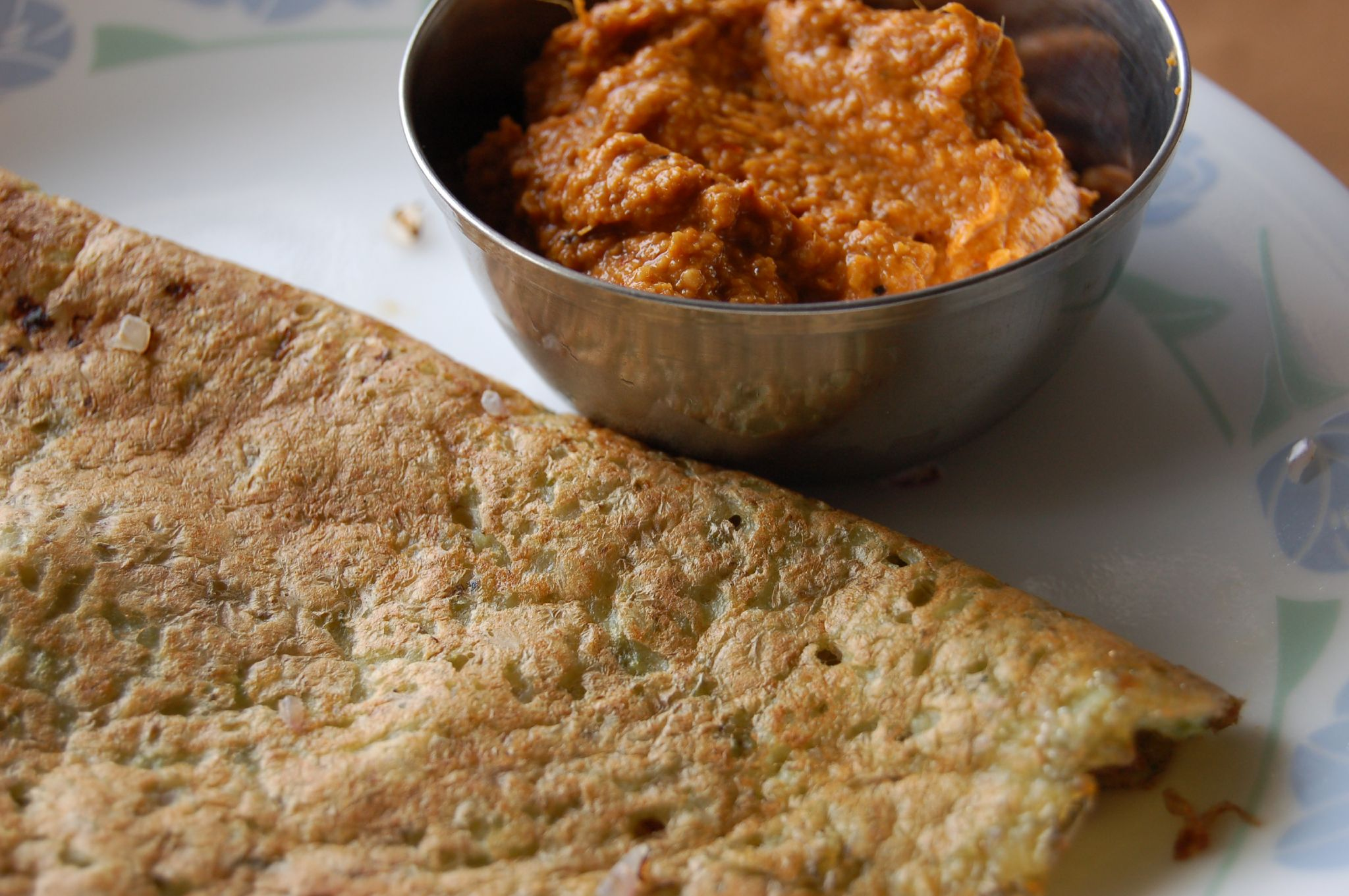
Pesarattu (moong dal dosa) and ginger chutney in Andhra Pradesh

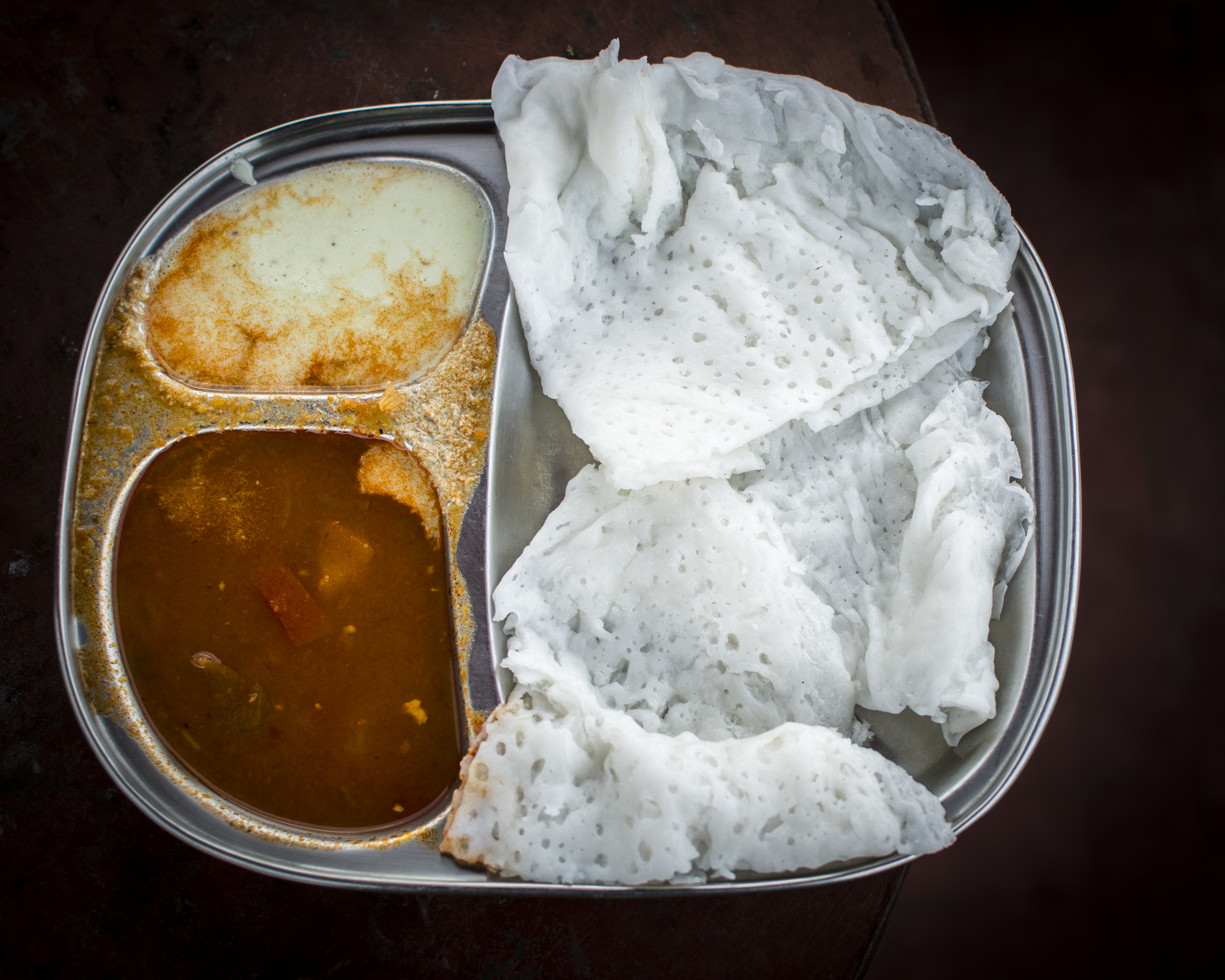
Mangalorian neer dosa popular in South Canara districts, Karnataka

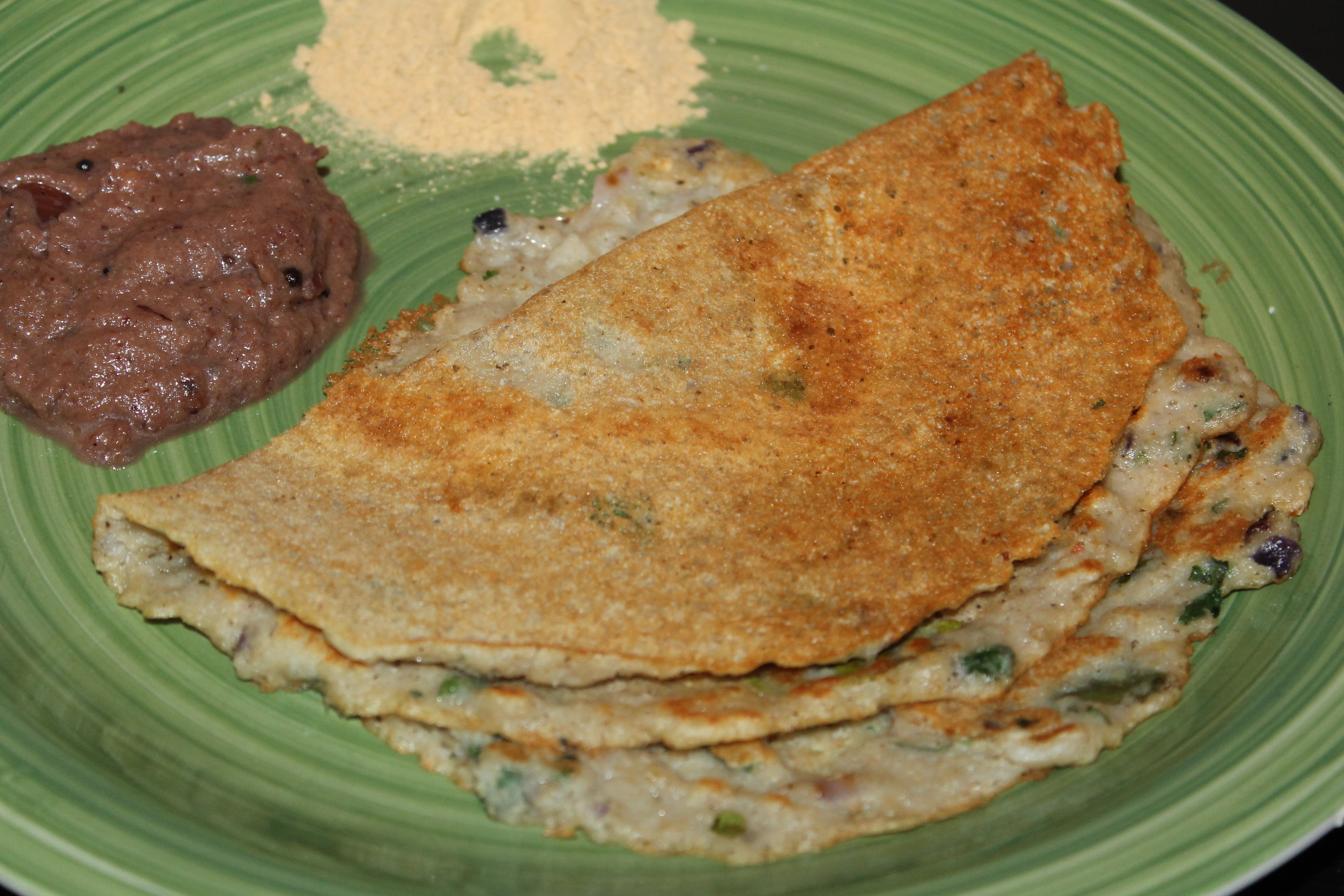
Kambu (bajra/pearl millet) dosa

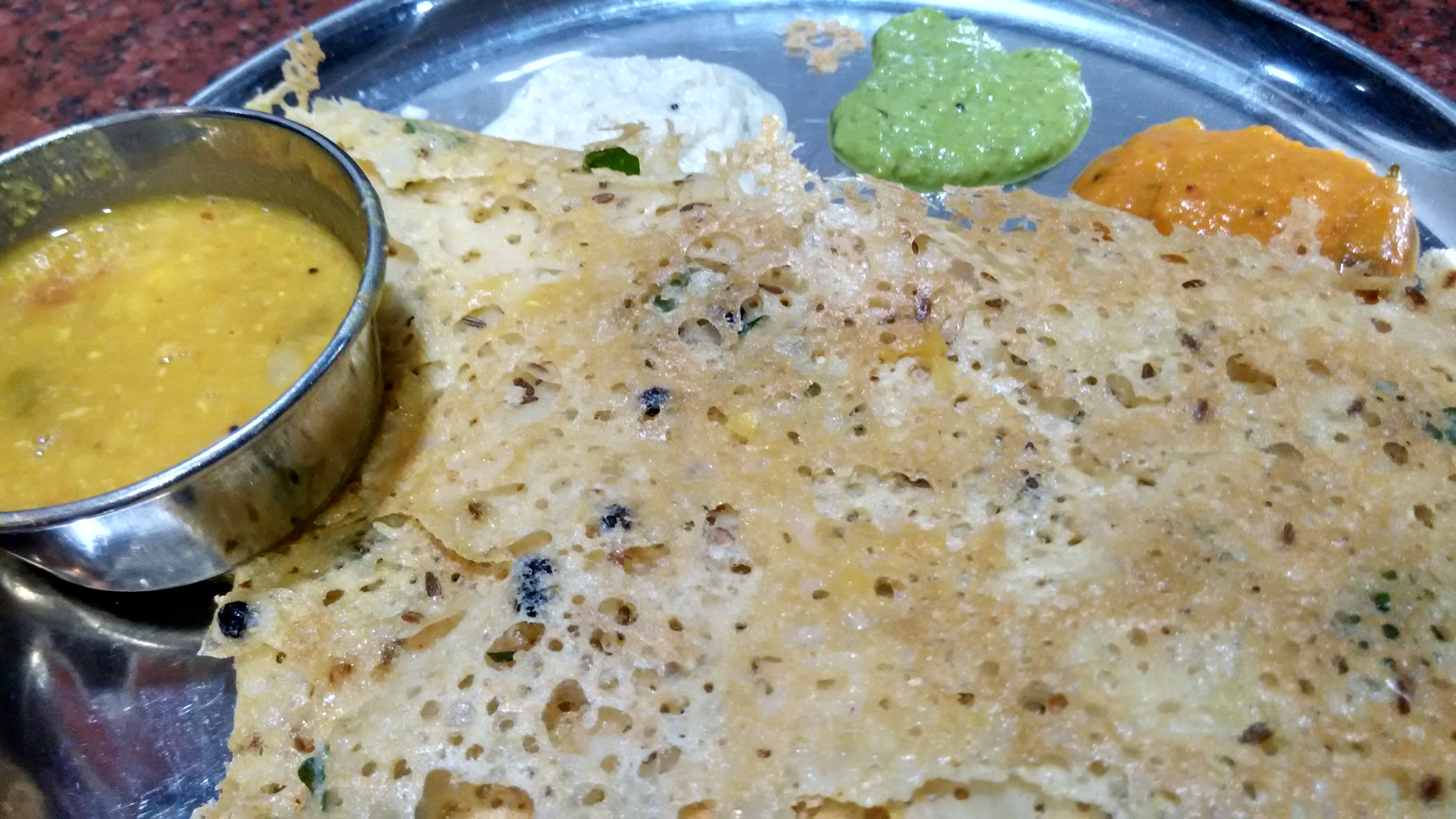
Rava dosa made from sooji rava flour, more popular in Karnataka and Udupi restaurants in Mumbai

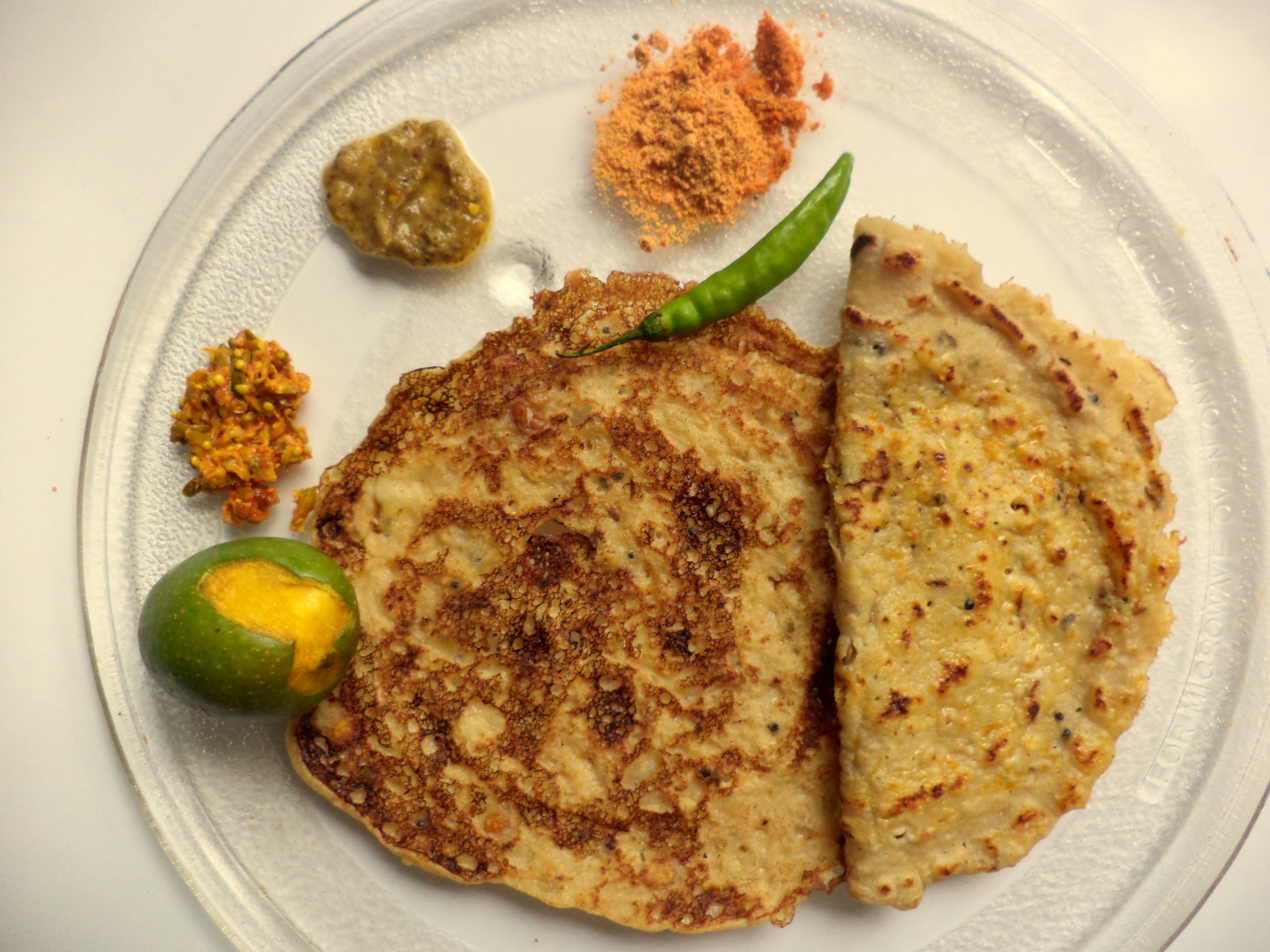
Wheat batter dosa, known locally as godi mau or godhumai mavvu dosa

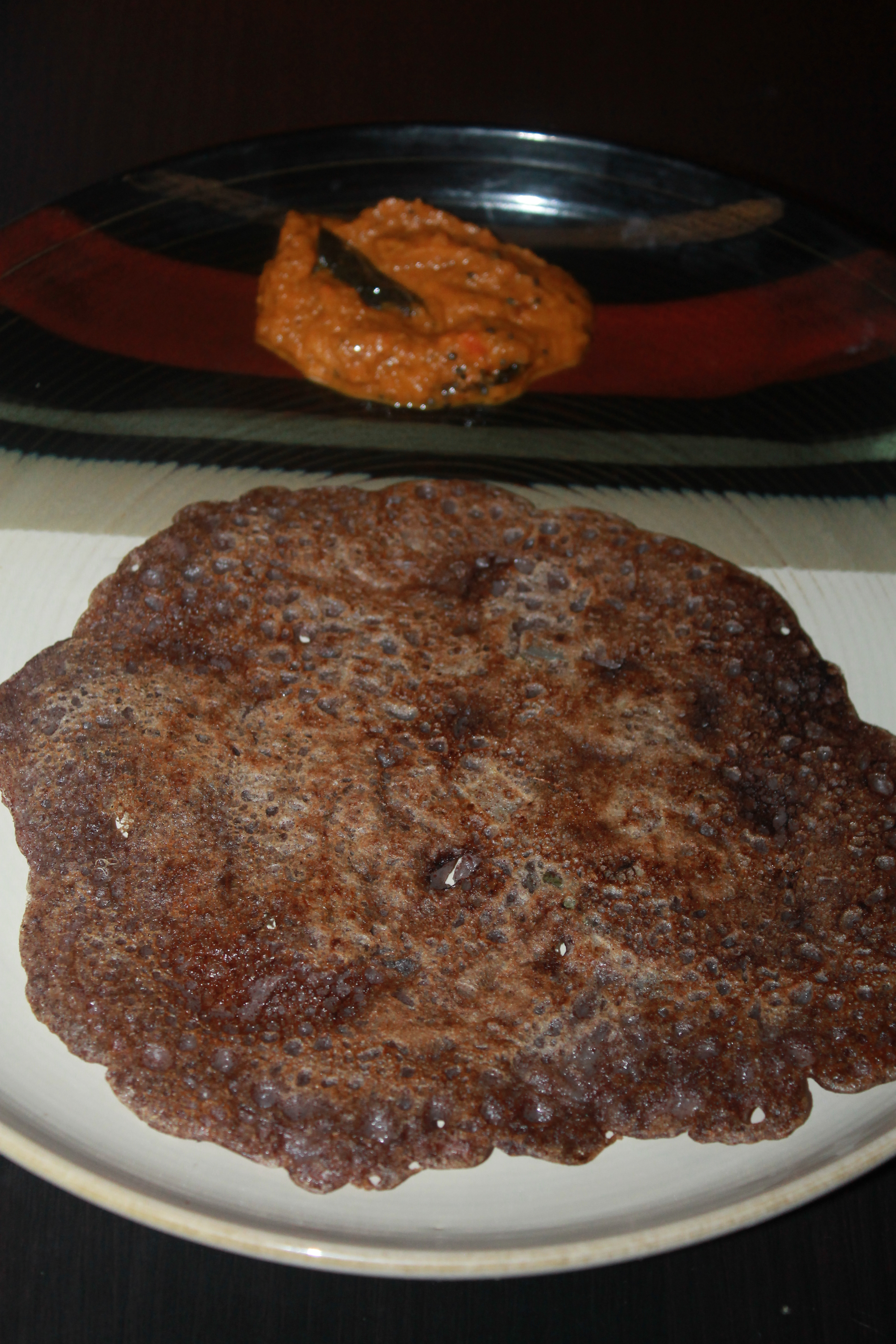
Ragi dosa made of ragi flour mixed with small portions of rice and urad dal

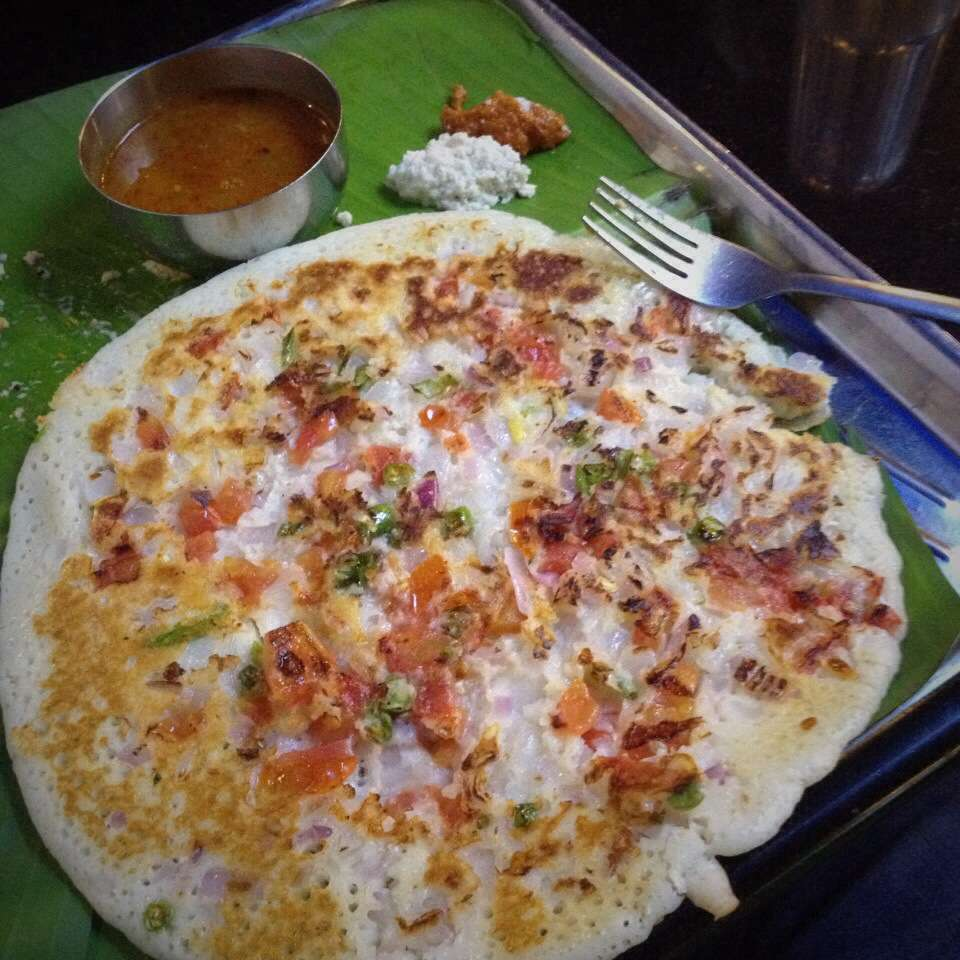
Uthappam or utthapa, a version with onion, chilli, and tomato

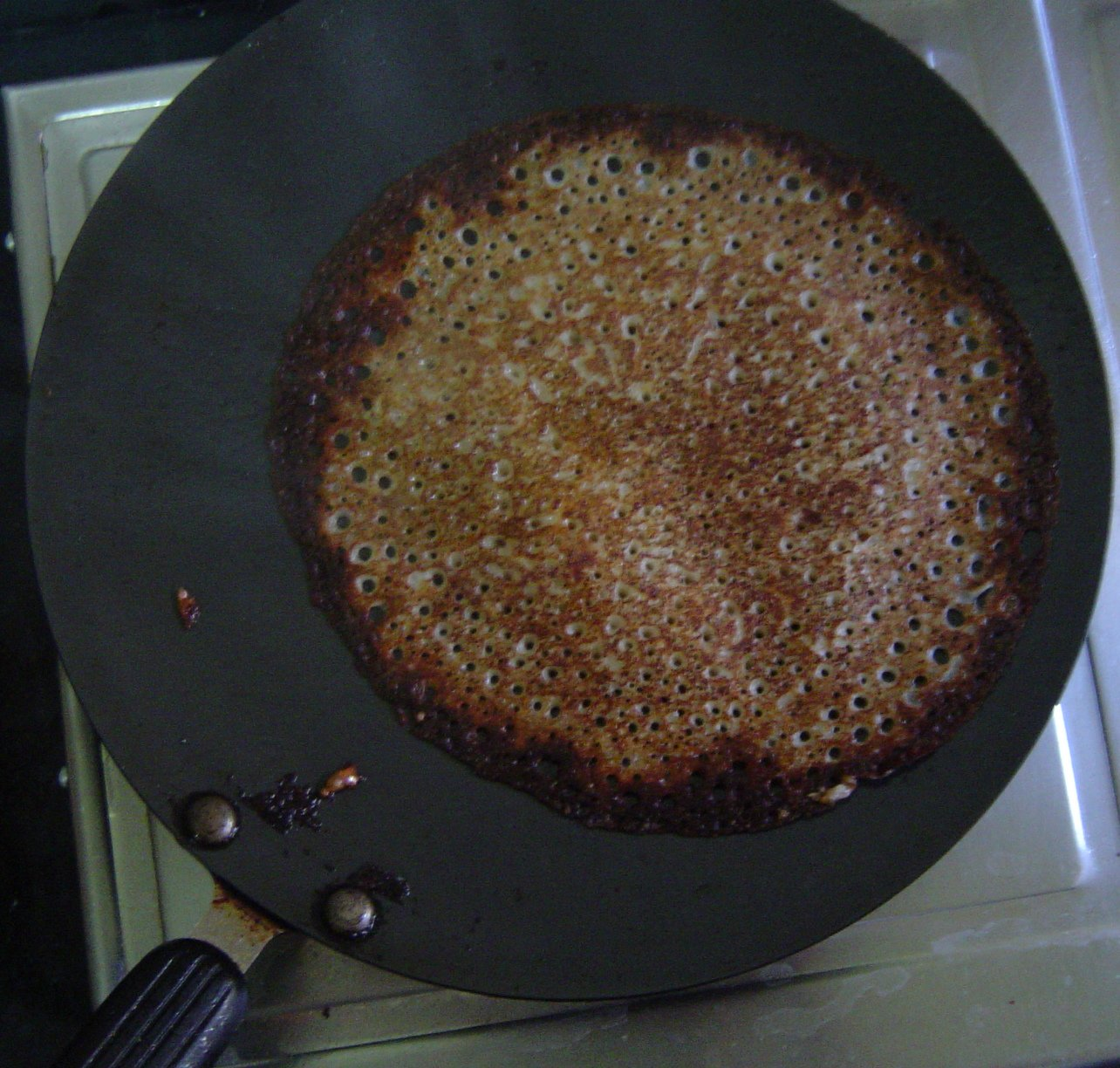
Methi dosa on a pan, known as vendhyam dosai in Tamil Nadu

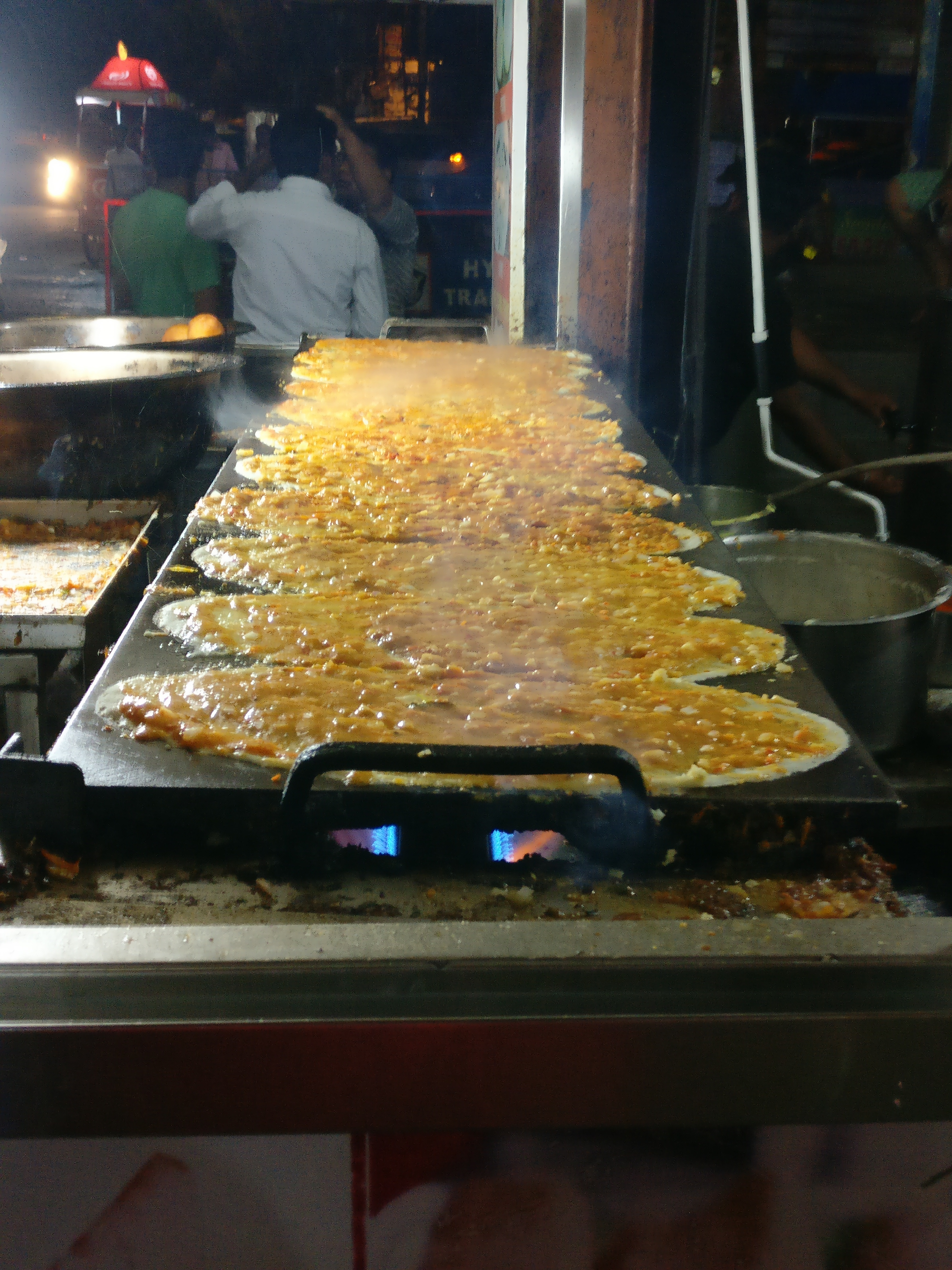
Masala dosa at a street food center

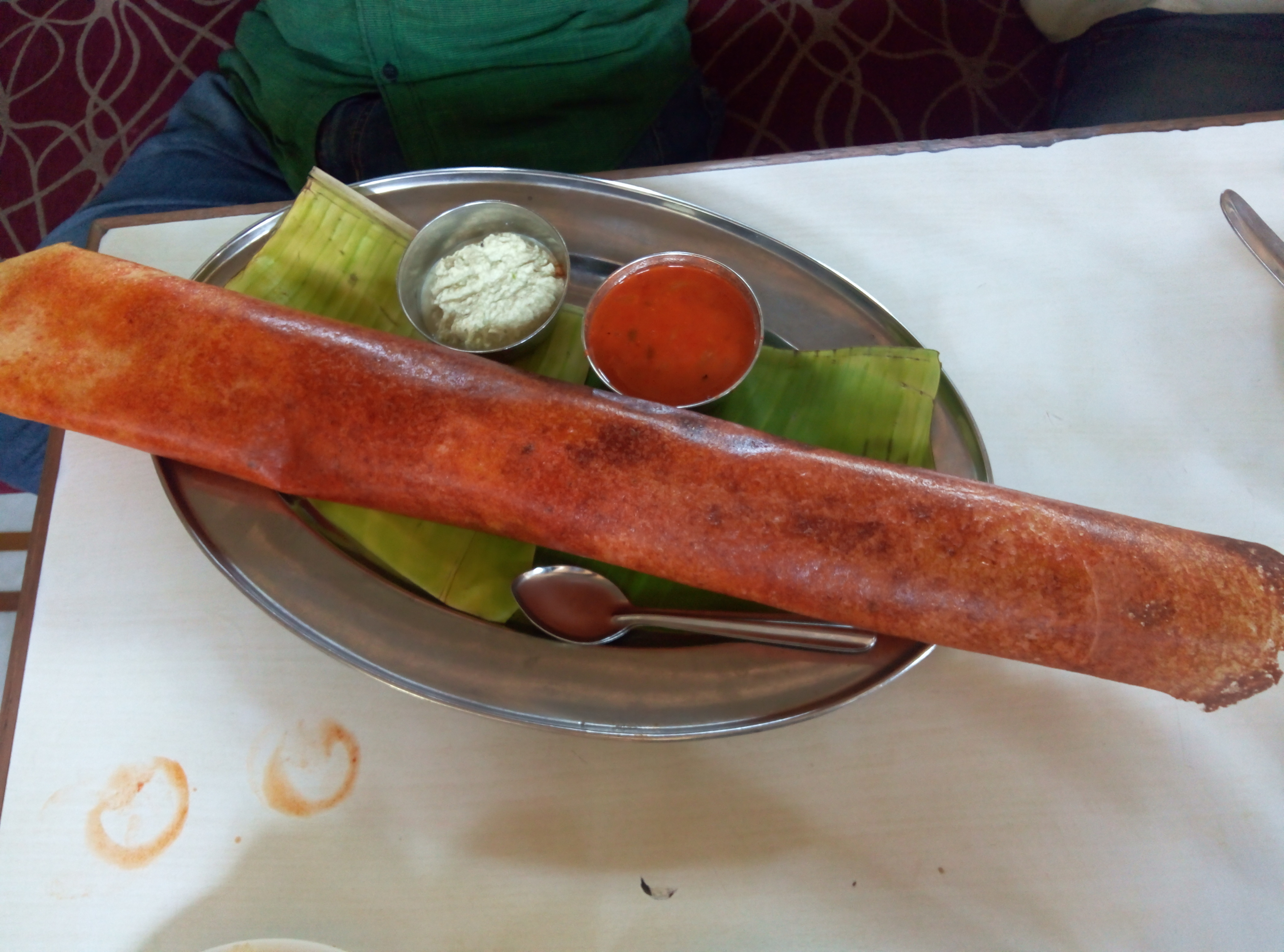
"Table dosa" which covers almost half of the table

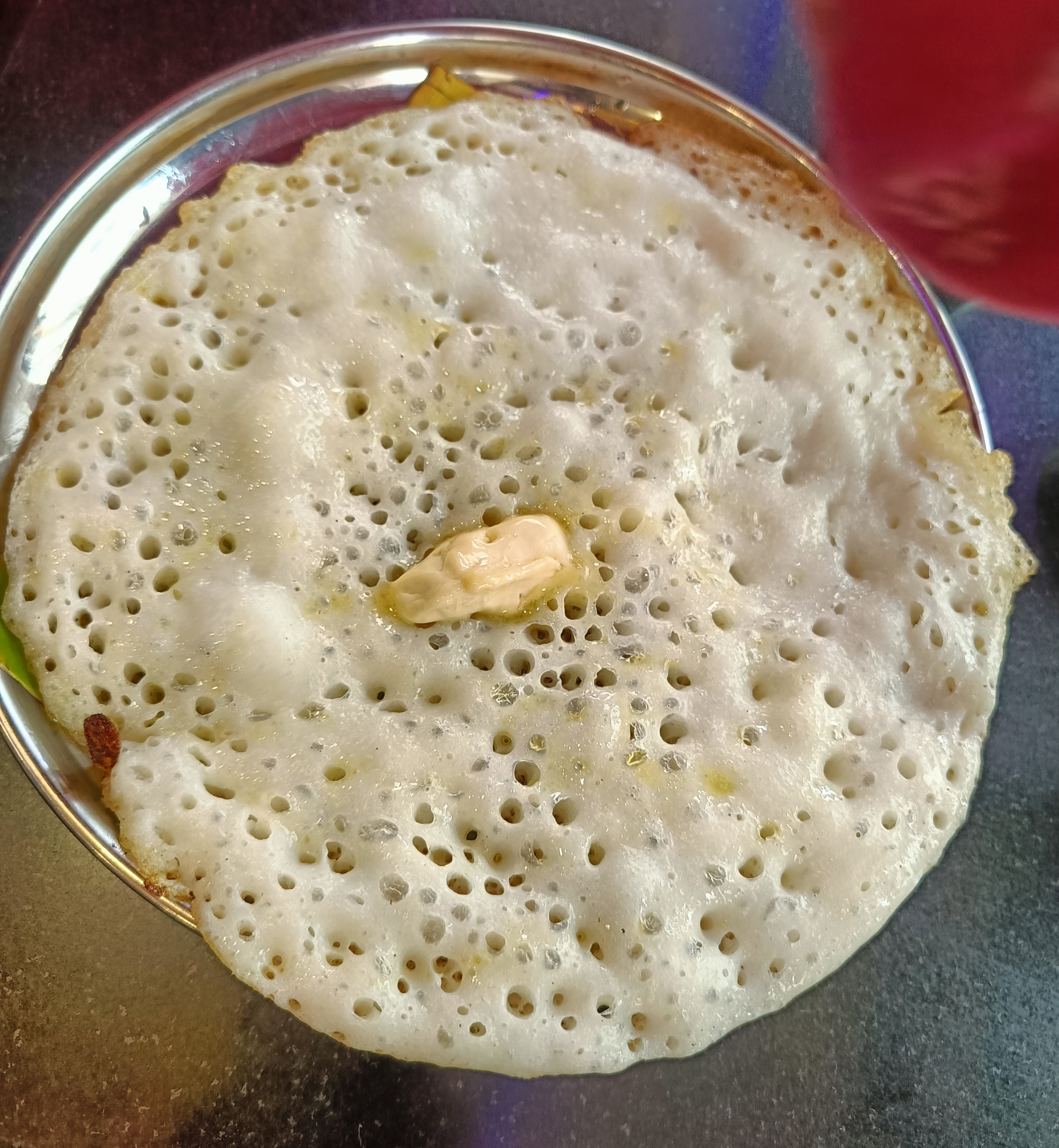
Mysore Mallige Dosey

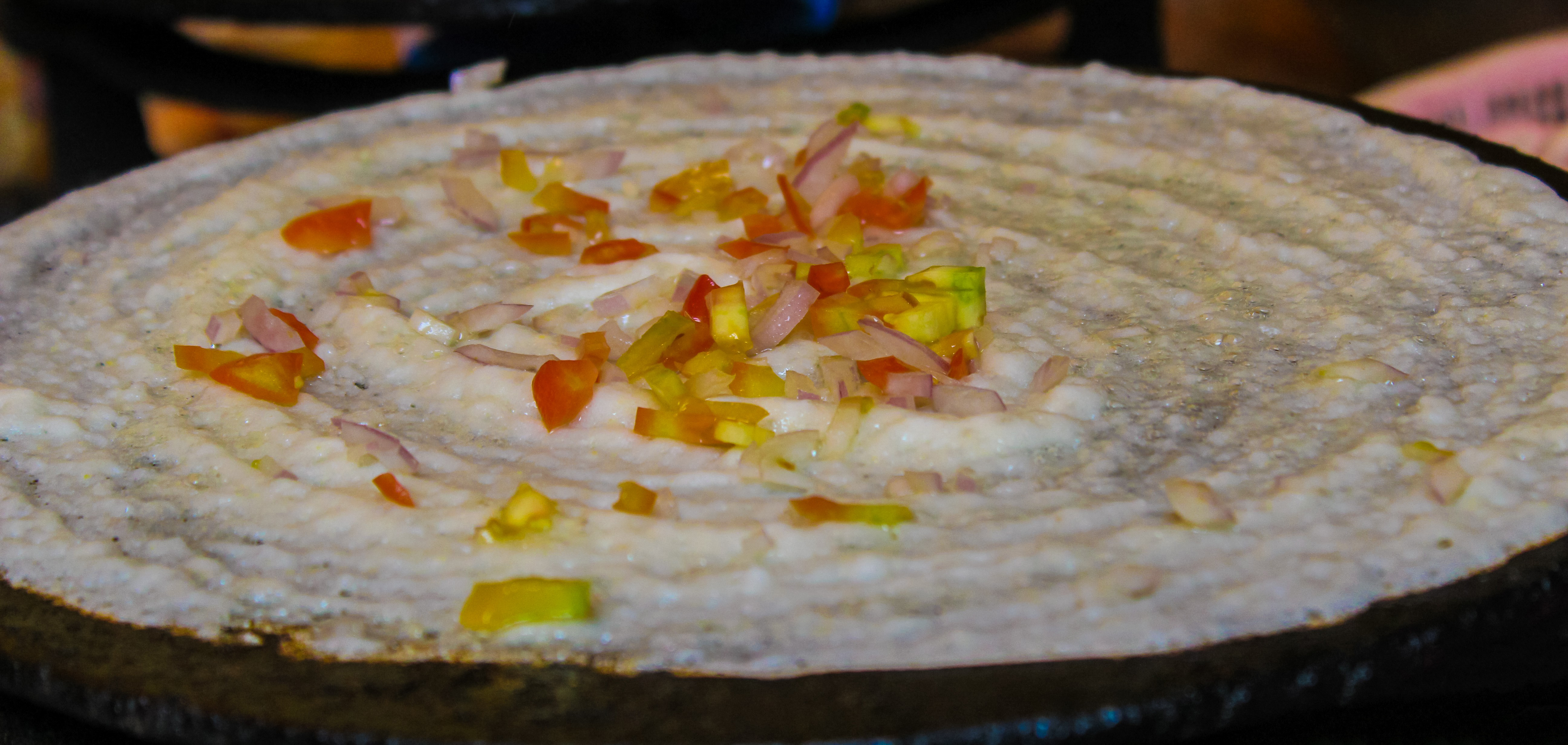
Indian street dosa masala in Varanasi, India

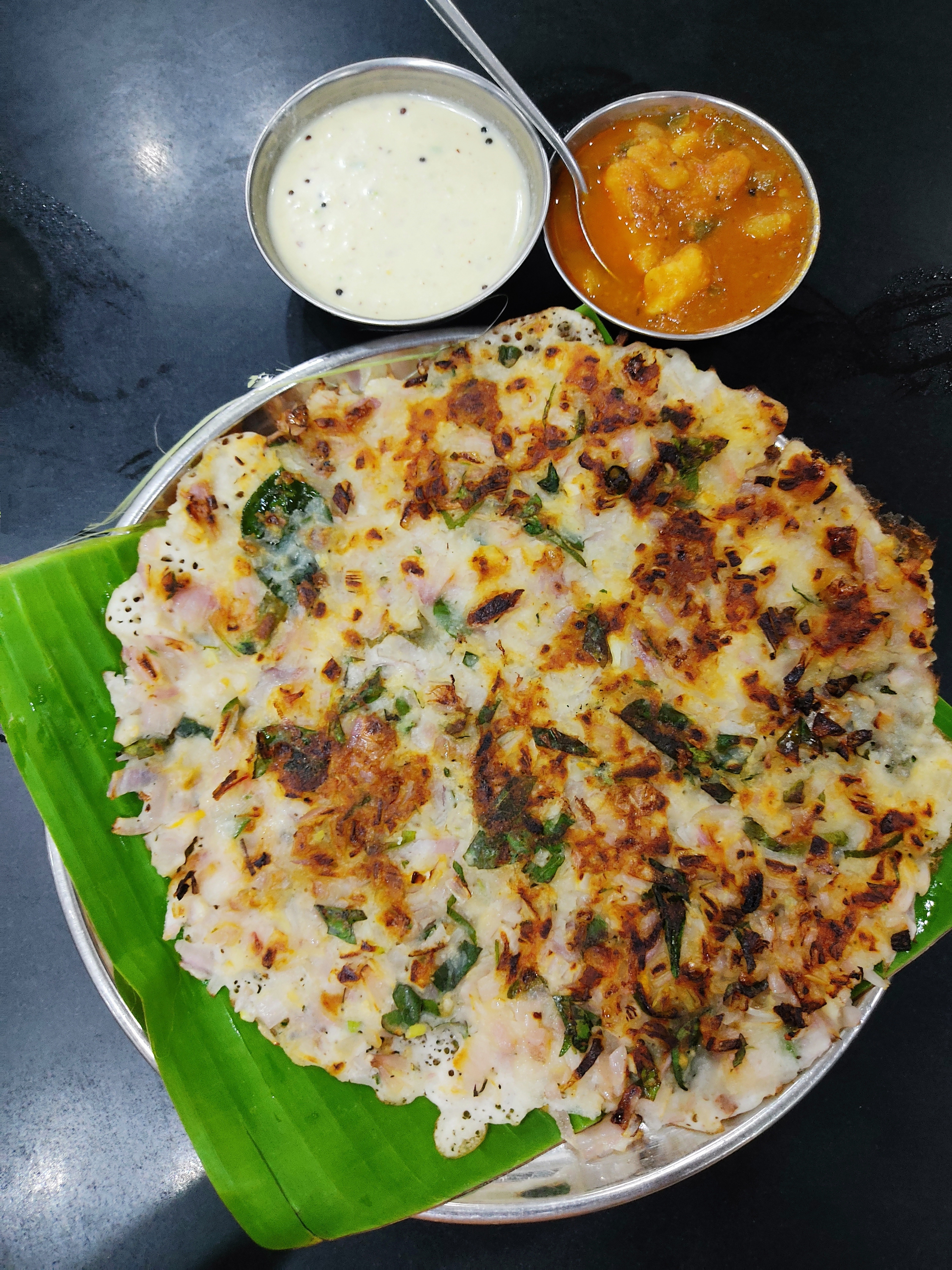
Onion dosa, with coconut chutney and potato curry

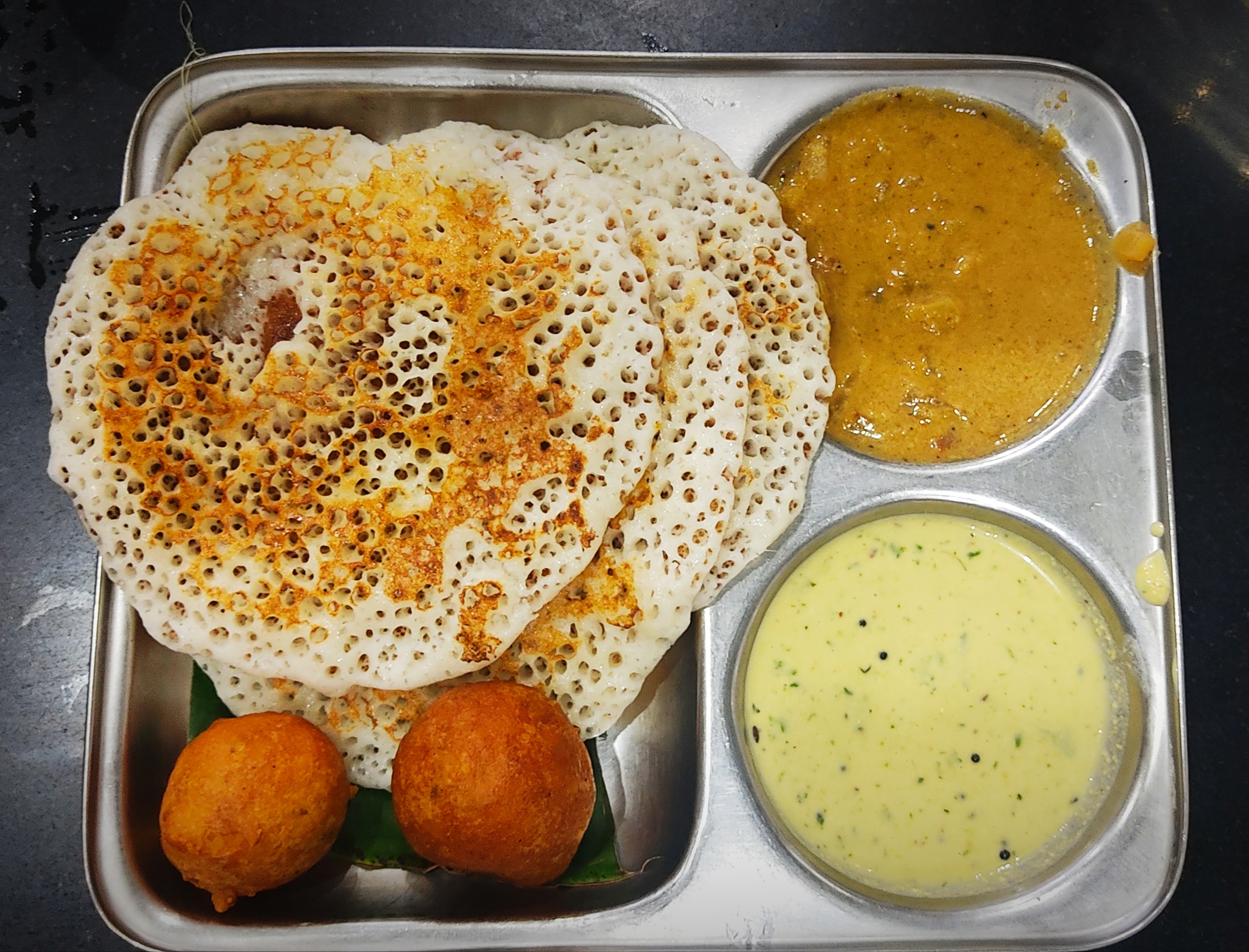
Set dosa, a set of 3 dosas with coconut chutney, curry and Mysore bonda

== World record ==
On 16 November 2014, 29 chefs, at Hotel Daspalla in Hyderabad, India, created a dosa that was 16.68 m (54.7 ft) long and weighed 13.69 kg (30.2 lb), earning the Guinness World Record for the longest dosa.

== In popular culture ==
- In a November 2019 video promoting her campaign for presidency, United States Vice President Kamala Harris cooked masala dosa with actress and comedian Mindy Kaling.
- The 2023 Tamil culture-inspired cooking video game Venba features dosa as an in-game recipe.

== Related foods ==
- Uttapam: a thick relatively soft crepe mostly topped with diced onions, tomatoes, cilantro or cheese, sometimes described as an Indian pizza
- Pesarattu: made from green gram in Andhra Pradesh, served with a ginger and tamarind chutney
- Appam: a pancake prepared from patted rice batter, served with sweet coconut milk or sugar
- Chakuli pitha: the batter contains more black gram and less rice flour
- Apam balik: made from a mixture of flour, eggs, sugar, baking soda, coconut milk and water
- Jianbing: a Chinese dish
- Bánh xèo: a Vietnamese dish
- Lahoh: a Somali dish
- Injera: an Ethiopian dish made with fermented teff batter

== See also ==
- List of fermented foods
- List of Indian breads
- List of pancakes
- Udupi cuisine
- Cuisine of Kerala
- South Indian cuisine
- Thali
