= New Krishna Bhavan =

Former vegetarian restaurant in Bengaluru, India

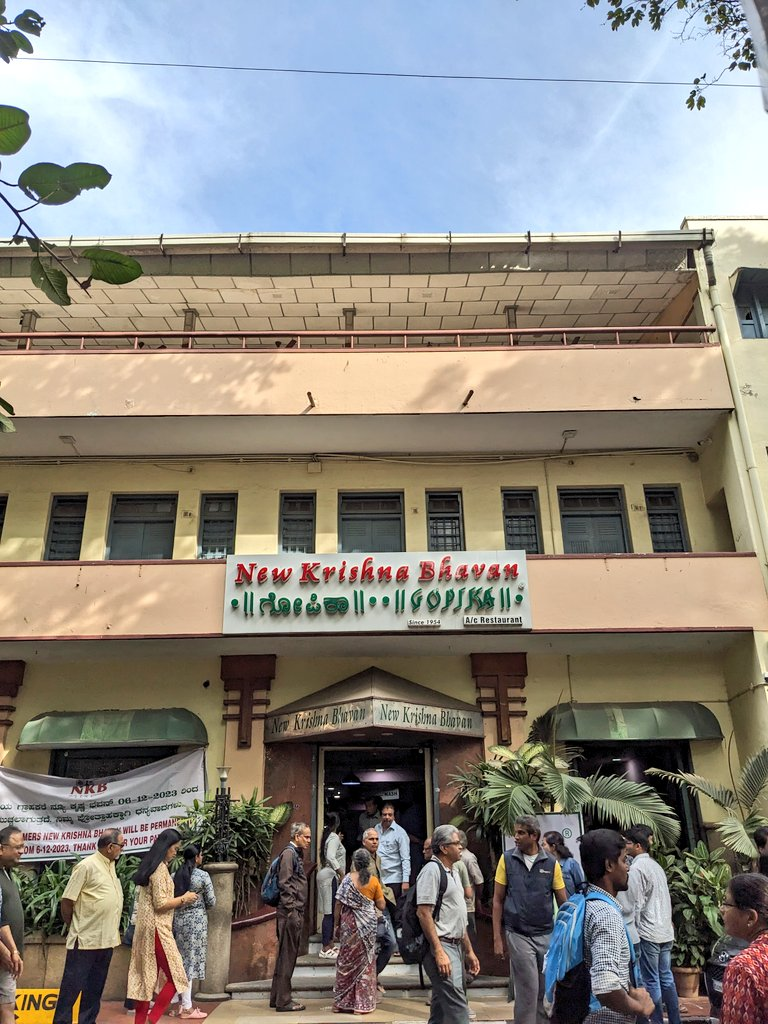
- New Krishna Bhavan in December 2023
- Interactive map of New Krishna Bhavan

Restaurant information
- Established: 1954; 72 years ago
- Closed: 6 December 2023; 2 years ago
- Owner(s): Ramakrishna Prabhu and descendants
- Food type: Udupi cuisine
- Location: 33/39, Mill Corner, Sampige Road, Bengaluru
- Coordinates: 12.9930°N 77.5717°E

New Krishna Bhavan (NKB) was a vegetarian restaurant in Malleshwaram, Bengaluru. Founded in 1954 by Ramakrishna Prabhu, it ran for seven decades as a family business and primarily served Udupi-style cuisine, as well as dishes from interior Karnataka and from North India. The restaurant was closed permanently from 6 December 2023.

== History ==
Ramakrishna Prabhu, an Udupi native, moved to Bangalore at the age of thirteen. Starting out as a dishwasher, he eventually established the Janata Hotel in the K. R. Market area. In 1954, he purchased a property on 33/39, Mill Corner, Sampige Road in Malleshwaram at a cost of ₹75,000 (equivalent to ₹7.6 million or US$79,000 in 2023) and established New Krishna Bhavan, mainly to cater to employees of the nearby Raja Mill. The restaurant initially had seating for families and a separate self-service section to handle high volumes of food—sometimes up to 3,000 four-anna meals a day—at speed. Mill workers could avail discount coupons. Students and working bachelors also frequented the restaurant.

In 1958, the restaurant unsuccessfully petitioned the High Court of Mysore in New Krishna Bhavan v. The Commercial Tax Officer, claiming that it did not have to pay sales tax, since a provision in Mysore state's sales tax law had been found unconstitutional; the petition was dismissed the next year. Early employees of India's satellite programme at the Space Science and Technology Centre in Peenya Industrial Area, which was newly set up in the 1970s, were ferried four kilometres each way every day for lunch at NKB, due to Peenya's remoteness.

After the closure of Raja Mill, the self-service area was converted into an air-conditioned dining hall called Gopika in the mid-1980s, one of a few in Bengaluru at the time. The restaurant began to receive regulars, primarily Malleshwaram residents who frequented the restaurant at the same time every day, often ordering the same dishes every day, some going on to do so for decades. Many were generational customers, with even expats making it a point to eat at the restaurant while visiting home. Ramakrishna Prabhu's sons, Sundar and Gopinath Prabhu, eventually took over operations; after Sundar died in 2001, his son Sunil took his place at the age of 24. As the restaurant became more famous, it began serving a more generalised audience and received frequent visits from notables such as actors, cricketers, and politicians.

The restaurant ceased operations on 6 December 2023, 69 years after founding. The Prabhus cited exhaustion and a desire to venture into different pursuits, both in themselves and long-time employees, as reasons for the closure. NKB's employees, some of whom had worked there for decades, were in high demand in other restaurants as it wound down. In 2024, its premises was demolished and it became a jewellery store.

== Cuisine ==
The restaurant primarily served darshini-style Udupi cuisine, including dishes such as idlis of various kinds, plain and masala dosas, rava dosas, neer dosas, Mangalore buns, guliappas (also called paddus), shavige (vermicelli) bath, khara bath and kesari bath. The signature dish was green masala idlis—fried button idlis in a sauce of onion, capsicum, and spinach. Kotte kadubus, idlis steamed in smoked jackfruit leaves, were served on weekends, with the leaves brought from Udupi on Fridays. On government working days, it also served ragi mudde meals at lunch, unusually for a darshini; the muddes were served with a saaru of gourds, greens, or lentils. Other south Indian dishes included Salem sambar vada, Mandya ragi roti, akki roti, Kerala sevai with red pumpkin curry, pongal, bisi bele bath, holige, and badam halwa. The Mini Meal included pooris, steamed rice, dry and curried vegetables, sambar, rasam, appalams, and sweets. NKB was the first restaurant in Malleshwaram to offer North Indian cuisine.

== Daily operations ==
NKB's kitchen opened at 04:00 every morning, with the restaurant opening with a limited menu at 07:30 to cater to morning walkers. A tasting of the breakfast menu was sent home to Ramakrishna Prabhu—and later, his wife—every day, for feedback. Dosas was served from 08:00 onwards, and the ragi mudde lunches between 13:15 and 14:15. The six hundred litres of sambar required daily was prepared continuously from 04:00 to 08:00, while coffee grounds were opened one 1-kg pack at a time to keep them fresh.

=== Waste management ===
In 2013, after being extorted for bribes by garbage collectors, the restaurant began handling its own waste management on a daily basis. Dry recyclable waste was directly given to ragpickers, the 300 kg of food leftovers sent to a piggery 30 km from the city, fruit waste and the 50 kg of tea and coffee residue used for manure, and the husk from the 200 coconuts used daily given to a coir ropemaker, with the shells burned to heat water. Disposable plates were switched out for metal plates to reduce waste.
