= Pheni (disambiguation) =

Pheni is a form of vermicelli from the Indian subcontinent. It may also refer to:

- Chirote, an Indian delicacy also known as pheni
- Khaja, a sweet known as pheni in Odisha, India
- Sulai, a rectified spirit (highly concentrated ethanol) known as pheni in Nepal

== See also ==
- Phény, a stream, a tributary of the Jamagne river in France
- Feni (disambiguation)
- Fény, Hungarian spelling of Foeni, a Romanian commune
