= Darshini (restaurant) =

Indian type of self-service restaurant

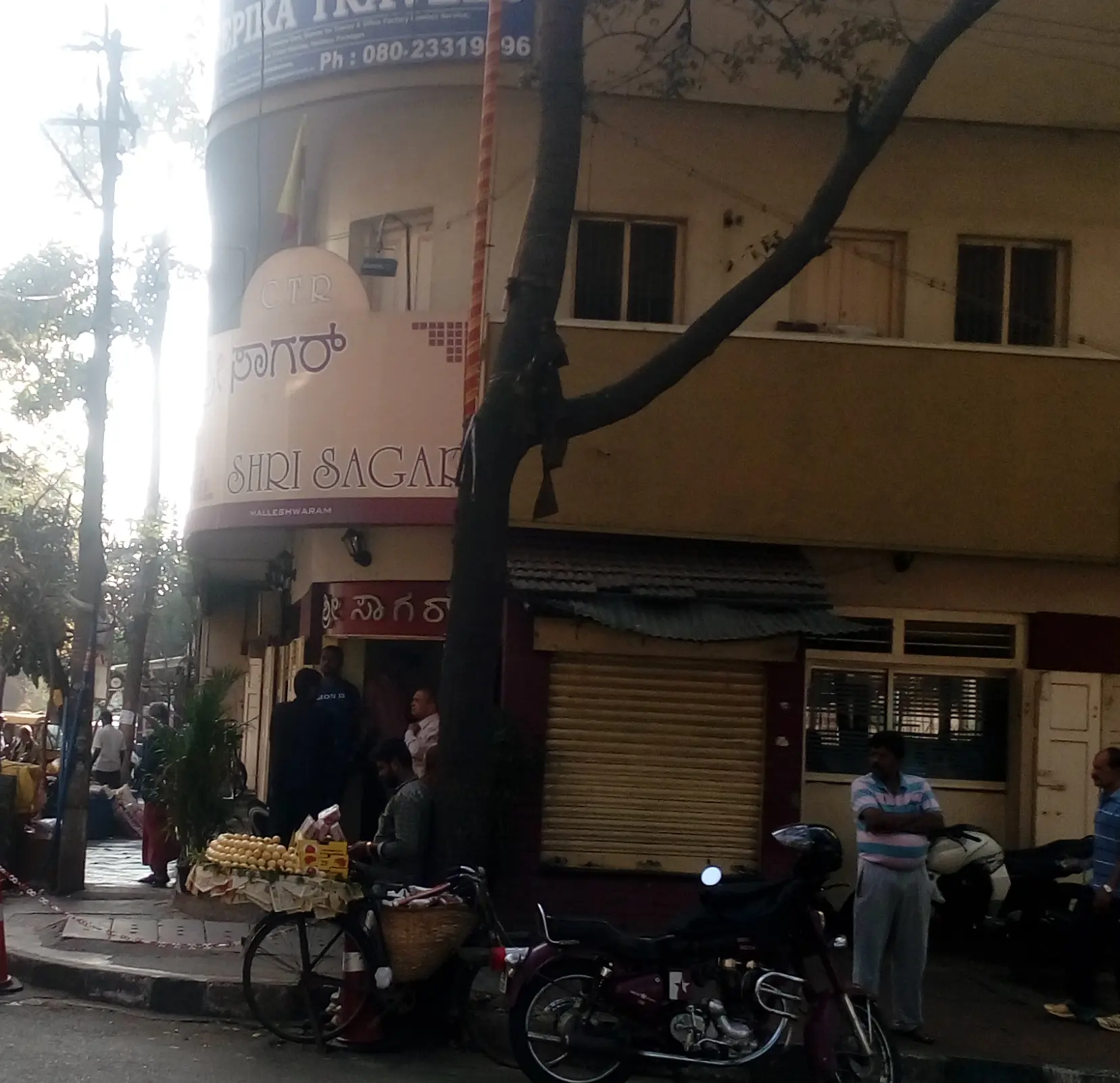
Central Tiffin Room (CTR) in Malleshwaram, Bengaluru — one of the older self-service "tiffin rooms" that preceded and influenced the darshini format

Darshinis (also spelled darshini or darshan) are a genre of self-service, vegetarian fast-food restaurants that originated in Bengaluru (Bangalore), India, in the early 1980s. Distinguished by a "pay first, eat later" system, minimal or no seating, and stainless-steel counters at which customers stand while eating, darshinis serve a standard menu of South Indian tiffin items — idli, dosa, vada, sambar, chutney and filter coffee — at low, fixed prices. By eliminating table service and seating, the format allows rapid customer turnover and low overheads, which in turn keeps prices affordable.

The concept is credited to R. Prabhakar, who opened Cafe Darshini in Jayanagar in 1983 after observing the speed of service at Western fast-food chains such as McDonald's and KFC on a trip abroad, and adapting the same operational logic to South Indian breakfast food. The model spread rapidly through Bengaluru over the following decades; by the 2010s the city was estimated to have several thousand establishments describing themselves as darshinis, making the format, in aggregate, one of India's largest informal quick-service restaurant (QSR) categories. The term became sufficiently entrenched in civic life that the erstwhile civic body Bruhat Bengaluru Mahanagara Palike (BBMP), Bengaluru's municipal corporation, has issued a distinct "Darshini type Hotel" category of trade licence since the mid-2000s.

Darshinis are widely described as a class-agnostic institution of Bengaluru's daily life, where office workers, students, retirees and manual labourers eat side by side. Since the 2010s the format has also undergone partial corporatisation, with private-equity-backed chains, standardised "mega-darshinis", and social-media-driven newcomers such as The Rameshwaram Cafe reshaping a business that had historically been run as small, family-owned outlets.

== Etymology ==
The word darshini derives from the Sanskrit darshan (दर्शन), meaning "sight" or "viewing", a term with religious connotations describing the auspicious act of beholding a deity or holy person. In the restaurant context, the name is popularly explained as referring to the open-kitchen format of the original Cafe Darshini, in which customers standing at the counter could watch ("have a darshan of") their food being prepared, rather than having it brought to them from an unseen kitchen. Commentators have also noted that "Darshini" began as a proper noun — part of the brand name of a single restaurant — before genericising into a category label, in a pattern comparable to genericised trademarks elsewhere; a wave of imitators in the 1980s adopted names such as Ganesha Darshini, Sri Krishna Darshini and Indira Darshini, cementing "darshini" as the generic term for the format itself.

== History ==
=== Precedents ===
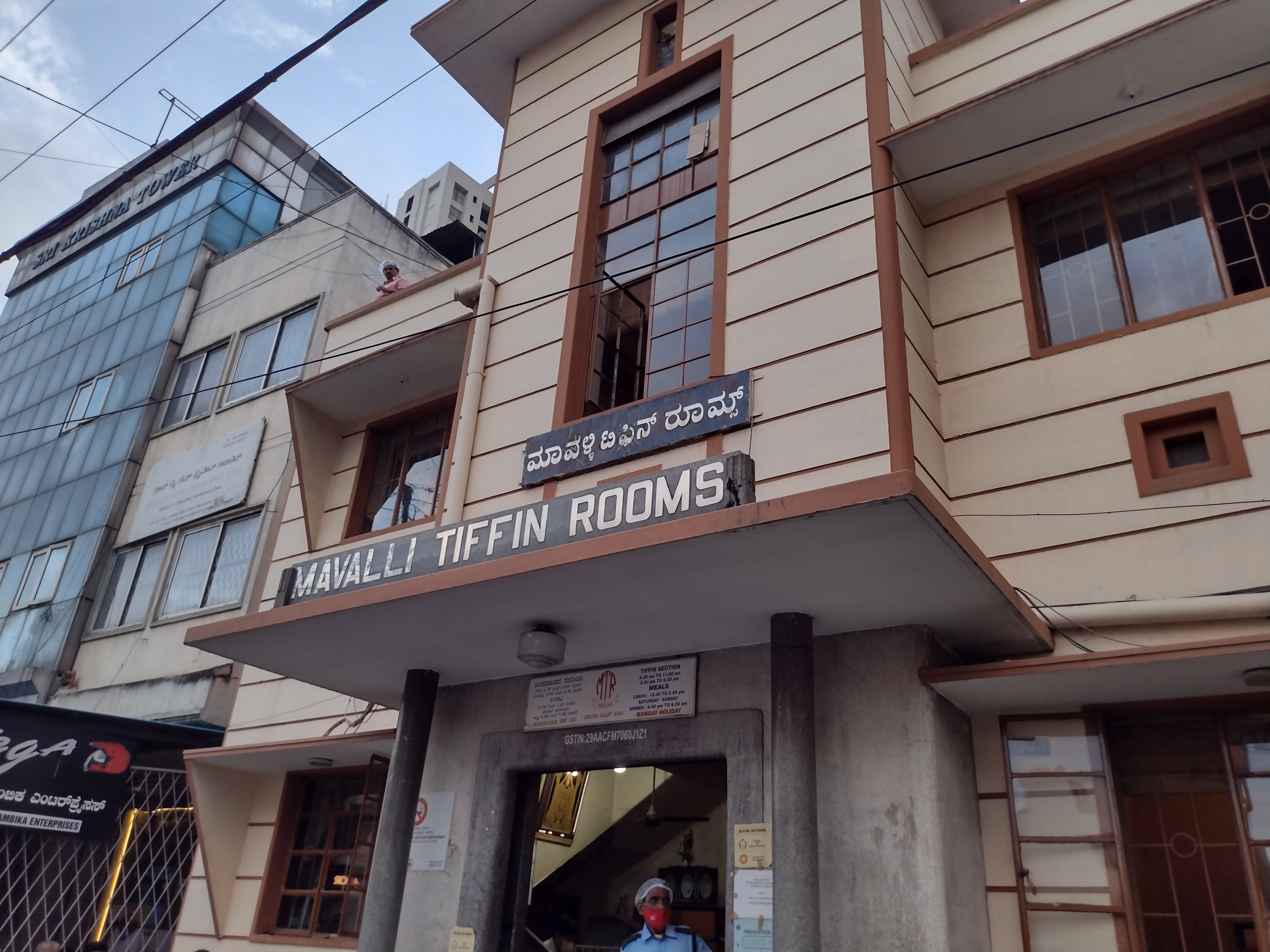
Mavalli Tiffin Room (MTR), established 1924 on Lalbagh Road, is among the older Bengaluru tiffin rooms that predated the self-service darshini format

Bengaluru had a tradition of vegetarian "tiffin rooms" and Udupi-style eating houses that predated the darshini format by decades, including Mavalli Tiffin Room (MTR, established 1924), Central Tiffin Room (CTR, also known as Shri Sagar), and Brahmin's Coffee Bar in Basavanagudi (established 1965). These establishments served the same broad category of South Indian breakfast food but retained conventional waiter service and seating. The darshini format that emerged in the 1980s is distinguished from these older tiffin rooms specifically by its self-service, pay-first counter system and its near-total elimination of seating and table service.

=== Founding ===
Cafe Darshini, generally credited as the first restaurant of the type, was opened in Jayanagar in 1983 by R. Prabhakar (also transliterated as R. K. Prabhakaran), a Bengaluru hotelier. Prabhakar has said he was inspired by the speed and efficiency of Western fast-food chains and sought to apply the same self-service, no-frills model to South Indian vegetarian food, despite initial scepticism that Bengaluru diners — accustomed to sit-down service — would accept eating standing up. The format proved immediately popular, and Cafe Darshini was, according to contemporary accounts, crowded from the outset. Upahara Darshini, a nearby establishment in the Gandhi Bazaar area of Basavanagudi, is also frequently cited in popular accounts as the first or among the first restaurants of the type, and remains in operation. Cafe Darshini itself has since closed.

=== Spread and chains ===
Through the late 1980s and 1990s, the darshini model was widely replicated across Bengaluru, with many new outlets adopting "Darshini" as part of their name. Several chains built on the format into multi-outlet businesses. Vasudev Adiga opened the first Adiga's restaurant in 1992–1993, drawing on techniques learned at his father's Brahmin's Coffee Bar; the chain grew to around 30 outlets and, by the mid-2010s, was valued at over ₹100 crore. In 2012, private equity firm New Silk Route, through its affiliate South Asia Gastronomy Enterprises, acquired a controlling stake in Vasudev Adiga's Fast Food, with plans for an approximately ₹165 crore, pan-India expansion; the transaction was followed by protracted litigation between Adiga and the new investors over control of the company, as well as separate trademark disputes with his brother and with unrelated businesses over use of the "Adiga's" name. The Adigas brand has since changed hands again, and as of the mid-2020s operates under Kouzina Food Tech. Vasudev Adiga subsequently founded a separate restaurant venture, Sri Anantheswara Foods.

Other chains associated with the format, or with the closely related Udupi-restaurant tradition from which many darshini operators are drawn, include Kamat Hotels, New Shanti Sagar and Sukh Sagar; ownership of the sector has historically been dominated by families from the Udupi–Mangalore coastal region of Karnataka, notably those bearing the Nayak, Shetty and Kamath surnames.

=== Corporatisation and reinvention ===
From the 2010s, the darshini format began to be reimagined by newer entrants applying formal process-management and branding techniques to what had traditionally been run as small, family-managed outlets. According to a 2023 account in Mint, some newer operators have explicitly adapted manufacturing concepts such as just-in-time manufacturing, first in, first out inventory rotation, and the Toyota Production System to darshini kitchen operations. Establishments such as Bengaluru Cafe, Taaza Thindi and South Kitchen adopted more Westernised branding, deliberately rustic interiors, and greater emphasis on standardised hygiene, in what the same account described as a gradual gentrification of the format as neighbourhoods such as Jayanagar saw an influx of students and information-technology professionals.

The most prominent recent entrant has been The Rameshwaram Cafe, founded in Bengaluru and built around a large-format outlet with digital ordering kiosks, UPI payment, and an active social-media presence — a marked departure from older darshinis, which have typically relied on word-of-mouth reputation built up over decades. In March 2024, the chain's Brookefield outlet was the target of a bomb attack that injured several people; the attack was later attributed by investigators to individuals linked to ISIS and is documented separately as the 2024 Bengaluru cafe bombing.

== Characteristics ==
=== Business model ===
The defining features of the darshini format are a pay-first, self-service counter system; the near-total absence of table service; and minimal or no seating, with many outlets instead providing tall steel counters at which customers stand to eat. Customers typically pay a cashier and receive a token, which is exchanged for food at a separate serving counter. By removing the need for waiting staff and dine-in furniture, the model reduces both labour and real-estate overheads relative to conventional restaurants, which supporters of the format credit for the sector's comparatively low failure rate against an industry generally known for high turnover of establishments. Some outlets offer a hybrid arrangement, combining a self-service darshini counter with an adjoining seated, waiter-service section.

=== Menu ===
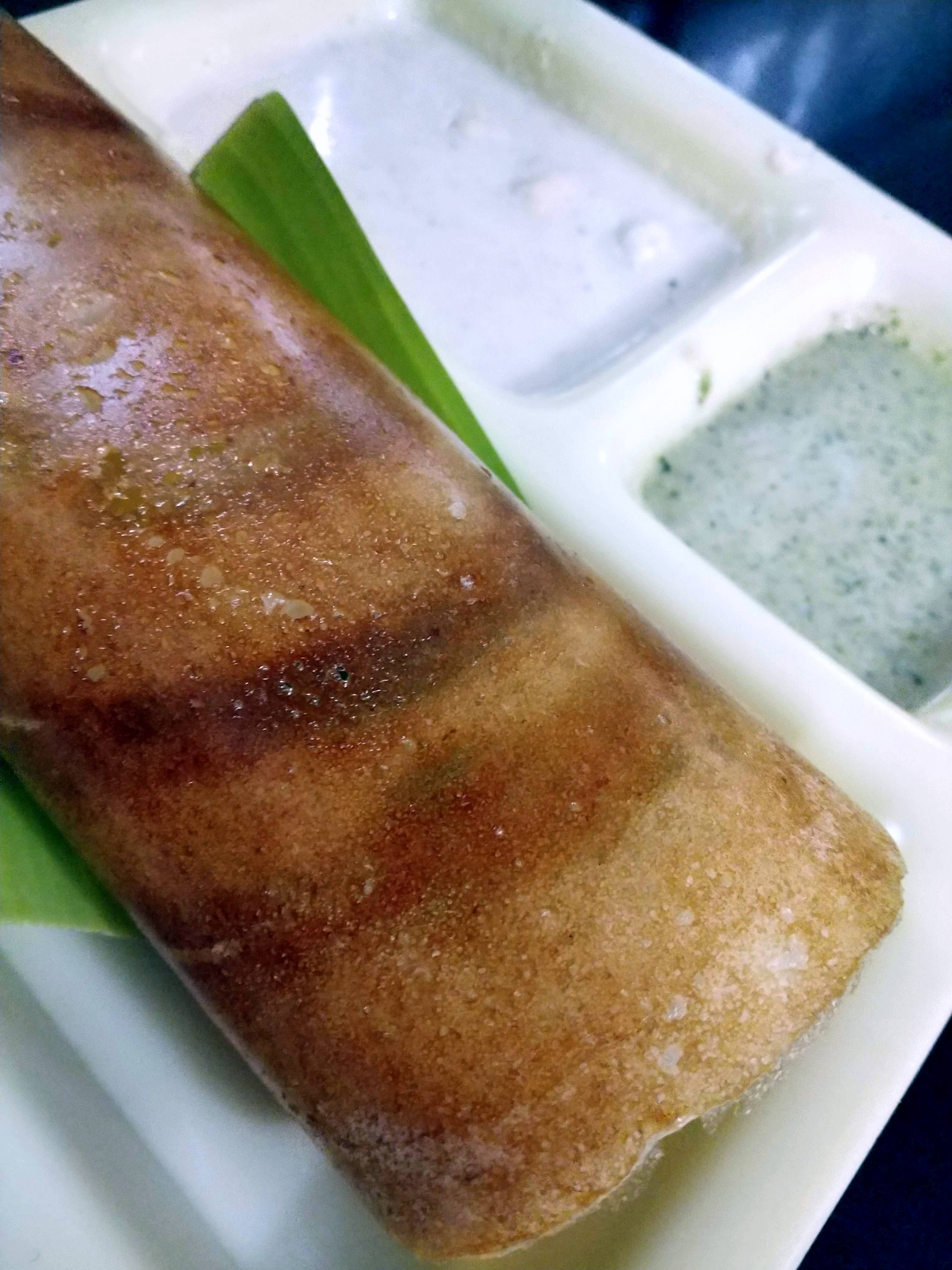
A ghee-roasted masala dosa, one of the staple items on a darshini menu

The core darshini menu is built around South Indian breakfast and snack items — idli, vada, dosa in various forms (including the masala dosa and the Davanagere-style benne dosa), sambar, chutneys, chow-chow bath (a combination of kesari bath and khara bath), and filter coffee — alongside simple lunch thalis. Larger or "mega" darshinis have expanded their offerings to include chaat, juices, and North Indian and Indo-Chinese dishes. All darshini food is strictly vegetarian.

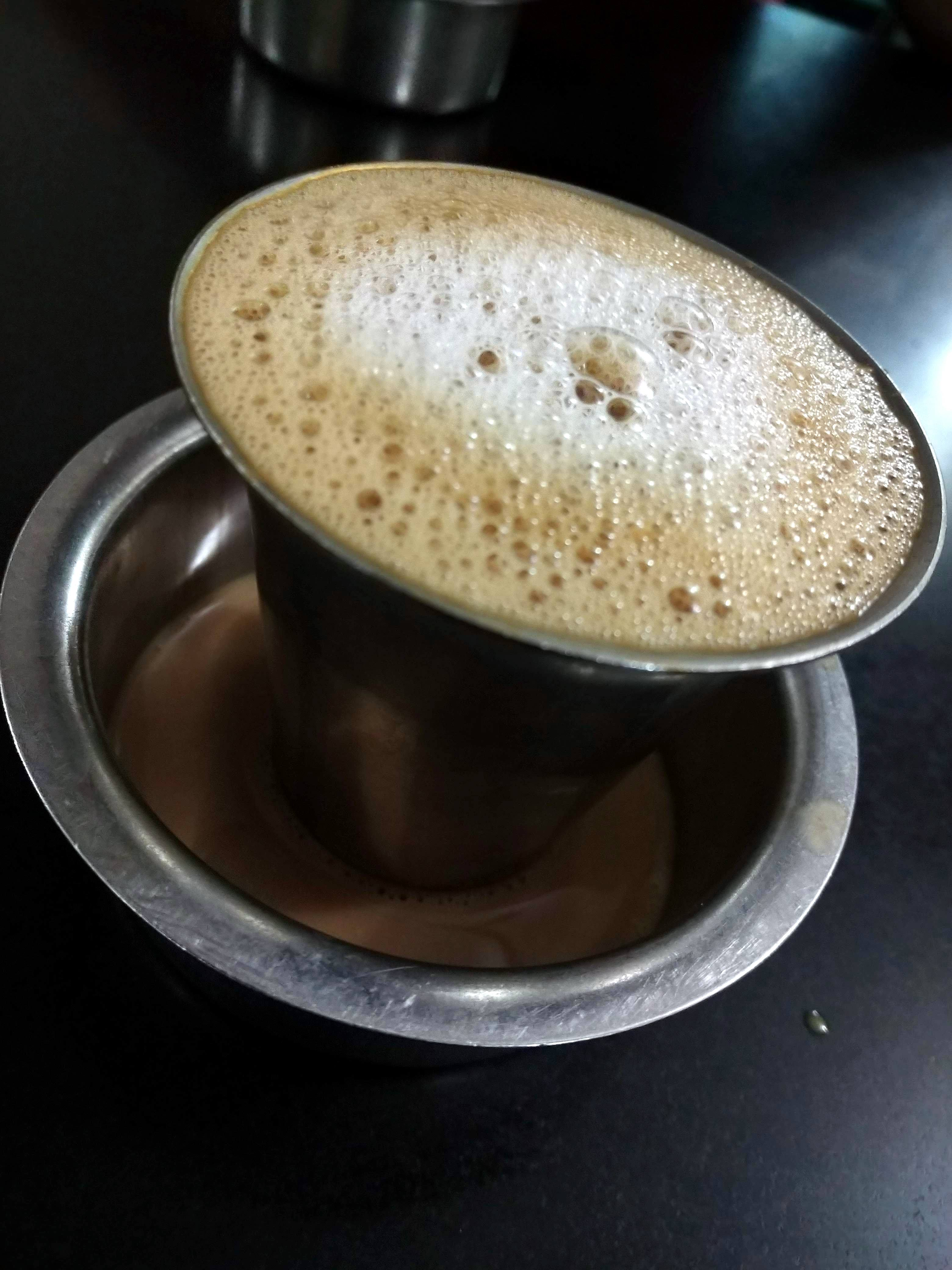
South Indian filter coffee, traditionally served in a stainless-steel tumbler and dabarah, is a standard item on darshini menus

== Regulation ==
The scale of the format in Bengaluru led the BBMP to formalise "Darshini type Hotel" as a distinct category within its trade-licensing schedule for eating establishments, alongside categories such as air-conditioned restaurants and small tea stalls, since the mid-2000s. Like other food businesses, darshinis are subject to inspection by municipal health officials and by the Food Safety and Standards Authority of India (FSSAI) and its Karnataka state counterpart; periodic enforcement drives have resulted in fines and, in some cases, temporary closure of individual outlets for hygiene or, during the COVID-19 pandemic, public-health violations.

== Cultural significance ==
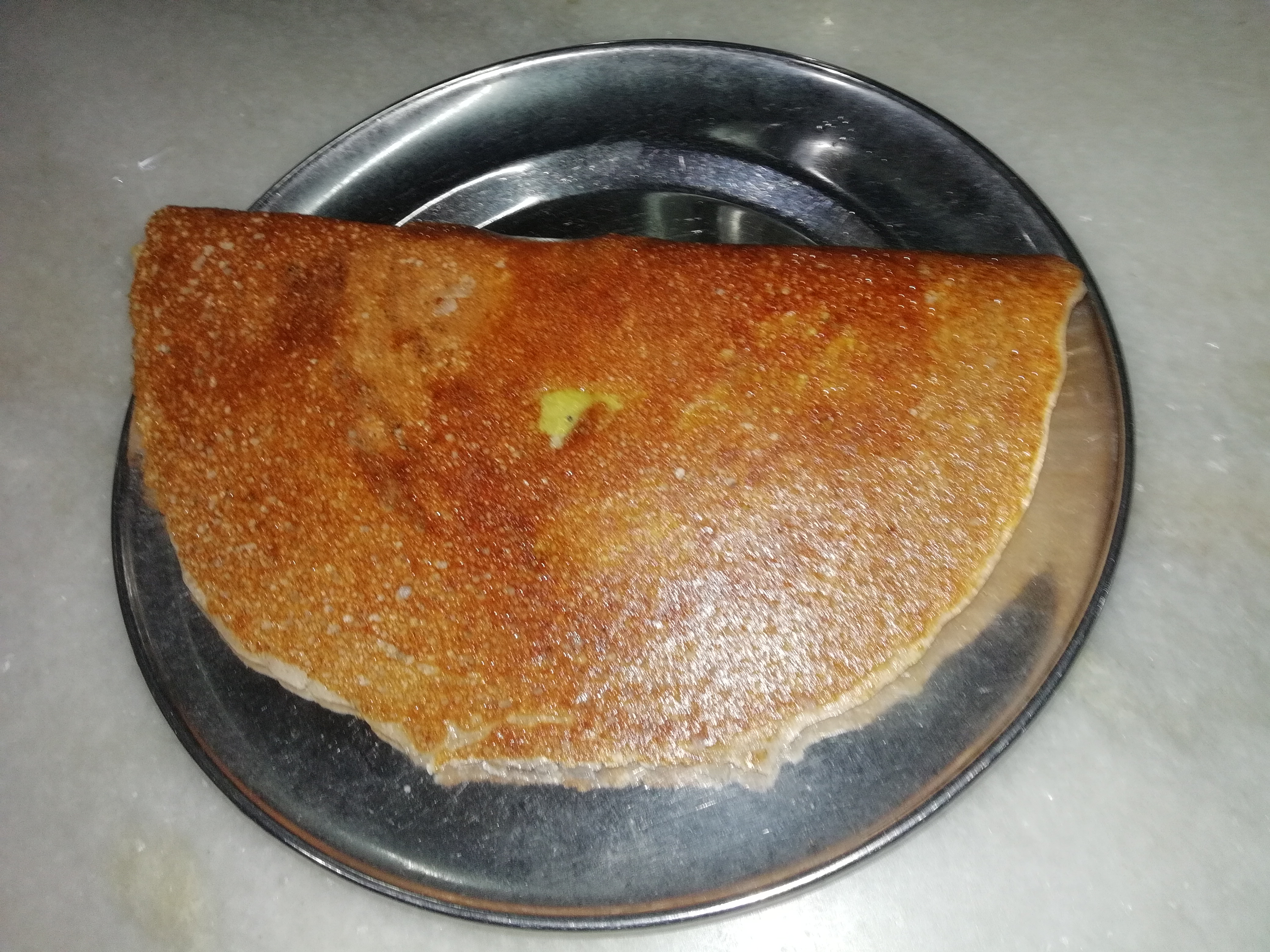
A masala dosa at Vidyarthi Bhavan (established 1943) in Basavanagudi, a tiffin house frequently listed among Bengaluru's iconic darshini-style eateries

The darshini is widely treated as Bengaluru's defining food-culture institution, occupying a position in the city's identity comparable to that of paranthe wali gali in Delhi, street-side roll stalls in Kolkata, or vada pav and Irani cafés in Mumbai. Commentary on the format has argued that no Bengaluru street can be considered complete without at least one darshini, treating it as the city's characteristic contribution to India's regional street-food traditions.

Beyond its role as a food format, the darshini is frequently described as a socially levelling institution. Because seating is minimal or absent and service is fast, writers have depicted darshinis as spaces where older men in traditional dhotis, women in everyday cotton sarees, uniformed schoolchildren, office workers and daily-wage labourers routinely share the same counters, with a bus driver as likely to be served next to a businessman as a college student is to queue behind a construction worker. This is frequently framed as a deliberate contrast with more stratified dining establishments, where seating, service order and price act as social sorting mechanisms.

Given Bengaluru's history as a magnet for internal migration — driven first by public-sector industry and later by the information-technology boom — some accounts have described darshinis as an informal point of social integration for newcomers to the city, functioning as a shared, low-cost meeting ground for people of different regional, linguistic and economic backgrounds who might otherwise have little daily contact. At the same time, some cultural writing has noted the format's origins and continuing character as reflecting Brahminical vegetarian food norms, and its brisk, transactional style of service, in which regular patrons are expected to know the unspoken routine of paying, taking a token, collecting food, eating standing up, and leaving.

The daily rhythm of many Bengaluru neighbourhoods has historically been tied to darshini opening hours, with many outlets opening as early as 5:30–6:00 am to serve breakfast to commuters, market vendors and early risers. Several accounts describe the darshini's unvarying routine and steady presence in a fast-changing city as itself a source of nostalgic attachment, with long-time residents associating the format with childhood memory and a sense of continuity even as Bengaluru's wider dining landscape has diversified. Older, single-location darshinis such as Vidyarthi Bhavan (Basavanagudi, established 1943) and Upahara Darshini have acquired landmark status within the city and are frequently cited in "best of Bengaluru" food guides.

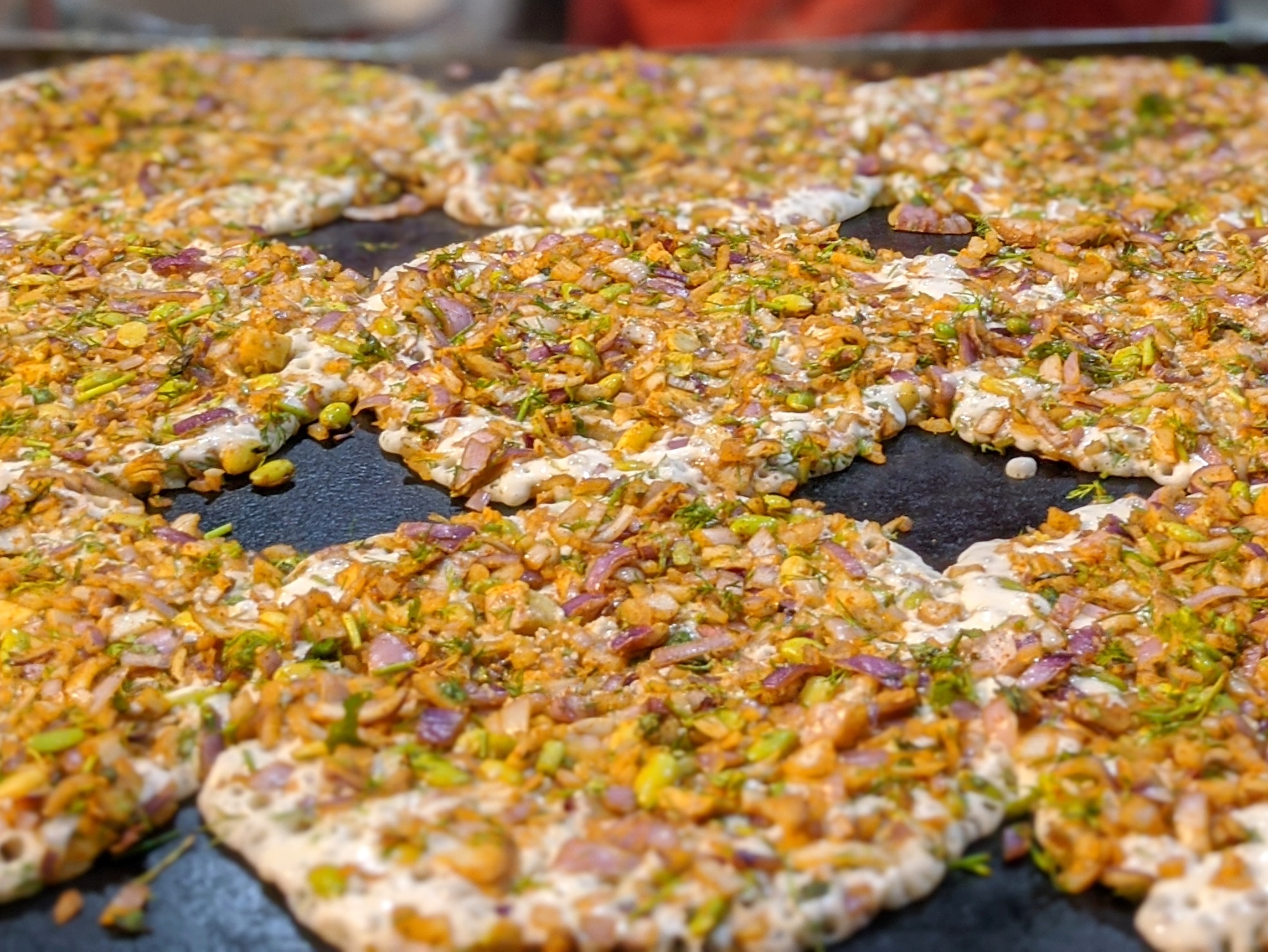
A dosa variant sold on VV Puram Food Street, part of the wider ecosystem of South Indian quick-service food outlets in Bengaluru

== Challenges ==
The rise of food-delivery aggregators such as Swiggy and Zomato since the mid-2010s has altered darshinis' traditionally walk-in, cash-based business model; some operators have raised menu prices on delivery platforms to offset commission costs, a practice noted in commentary on online food-delivery pricing in Bengaluru. The COVID-19 pandemic also disrupted the sector's high-footfall, low-margin model, with several outlets temporarily closed for lockdown or hygiene-protocol violations. Sector observers have also noted competitive pressure on smaller, family-run darshinis from better-capitalised, professionally managed newer chains.

== See also ==
- Udupi cuisine
- List of vegetarian and vegan restaurants
- Mavalli Tiffin Room
- Cuisine of Karnataka
