= Fenis =

Fenis may refer to:

- Fénis, a town and comune in the Aosta Valley, Italy
- Feniș, a village in the commune Gurahonț, Arad County, Romania
- Feniș, a tributary of the river Crișul Alb in Arad County, Romania
- Vinelz, formerly Fenis, a municipality in Switzerland
- Fenis Bently, American football coach

== See also ==
- Feni (disambiguation)
