= MTR Foods =

Indian spice company

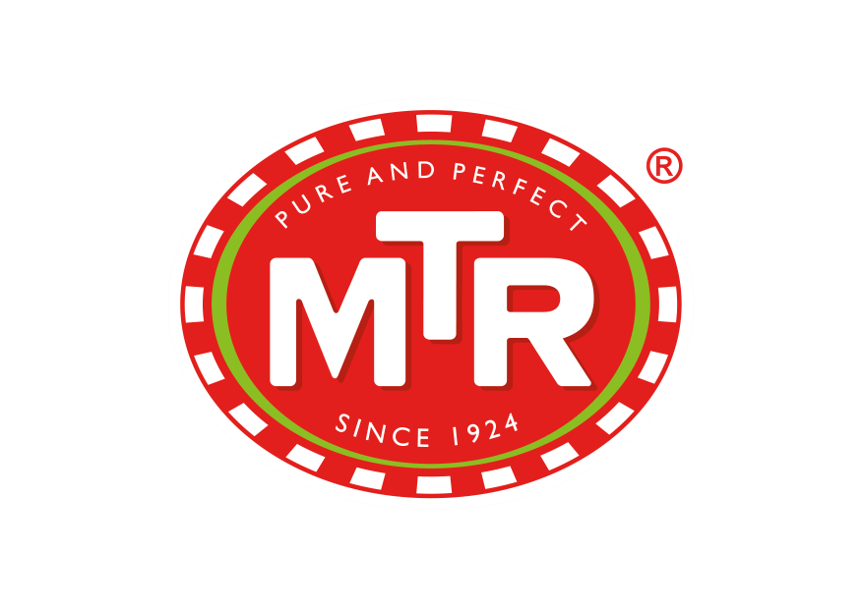
- MTR Foods logo
- Type: Public
- Traded as: NSE: ORKLAINDIA; BSE: 544595
- Industry: Food
- Founded: 1924
- Headquarters: Bengaluru, Karnataka, India
- Revenue: ▲₹2,455 crore (US$260 million) (2025)
- Net income: ▲₹255 crore (US$27 million) (2025)
- Owners: Orkla Group (75%); Navas Meeran (4.2%); Firoz Meeran (4.2%)
- Parent: Orkla Group
- Website: mtrfoods.com
- Footnotes; Financials as of 31 March 2025.

Orkla India Limited, formerly known as MTR Foods, is an Indian food products company based in Bengaluru. The company manufactures packaged foods including breakfast mixes, ready to eat meals, masalas and spices, snacks and beverages. It is a subsidiary of Norwegian conglomerate Orkla.

== History ==
The company began with the establishment of the Mavalli Tiffin Room (commonly known as MTR) restaurant in Bangalore in 1924 by Yagnanarayana Maiya.

In 1975, when India was under emergency, a Food Control Act was introduced which mandated that food was to be sold at very low prices. This move made it difficult for MTR to maintain high standards in its restaurant business and forced it to diversify into the instant food business by the following year, selling ready-to-eat snacks such as chutneys and rasams. In 1984, MTR expanded out of Karnataka to the southern states of Tamil Nadu and Andhra Pradesh.

In 2007, Orkla Group, a Norwegian conglomerate, acquired MTR Foods for $80 million.

In 2011, MTR launched a sub-brand called MTR SnackUp with traditional South Indian snacks like Khara Boondi and Benne Murukku. In 2017, MTR launched a new brand called Laban.

In 2020, Orkla Group announced that its subsidiary MTR Foods would acquire Kochi-based Eastern Condiments. As part of the deal, Eastern Condiments' owners Meeran family obtained a 9.99% stake in the combined entity.

In 2023, MTR Foods was renamed as Orkla India. Orkla India went public in November 2025 with an initial public offering (IPO).
