= Ajethna =

- Alternative names: Ajadina
- Type: Curry
- Place of origin: India
- Region or state: Karnataka
- Main ingredients: Vegetables (cluster beans, french beans, beetroot, snake gourd, bitter gourd)

Ajethna or ajadina is a dry gravyless vegetable curry. Ajadina means dried in the Tulu language. The ajethna is eaten along with plain cooked rice as part of Udupi cuisine. The vegetables generally used in ajethna are cluster beans, french beans, beetroot, snake gourd, bitter gourd, pumpkin, ladies finger, and others.
