= Udupi cuisine =

Cuisine of South India

Udupi cuisine (also known as Udipi) is a cuisine of South India. It forms an important part of Tuluva cuisine and takes its name from Udupi, a city on the southwest coast of India in the Tulunad region of the state of Karnataka.

Most of Udupi cuisine is strictly vegetarian. However, other elements of Udupi cuisine are non-vegetarian and common to Mangalorean cuisine.

Udupi cuisine has its origin in the Udupi Sri Krishna Matha founded by Madhvacharya. Shivalli Brahmins are famous for "Udupi hotels" (vegetarian restaurants) known for serving typical south Indian dishes like idli, vada, dosa, shira and upma. The cuisine was developed by Madhva Brahmins to offer different kinds of food to Krishna at the Udupi Krishna Temple. Hence, Udupi cuisine is also synonymously known as Shivalli Madhva cuisine.

Udupi cuisine comprises dishes made primarily from grains, beans, vegetables, and fruits. The variety and range of dishes is wide, and a hallmark of the cuisine involves the use of locally available ingredients. The famous dosa (thick crisp pancakes, plain or masala when stuffed with potatoes) is said to have originated from this cuisine.

Following the tradition of chaaturmasa vrata, which is a restriction of certain food ingredients in a certain period or season, may have led to the innovation of a variety of dishes in Udupi cuisine. Pumpkins and gourds are the main ingredients in sambar, a stew prepared with ground coconut and coconut oil as its base.

The ubiquitous Indian dish dosa has its origins in Udupi, according to P. Thankappan Nair. Saaru, a spicy pepper water, is another essential part of the menu, and so are jackfruit, colocasia leaves, raw green bananas, mango pickle, red chillies, and salt. Adyes (dumplings), ajadinas (dry curries or stir fry curries), and chutneys, including one made of the skin of the ridge gourd, are specialities.

== Typical dishes ==
- Ale bajji
- Bhaji
- Kosambari (seasoned salad of lentils)
- Neer dosa
- Paayasa (kheer)
- Saaru or rasam
- Spiced rice
- Tallu or ajethna or ajadina (dry curry)
- Meen saar or meen curry
- Uppadachir (raw jackfruit soaked in crystal salt)

== Full-course Udupi meals ==
The full course Udupi meal is served on a plantain leaf, which is traditionally kept on the ground. The dishes are served in a particular sequence, and each dish is placed on a particular spot of the plantain leaf. All the people eating this meal are expected to begin and end eating the meal together. A person cannot get up in middle of the meal, even though he has finished his meal. The start and end of meal is done by saying "Govinda," the name of Lord Vishnu. A typical meal(Oota) is served with the following (in sequence):

- Abbhigara/Tuppa or Ghee
- Salt
- Uppinakayi or Pickle
- Kosambari (seasoned salad made from split Bengal gram or pea)
- Palya
- Gojju
- Bajji
- Chutney
- Ajethna
- Spiced rice (chitranna)
- Happalla or Sandige
- Steamed rice
- Tovve (lentil dish)
- Saaru (a spicy watery soup)
- Koddel
- Menaskai
- Majjige huli, Puli kajipu
- Sweets like laddu, holige, Kesari bhath, chiroti, Jalebi
- Fried items like bonda, chakli, vada
- Paramanna or Kheer (pudding) or Payasa
- Majjige or Buttermilk / Mosaru or curd

Depending upon the occasion, individual taste, and money, each dish may be made from different ingredients.

== Popular dishes in Udupi cuisine ==
- Buns (Mangalore buns), a sweet dish fried out of Maida flour and Banana
- Idli, dosa, Masala dosa, neer dose, uppu huli kara dosa
- Gashi or Ghasi (thick gravy-like dish made by use of peas or pulses with coconut)
- Kadubu
- Kashi halwa from musk pumpkin, jackfruit, banana, and bottle gourd
- Kodhel or sambar (sambar made from lentil, coconut and vegetable of choice)
- Kosambari (salads of green gram or Bengal gram lentils, seasoned)
- Mangalore bajji or Golibaje
- Menaskai (especially made of Amtekai or ambade)
- Patrode (colacasia leaves dipped in batter and steamed cooked)
- Putnis
- Pelakai appa (fried dumplings made from jackfruit)
- Pelakai Gatti/gidde
- Pelakai halwa (jackfruit halwa)
- Puddings or parammanna or payasa or kheer
- Saaru or rasam (rasam made from lentil and tomato)
- Sajjige and bajil (upma made from coarse semolina and seasoned beaten rice)
- Sweet dishes like sajjige, maddi, manni, kaai holige, undae (laddu)
- Uddinahittu (urad flour or potato mashed mixed in curd and seasoned)

== Overview of Udupi cuisine ==
| Food item | Ingredients | Preparation | Image | Remarks |
|---|---|---|---|---|
| Masala Dosa | Rice, Lentils (deskinned black gram) | Dosa with ghee; stuffed with cooked potatoes | | Invented by Udupi hotels. |
| Pathrode | Colacasia leaves, Rice | Spiced rice flour applied to colacasia leaves, rolled and steamed | | Popular during the rainy season |
| Kashi halwa | Ash gourd, sugar, cashew, ghee | Grated Ash gourd cooked with sugar, ghee, nuts, and a pinch of yellow food colour | | Famous dessert in karnataka |
| Kotte kadubu | Rice, Lentils (deskinned black gram) | Steamed batter in jackfruit leaves | | Mooday/Moode is a similar preparation steamed in screw pine leaves. |
| Neer dosa | Rice | Dosa prepared from rice flour | | |
| Undla kai | Rice | Steamed rice balls | | Rainy season dish |
| Shyavige or Ottu shyavige | Rice, Grated coconut | Rice based vermicelli | | |
| Goli Baje | Maida | Deep fried balls of batter | | Also called Mangalore bajji |
| Halasina Kadubu | Rice, Jackfruit | Steamed ground rice and jackfruit | | |
| Thambuli | Coconut, buttermilk, brahmi leaf | | | Enjoyed as a side-dish |

== Udupi restaurants ==
Udupi restaurants can be found all over India and many parts of the world. In the past, these restaurants were run by cooks and priests trained at Krishna matha in Udupi. With rising popularity, many others have entered this business. Most Udupi restaurants are family run, with ownership passing among kith and kin of the original owner. Udupi restaurants have undergone many changes in their menu in recent times, adapting to changing economic structure and social statuses in India. They have included vegetarian delicacies from other Indian cuisines.

The first major Udupi restaurant owner, K. Krishna Rao, began his career in food service as an attendant in ceremonies held by the Sri Krishna Temple, wherein food was served to gatherings of the temple staff and pilgrims. In 1922, he moved to Madras and joined Sharada Vilas Brahmins Hotel in George Town as a kitchen servant. He is the inventor of Masala Dosa. In 1925, his employer offered him one of his restaurants for ₹700 monthly. In 1939 Rao started his first hotel Udupi Sri Krishna Vilas, now called Old Woodlands. The other prominent chain of Udupi restaurant is the Dasaprakash group, founded by K. Seetharama Rao, who gave up a low-grade salaried position in Mangalore to join his brothers' snack food (tiffin) business in Mysore in 1921.

In 1923, a major flood devastated Udupi and caused mass migration of male workers and professionals to large cities. This led to a rising demand for low-cost public eating places. Several prominent Udupi restaurants such as Dasaprakash in Mysore, Udupi Sri Krishna Bhavan and Mavalli Tiffin Rooms in Bangalore, were set up to cater to this demand. These restaurants were vegetarian, employed OBCs and upper-caste Hindus from Udupi, and initially, segregated seating spaces along caste lines.

Mumbai, Madras, Mysore, and Bangalore were important destinations for migrants from Udupi, and many restaurants were set up there. In Matunga in Mumbai, many Udupi restaurants such as Ramanayaks and Cafe Madras were established in the 1930s and 1940s. In the following decades, Udupi restaurants spread to all states and are now found in every corner of India. Eventually, it crossed national boundaries and reached cities with Indian diasporas around the world.

== Gallery ==
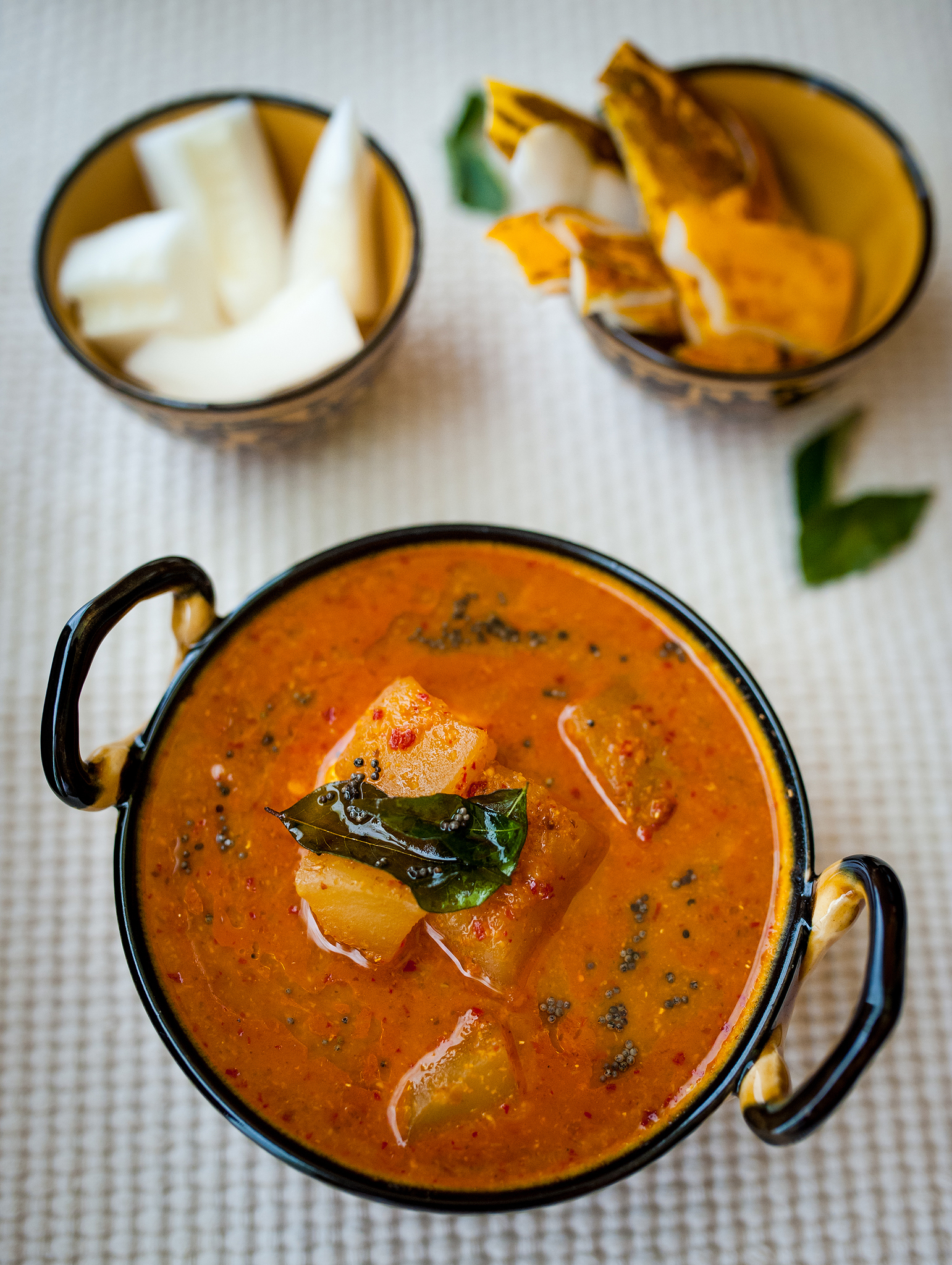
Puli koddel is one of the traditional and authentic Udupi dishes made specially during the festive season in the temples.

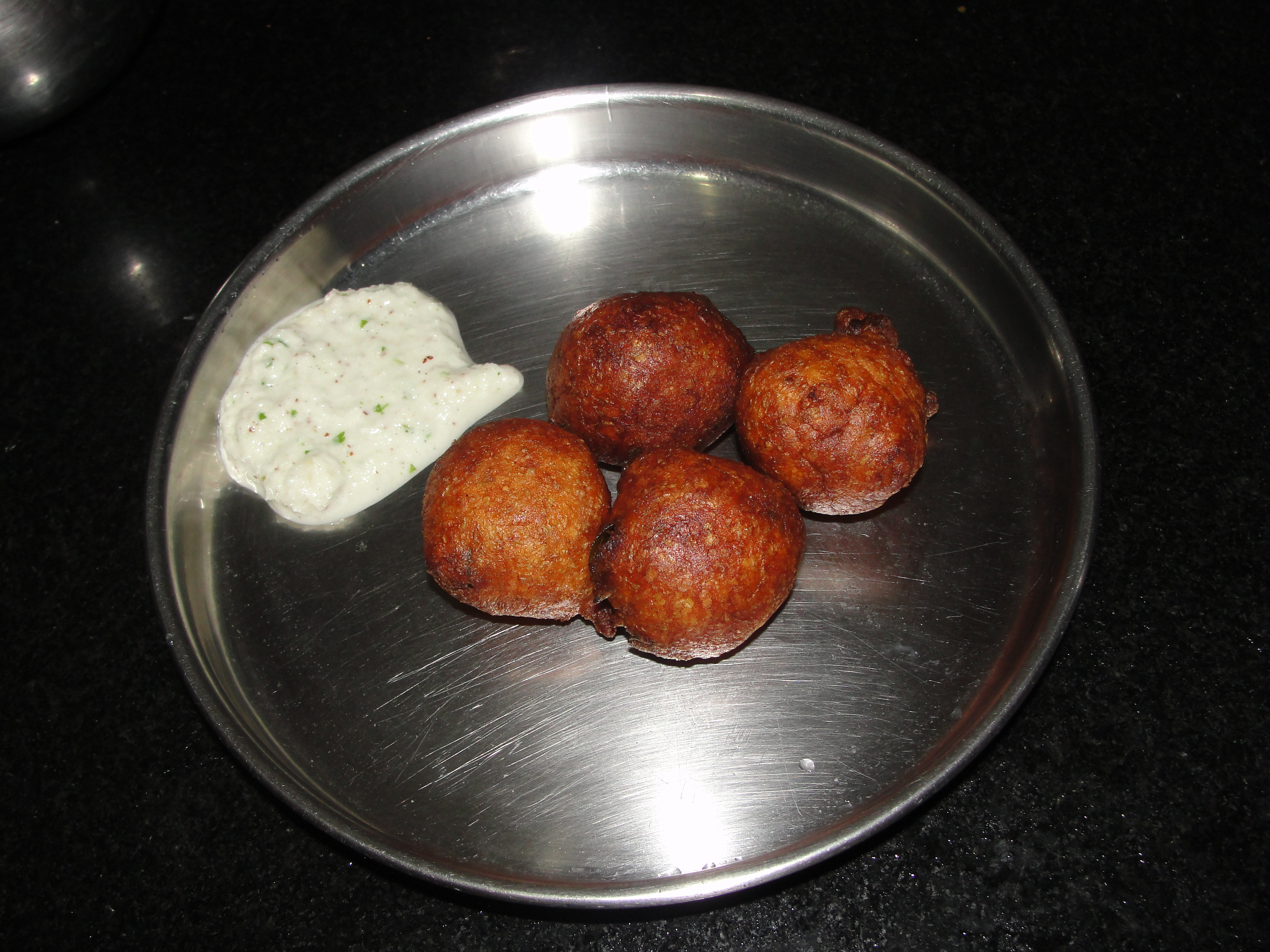
Goli baje, or Mangalore bajji, Udupi cuisine

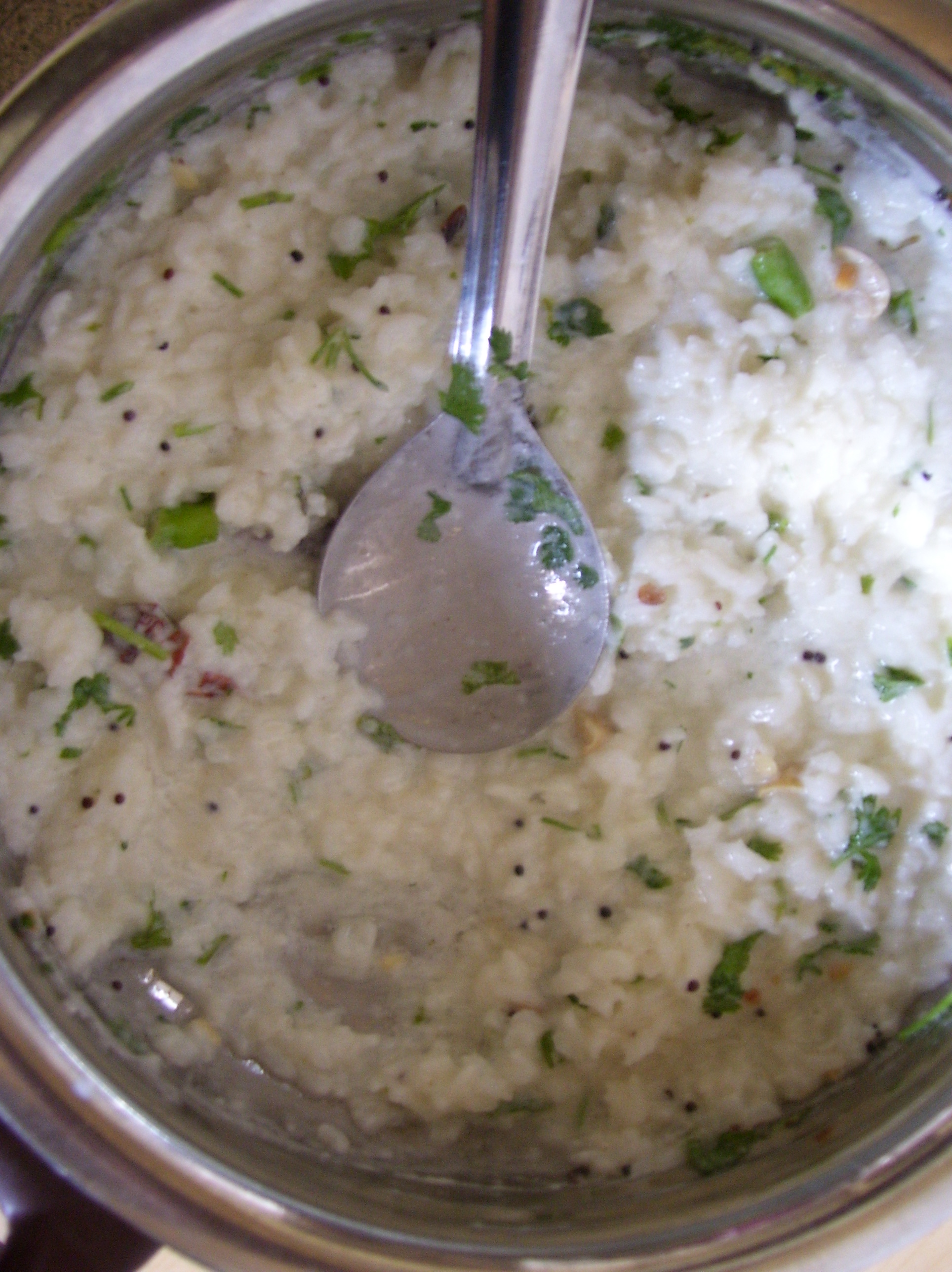
Spiced curd rice

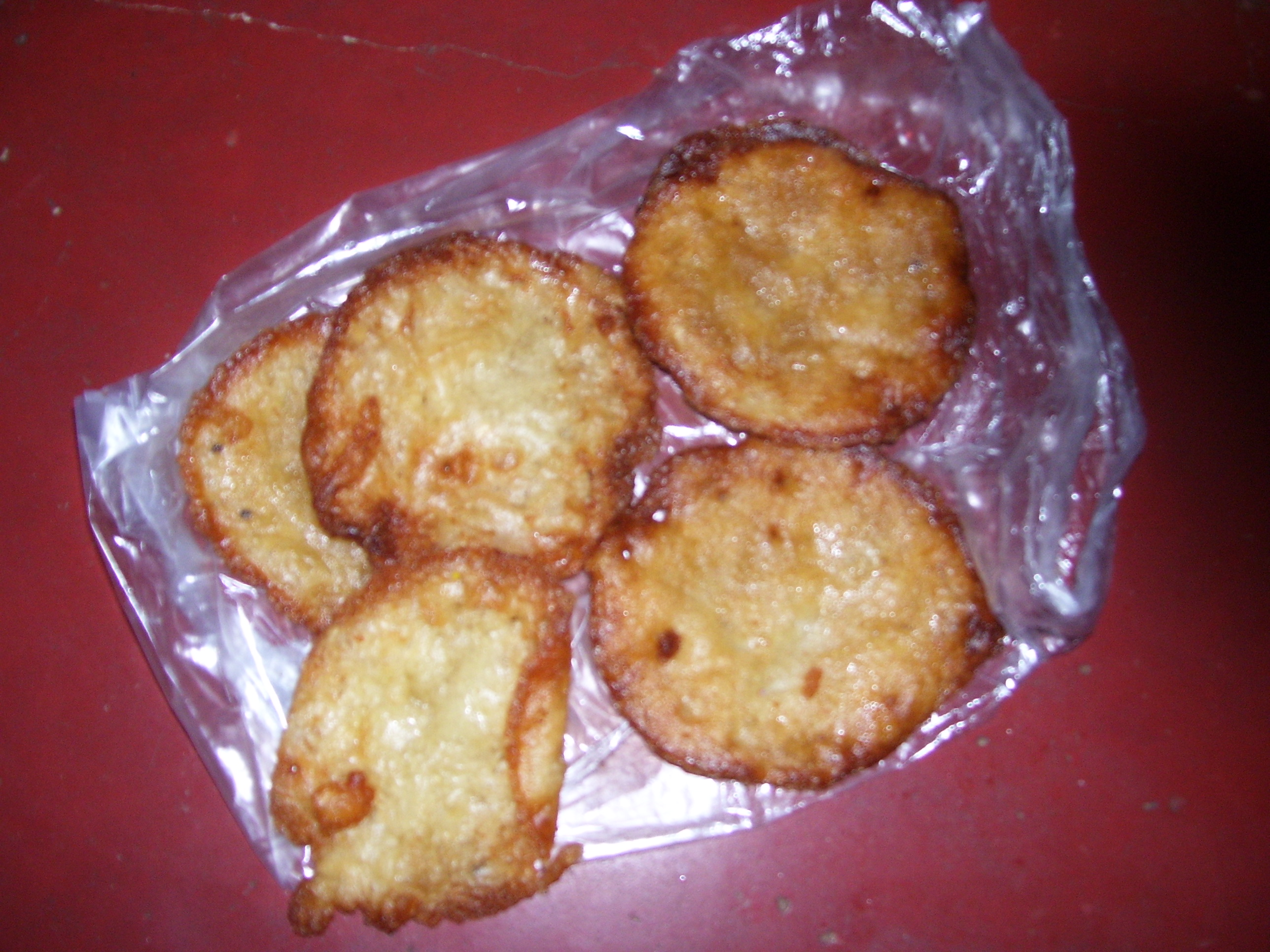
Malpuri, a Udupi dessert

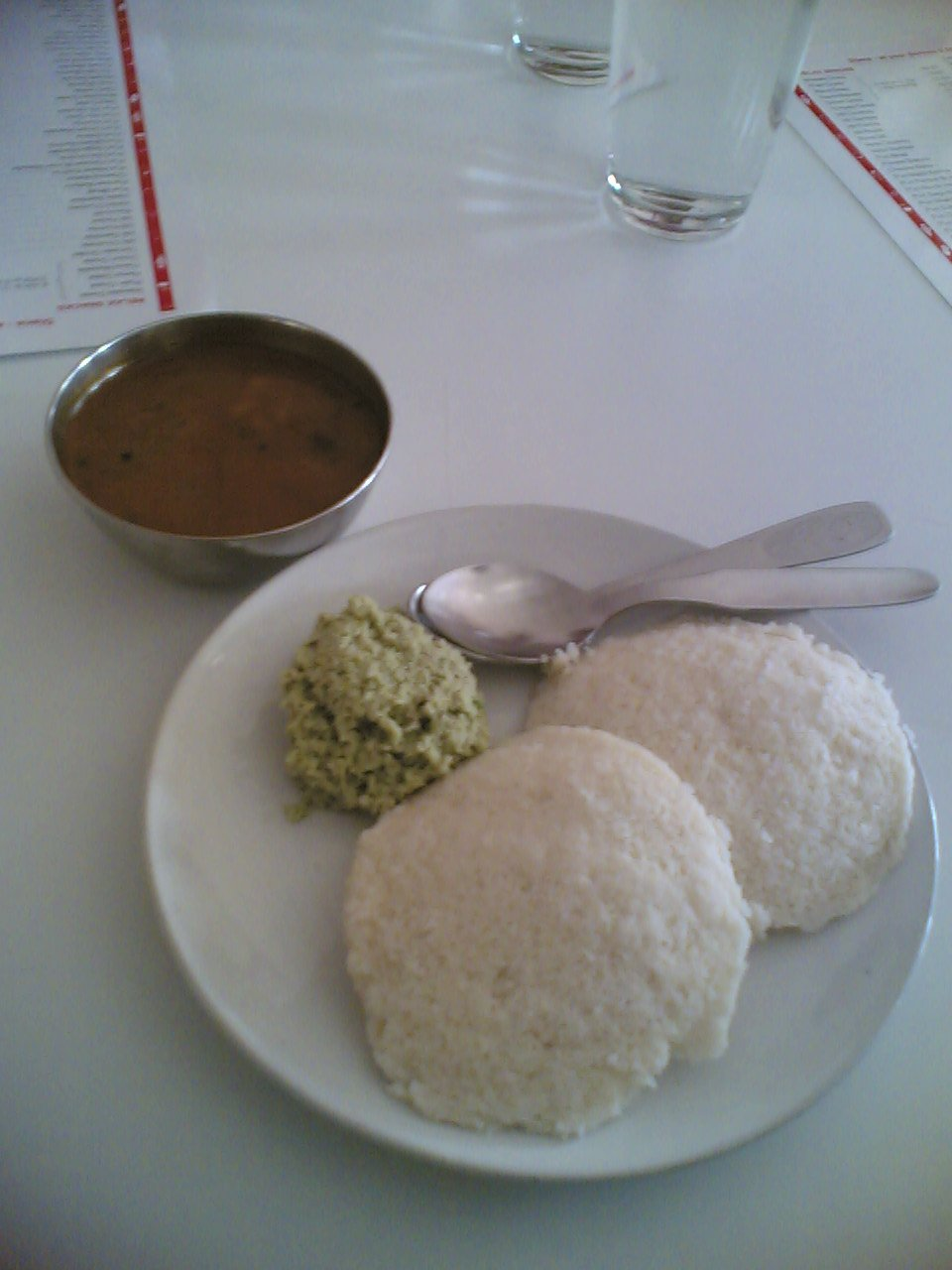
Idli served in an Udupi restaurant

== See also ==
- Cuisine of Karnataka
- Bengali cuisine
- Mavalli Tiffin Room
- New Woodlands Hotel
