= Mavalli Tiffin Rooms =

Indian restaurant and catering company

Mavalli Tiffin Rooms (MTR)
- Official logo of MTR

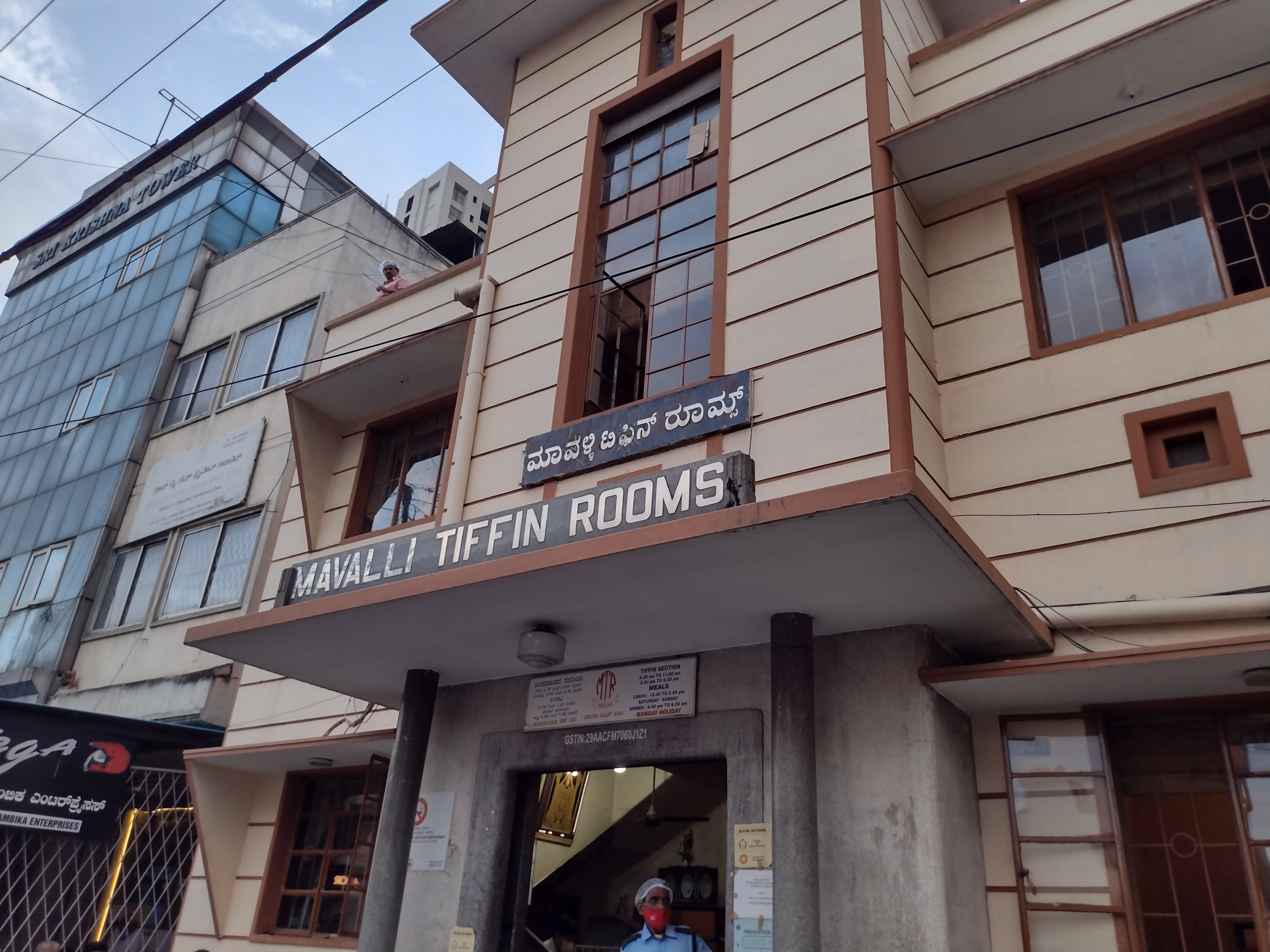
- MTR hotel at Lal Bagh road, in 2021
- Formerly: Brahmin Coffee Club
- Type: Private
- Industry: Food
- Founded: 1924
- Founder: Parampalli Yagnanarayana Maiya and Brothers
- Fate: Managed by members of the founding family
- Headquarters: Bengaluru, Karnataka, India
- Number of locations: 17
- Area served: Statewide, Singapore, Dubai, Kuala Lumpur, London, Seattle
- Key people: Parameshwara Maiya; Ganappayya Maiya; Parampalli Yagnanarayana Maiya; Parampalli Sadananda Maiya; Harishchandra Maiya
- Products: Food
- Services: Food
- Subsidiaries: MTR Foods
- Website: www.mavallitiffinrooms.com

Map showing Mavalli Tiffin Room, Lalbagh Road, Bengaluru, Karnataka

The Mavalli Tiffin Rooms (MTR) is the brand name of a food-related enterprise in India. Having its origin as a mess located on Lal Bagh road in Bengaluru, it has ten other branches in Bangalore, as well as in other Indian cities and overseas locations. MTR is also known to popularize South Indian breakfast items, rava idli.

MTR at Saint Mark's road, Bengaluru (2026)

MTR artifact at Republic day flower show, Lal Bagh, in 2025

== History ==
The restaurant started as Brahmin Coffee Club in Lalbagh Road area of Bangalore, India by Parampalli Yagnanarayana Maiya and his brothers in the year 1924. The restaurant moved to a new location in 1960 and was renamed as Mavalli Tiffin Rooms.

This restaurant was closed in the 1975 Indian emergency when the Food Control Act made it unprofitable to serve food items; It reopened in 1981.

To save the jobs during the time it was closed, MTR started selling spices and roasted flour mixes. That was the beginning of its entry into the convenience and instant food business that became MTR Foods.

== Cuisine and Innovation ==
MTR serves Karnataka Hindu food. For many years, customers entered the restaurant through the kitchen. During World War II, MTR found it difficult to make idlis since rice was in short supply. According to MTR, they experimented with semolina instead of rice and thus invented the breakfast item of Rava Idli.

== Management and Expansion ==
Maiya family continues to own and manage restaurant with 3rd generation of Maiya family, Hemamalini Maiya, Vikram Maiya, and Arvind Maiya, the grandchildren of Yagnanarayana Maiya.

MTR restaurant outside bangalore can be found in Udupi, Mysore, Singapore, Kuala Lumpur, London, Bellevue, Mississauga and Dubai.

It has been shown on television in the global travel-related series Globe Trekker. The restaurant building comprises two floors.

MTR, Bengaluru
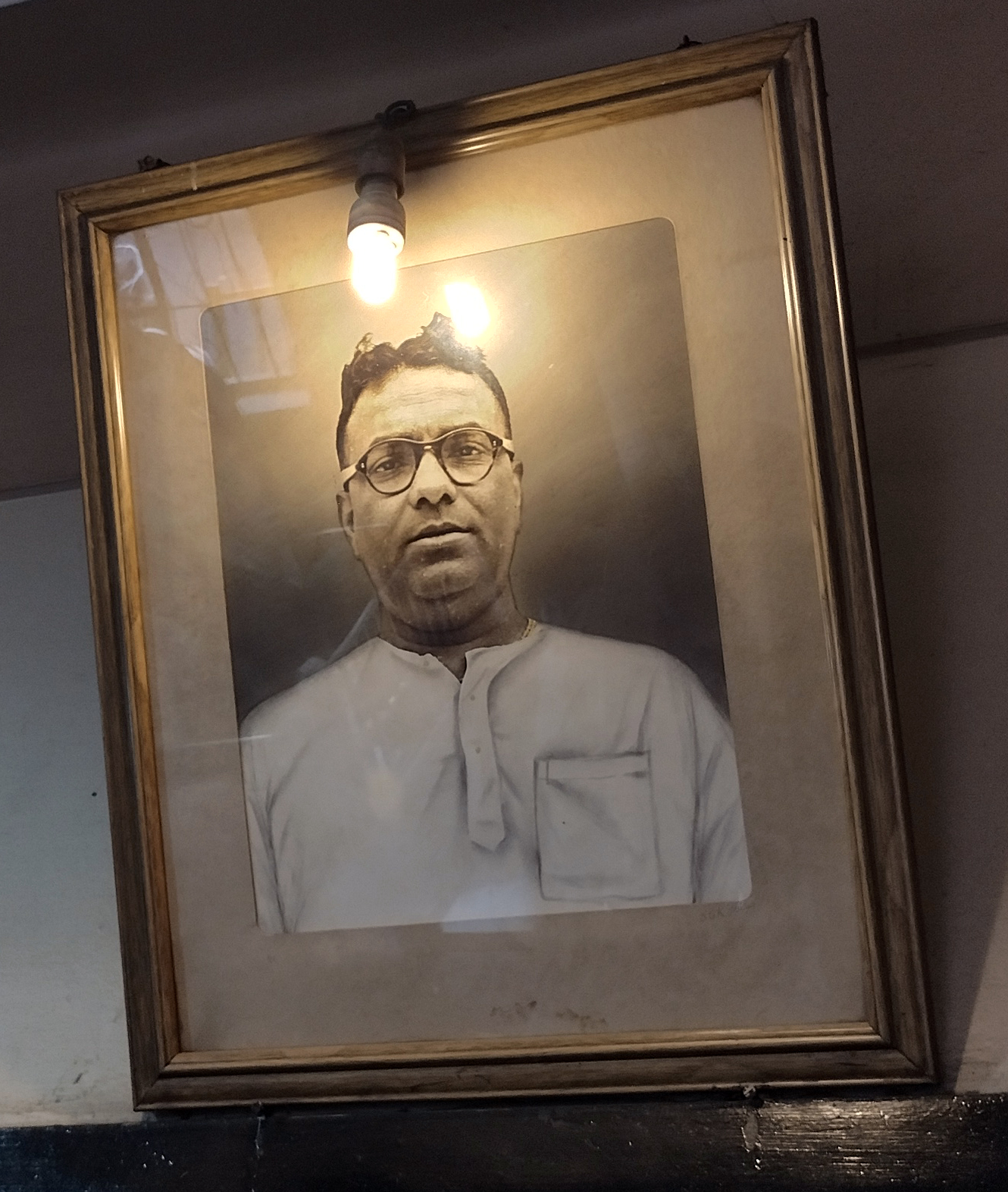
Founder of the restaurant, Parampalli Yagnanarayana Maiya

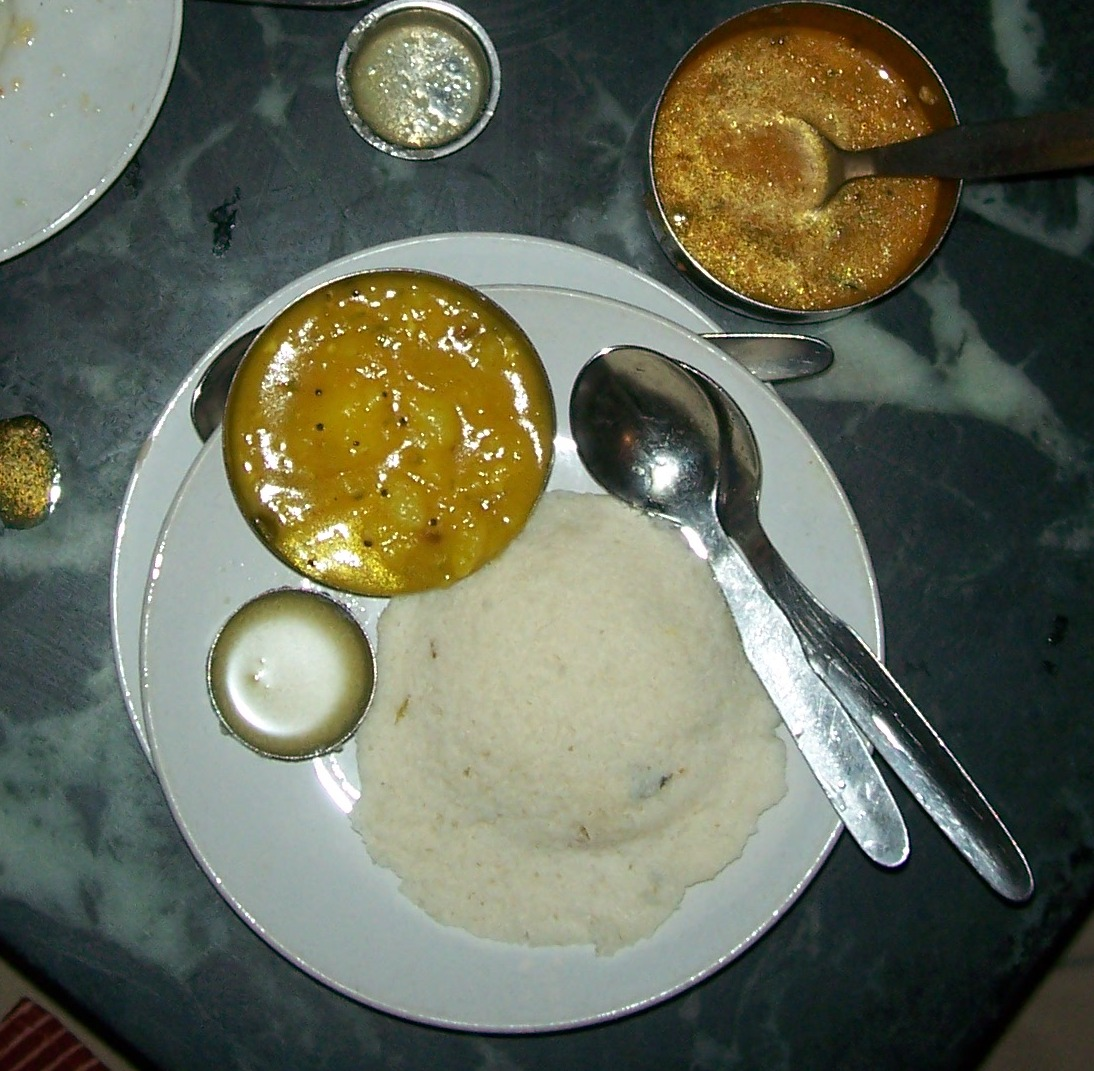
Idli served with pure ghee and sambar

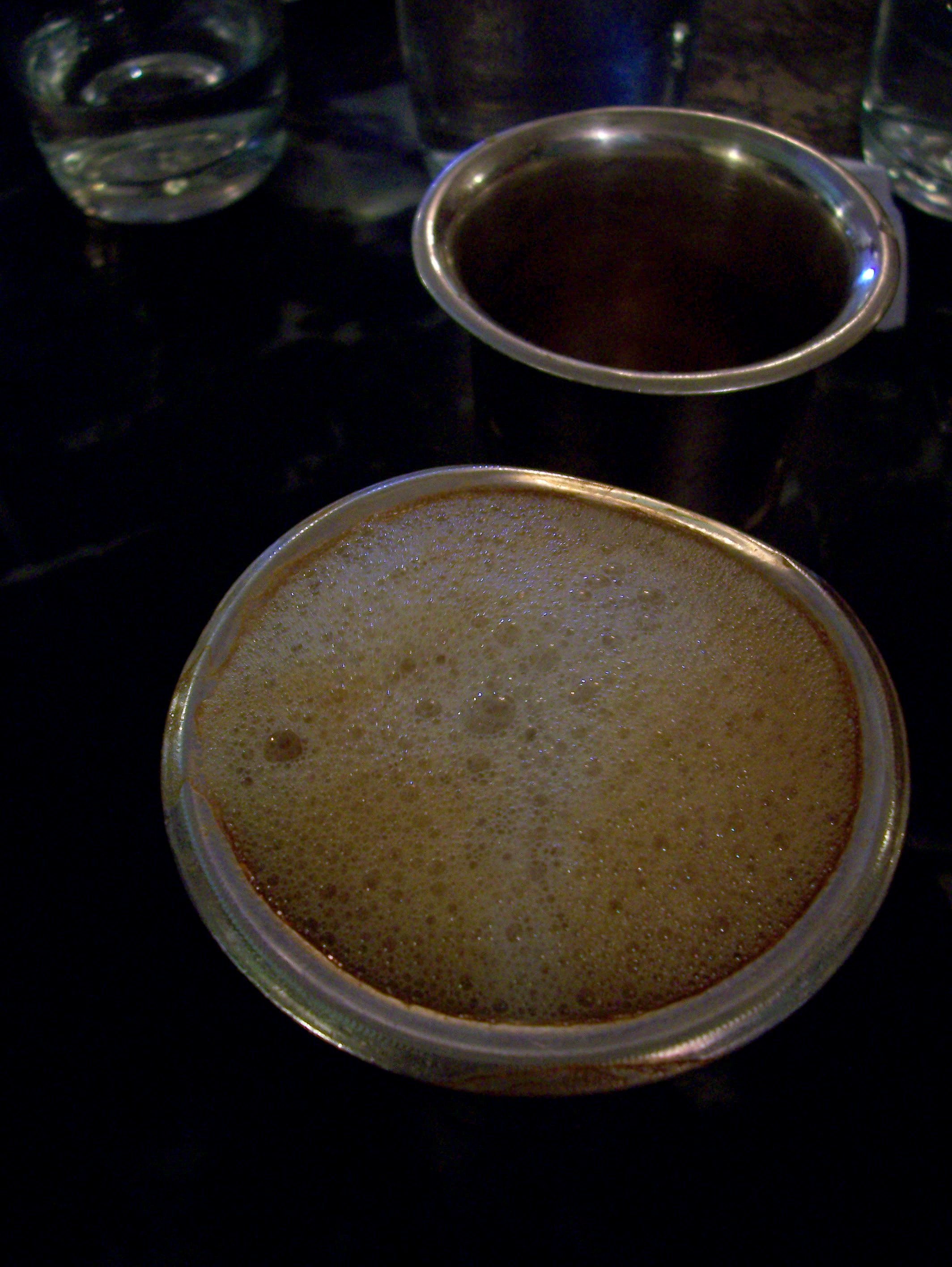
The MTR coffee served hot in silver coffee cups

== MTR Foods ==
In the 1970s, when India was under emergency, a Food Control Act was introduced in 1975 which mandated that food was to be sold at very low prices. This move made it difficult for MTR to maintain high standards in its restaurant business and forced it to diversify into the instant food business, selling ready-to-eat snacks such as chutneys and rasams. Since then, MTR has expanded and diversified, with MTR Department Stores opened next to the restaurant. Currently the MTR brand represents two separate entities; the MTR restaurant business and MTR Foods, the pre-packaged food business.

MTR Foods was headed by Sadananda Maiya (son of Yagnanarayana Maiya) until it was sold to Orkla, a Norwegian company for US$80 Million in March 2007. It produces packaged foods in different ranges - spices, instant mixes, ready-to-eat foods, vermicelli, beverages, ready-to-cook gravies, a range of frozen products, papads, pickles, chips, snacks and ice creams. After the Kargil War, a lot of changes happened in the packaged ready-to-eat food segment due to Defence Food Research Laboratory (DFRL). It bought the packaging technology from the same DFRL in Mysore and there are no preservatives added to the food while packaging. MTR is the first Indian processed foods company to be Hazard analysis and critical control points (HACCP)-certified, a standard of food safety and hygiene. It has also sponsored magic shows and theatre performances and given free samples to the audience, as a means of demonstrating their products. MTR Foods created a frozen dosa, which can be heated and eaten right away. MTR Food products are sold online and exported to the countries in the Persian Gulf, the United States, and the United Kingdom.

== See also ==
- Cuisine of Karnataka
- Udupi cuisine
- Tiffin
- Rava idli
