= Feni =

Feni may refer to:

== Places ==
- Feni District, a district of Chittagong Division, Bangladesh
  - Feni, Bangladesh, the capital city of Feni District
  - Feni Government Pilot High School, a secondary school in Feni, Bangladesh
  - Feni Sadar Upazila, an Upazila of Feni District
- Feni River, a river in Bangladesh and India
- Feni Islands, an island group in Papua New Guinea

== People ==
- Dumile Feni (1942–1991), South African artist
- Gagame Feni (born 1992), Solomon Islands footballer
- Feni Rose (born 1973), Indonesian TV presenter and entrepreneur

== Other ==
- Feni (liquor), a spirit produced in Goa, India
- KK Feni Industries, a professional basketball club based in Kavadarci, Republic of Macedonia
- Iron–nickel alloy, sometimes abbreviated FeNi

== See also ==
- Pheni (disambiguation)
- Fény, Hungarian spelling of Foeni, a Romanian commune
