= Mangalore buns =

Indian deep-fried bun

Mangalore Buns
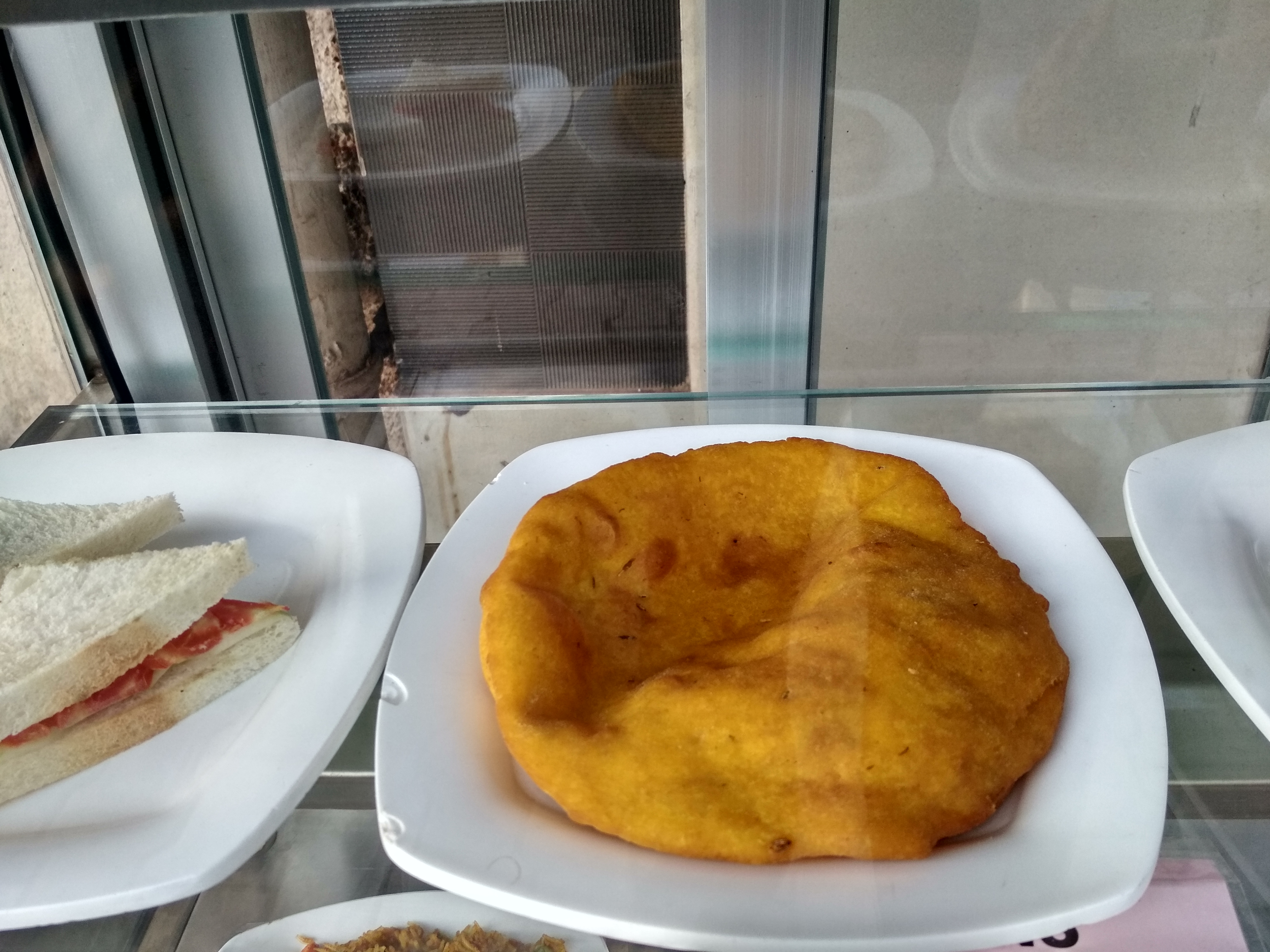
- Mangalore buns
- Place of origin: Mangalore-Udupi, Karnataka, India
- Region or state: Karnataka(Tulunad/South Canara region)
- Main ingredients: Banana, all purpose flour

Mangalore Buns is a deep-fried bread originating from the Udupi-Mangalore region of Karnataka, India, and part of Mangalorean cuisine or Udupi cuisine. The buns are mildly sweet, soft and fluffy puri-like deep-fried bread, primarily made of all purpose flour and banana.

On the origins of this Mangalore staple, legend has it that a Temple cook did not want the bananas offered by the devotees to get spoilt. So he gathered the ripe bananas, mashed them up, mixed it with dough, fried them up and offered them as Prasad to the devotees.

Usually served with a spicy coconut chutney and sambar, they are also eaten without any accompaniment.

Variations of this dish also incorporate finger millet and Sorghum.
