= Chirote =

Indian dessert

Chirote Peni
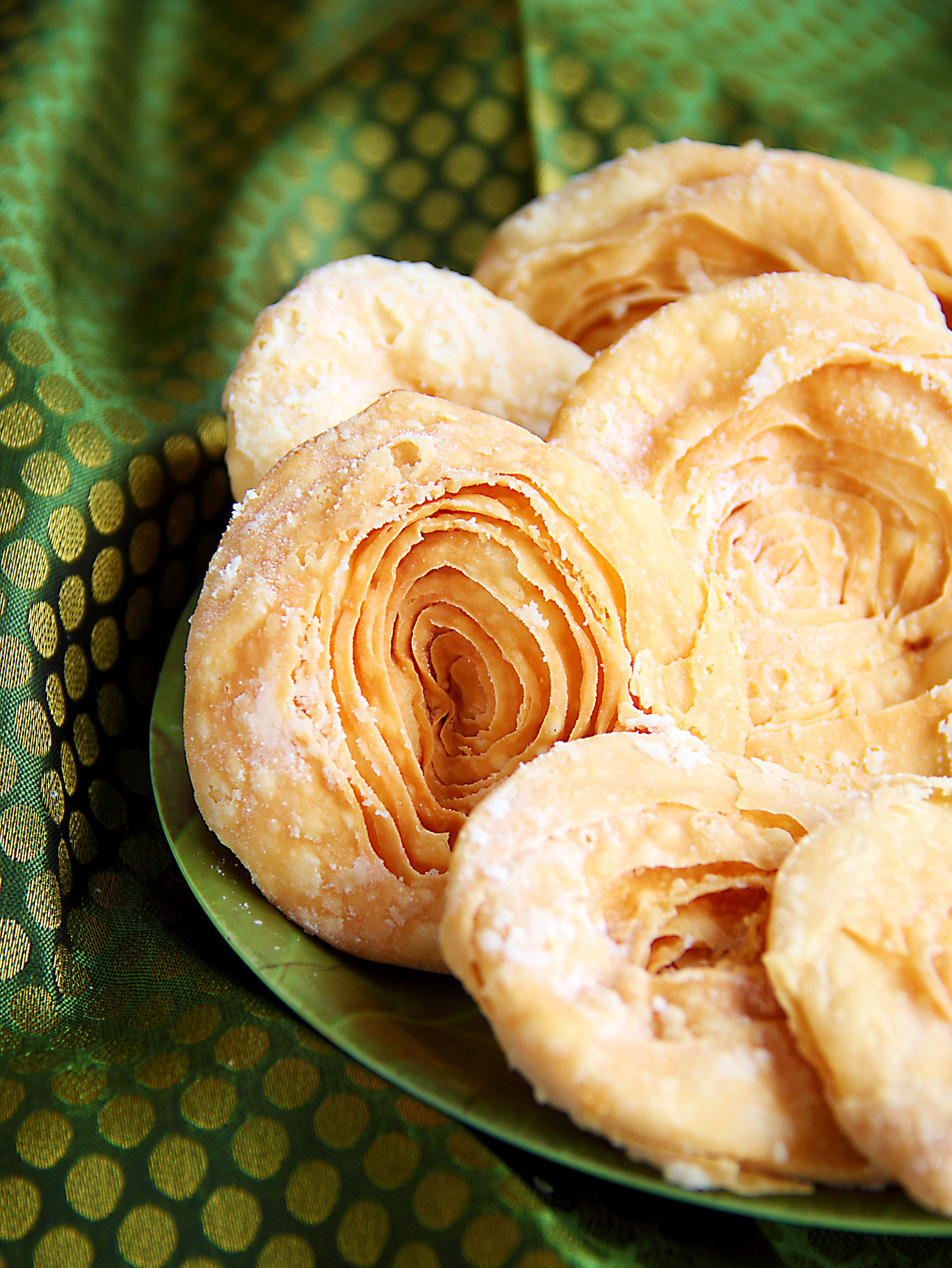
- Alternative names: Cheeroti
- Type: Indian dessert
- Place of origin: India
- Region or state: Maharashtra, Karnataka, and Telangana
- Main ingredients: Maida, sugar, ghee

Chirote (sometimes chiroti or cheeroti; also called pheni or peni) is a delicacy predominantly served in Maharashtra and former Bombay State areas in Karnataka. It is also famous in parts of Telangana state, especially in the district of Nalgonda where it is known by the name peni. It is served as a dessert on special occasions such as a festival or a wedding.

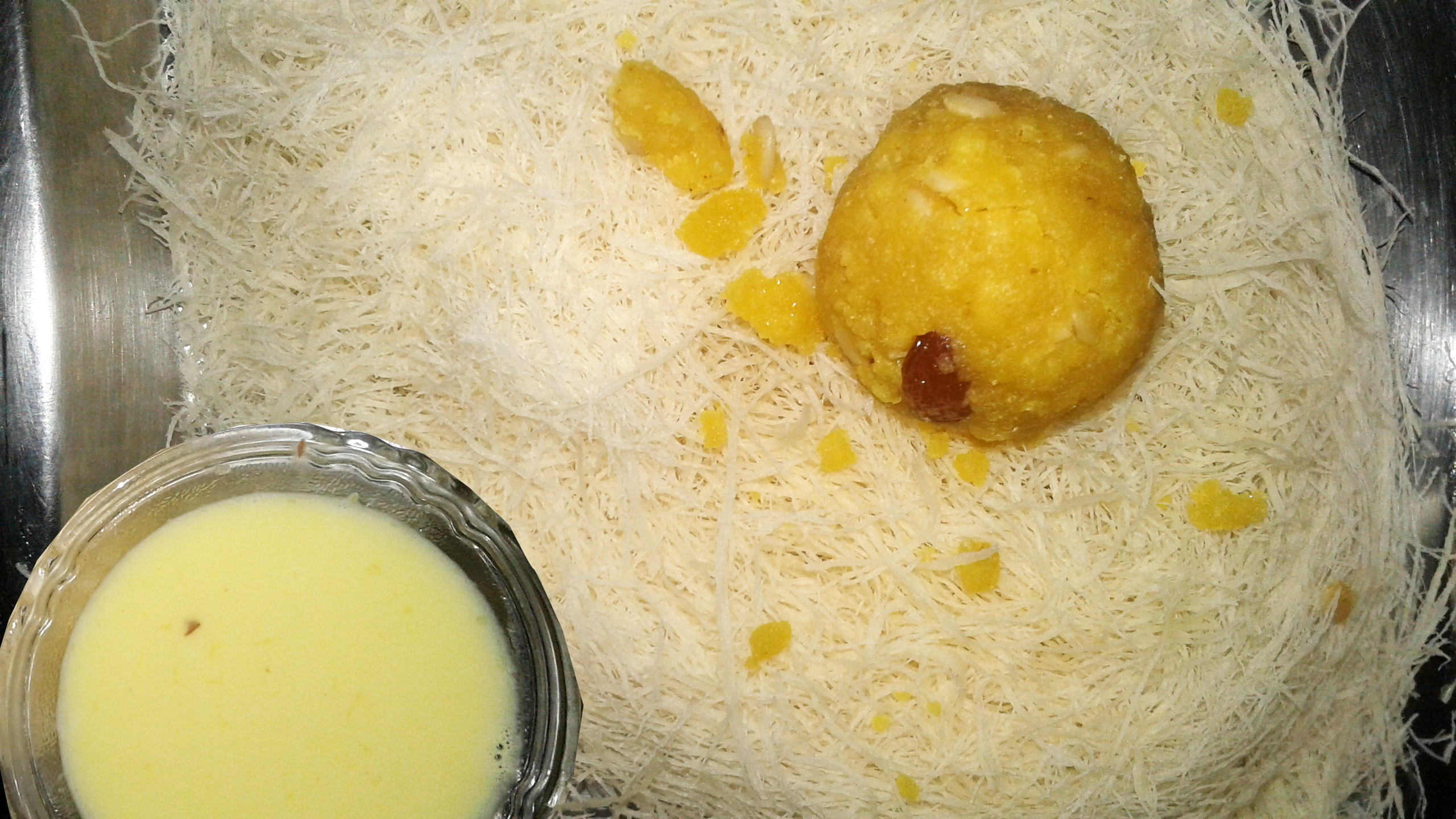
Semolina based pheni laadu and badam milk, karnataka sweet dish

== Preparation ==
It's prepared by rolling out kneaded dough made of maida into layered circular shapes and then deep frying in ghee or refined oil. The outcome resembles a semi golden brown fluffy poori, which is then sprinkled liberally with powdered sugar and optionally grated almonds and cashew. Chirote is served by adding sweetened milk over it.

== See also ==
- List of fried dough foods
- List of Indian dishes
