= Valla Sadhya =

Celebration in Kerala, India

Valla Sadhya Video

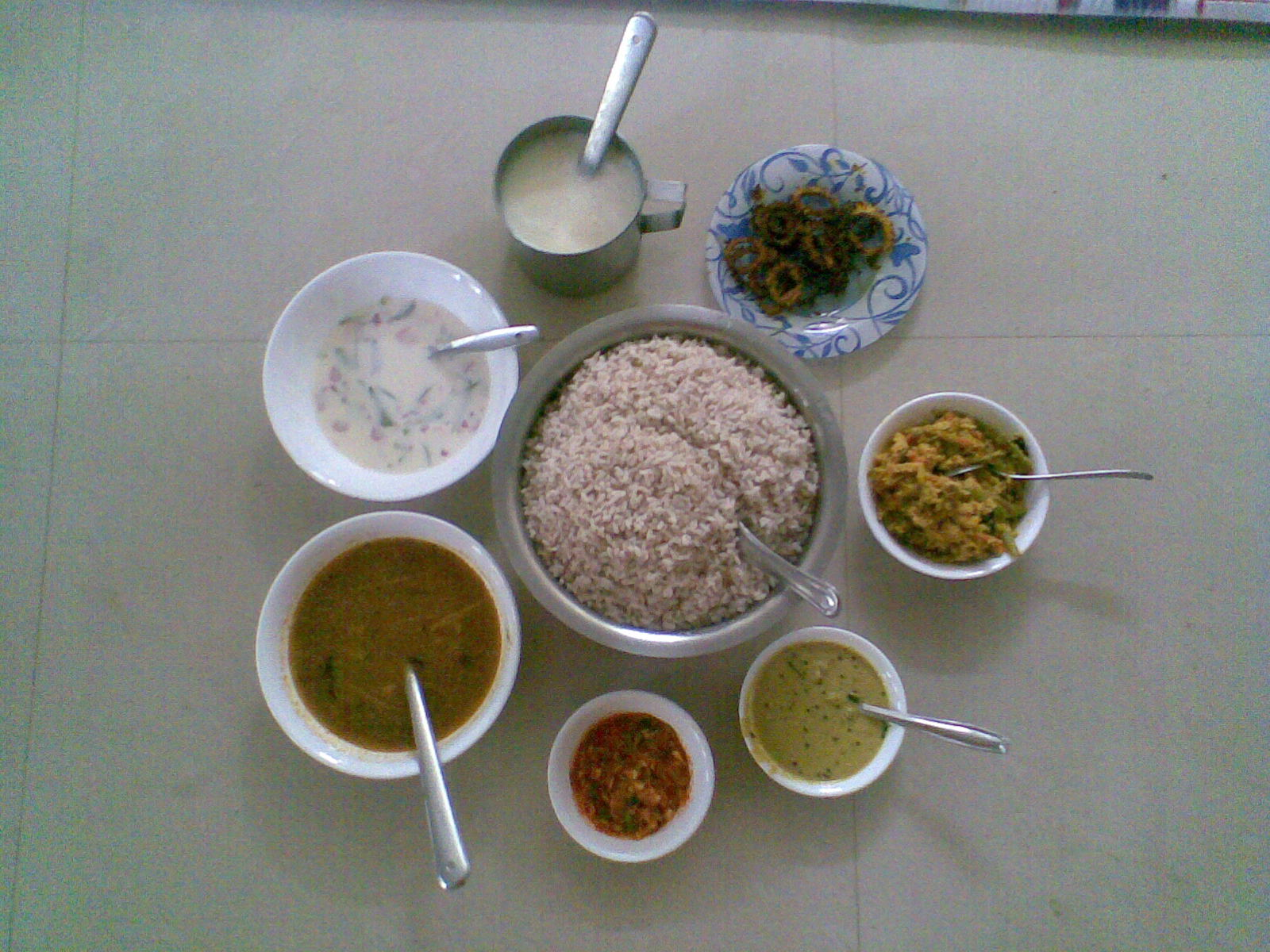
Sadya items ready to be served, clockwise from top: paayasam, bittergourd thoran, aviyal, kaalan, lime pickle, sambar; buttermilk with boiled rice in the center

Valla Sadya is a celebration in the Hindu temple at Aranmula, Kerala, India. During the festival, the village conducts a snake boat race in the Pampa River, and there is a feast at the temple. The Valla Sadhya is conducted on Ashtamirohoni day. During Valla Sadhya, Krishna, the main deity worshipped in the temple, will come to take the offerings from people. The legend is that in a Valla Sadya all dishes asked for must be given to the people in order to please the lord.

== Common offerings ==
The sadya is a feast of vegetarian food of the ayurvedic tradition. Each meal consists of 10 to 20 dishes served on banana or plantain leaves, and up to 64 dishes on Ashtami Rohini Day, the birthday of Krishna.

Some of the dishes and foods include:

- Parippu - A thick lentil dish eaten with rice, papadum and ghee
- Pulisserry - Curry prepared with thick and sour buttermilk
- Banana chips
- Shakara varatti and poovan palam
- Aravana payasam. (Pudding made from rice, jaggery and ghee)
- Kaalipazham payasam (Pudding made of banana)
- Unniappam
- Sambar
- Rasam
- Aviyal
- Kaalan
- Olan
- Koottukari
- Kichadi
- Pachadi
- Injipuli
- Thoran
- Achar: Spicy pickled raw mango, lemon, or lime

== Valla Sadhya ==
Valla sadya is conducted by the devotees as a "Vazhipadu" to Parthasarathy (another name for Krishna). The Valla sadya is dedicated to any boat. On the Valla sadya day, the oarsmen will come to the Temple in the boat through the river. The oarsmen offer Nirapara to the presiding deity at the Nadappanthal in front of the gold-plated temple mast and go around the temple chanting Krishna bhajans (Vanchi pattu). The entire atmosphere is charged with the rhythmic Vanchi pattu, songs in praise of Parthasarathy. The vallasadya begins immediately after the uccha pooja (noon worship) at the temple. They circumambulate the temple, chanting the vanchi pattu, verses in praise of Krishna, before partaking of the Valla sadya.

On the day of Krishna's birthday, the Ashtami Rohini day, the Valla sadya is conducted for all the devotees of Parthasarathy. Around one to two lakh people attend this event every year. Most of the palliyodams attend this feast.

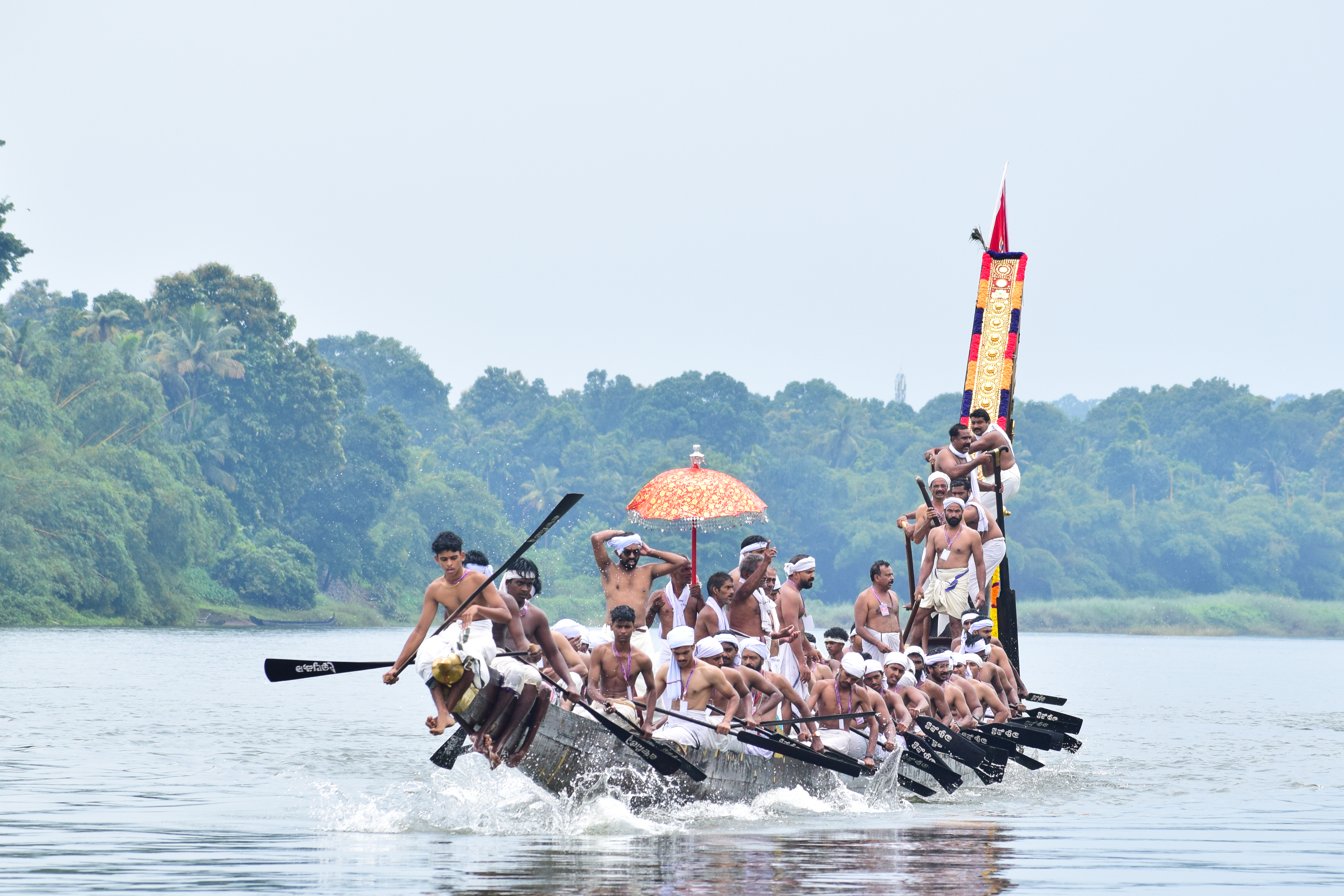
Gliding through the Pampa River, the Palliodam from Melukkara heads towards the Aranmula Parthasarathy temple to receive the offerings of devotees, and attend the Vallasdhya.

== Events ==
During the Kerala floods in 2018, the temple remained open for the celebration and 92 offerings were performed. In 2020 and 2021, due to the COVID-19 pandemic, restrictions affected how it could be conducted.

== See also ==
- Aranmula
- Palliyodam
- Snake boat
- Aranmula Boat Race
- Trivandrum Sadhya
