= List of banana dishes of Kerala =

Dishes of Kerala made with banana or plantain

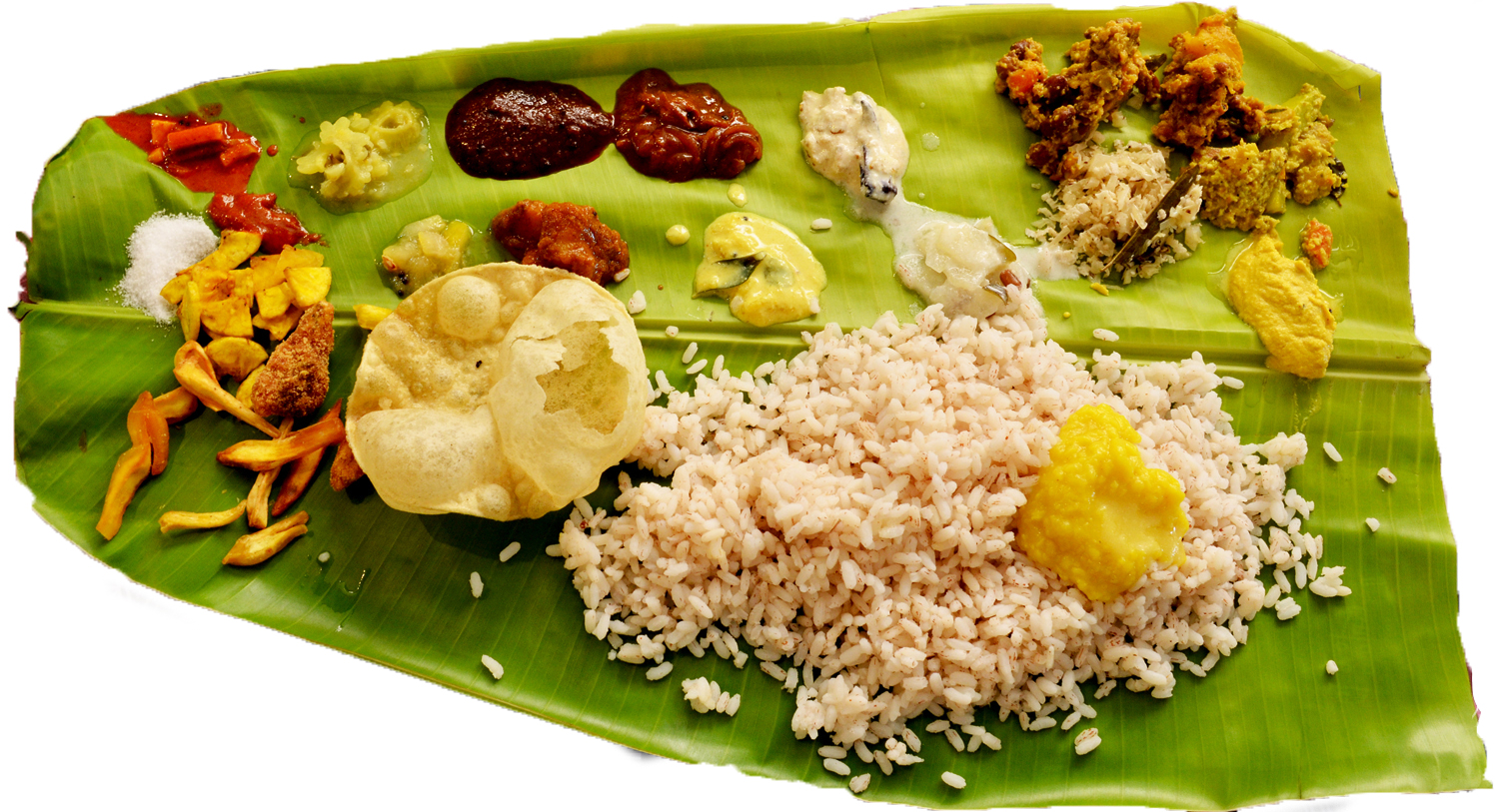
A Kerala sadya containing many banana-based dishes

This is a list of banana dishes of Kerala, India where the banana and the plantain are everyday foods. The leaf, flower and stem of the plant are also cooked in Kerala, and the leaf is used as a plate.

Banana-based dishes have a prominent place in Onam sadya served in Kerala. Salted banana wafers and jaggery-coated upperi are laid at the bottom left of the leaf with the pappadam and a small ripe banana before the curries are served. Unripe Nendran banana goes into the chips and into curries such as kaalan, erissery and kootu curry. Bunches of banana are also offered at temples during Onam as kazhchakkula, the Chengalikodan variety of banana from Thrissur is the variety most sought after for the purpose.

In Malabar ripe banana is commonly used in the snacks eaten at iftar during Ramadan. Pazham nirachathu, ripe Nendran stuffed with coconut and dried fruit and unnakai are staple items served during ifthar.

== List ==
Dish	Also known as	Type	Description
Banana chips	Upperi, kaya varuthathu, ethakka upperi	Snack	Unripe Nendran banana sliced into thin rounds, fried in coconut oil and salted. A component of Onam sadya.
Banana halwa		Dessert	A halwa cooked from banana with flour, ghee, sugar and cashew nuts, flavoured with cardamom.
Erissery		Side dish	Sliced plantain cooked with pumpkin, elephant foot yam and beans in a ground coconut base. A sadya dish in which yam and plantain are the lead ingredients.
Kaalan	Kurukku kaalan	Side dish	Raw plantain and elephant foot yam simmered in sour curd thickened with ground coconut, pepper and fenugreek. Served at sadya and other festive meals.
Kaya mezhukkupuratti	Kai mezhukkupiratti	Side dish	Unripe plantain cut small and stir-fried with crushed shallots, chilli and curry leaves in coconut oil.
Kaikritha		Sweet snack	A North Kerala sweet made by scrambling banana in ghee with egg, sugar and cardamom, given to pregnant women.
Kaya attirachi curry		Meat curry	A Thalassery dish of raw banana cooked with goat leg and coconut, eaten with ghee rice or steamed rice.
Kaya pola		Snack	A Malabar cake of ripe banana with egg, sugar, ghee, cashew nuts, raisins and cardamom.
Koottukari	Kootu curry	Side dish	Raw banana cooked with chickpeas, coconut and green chilli. On the sadya leaf the dish combines elephant foot yam, plantain and ash gourd.
Kumbilappam	Ethapazham kumbilappam	Steamed sweet	Ripe banana mixed with roasted rice flour, grated coconut and jaggery, then steamed in a rolled leaf cone. Usually made with jackfruit, and with banana in its place when jackfruit is out of season.
Panchasara varatti		Festive snack	Thick slices of raw banana fried crisp and then coated in a sugar syrup with crushed cardamom. Made at Christmas alongside sharkara varatti.
Pazham ada		Snack	Ripe Palayankodan banana with jaggery, rice flour and grated coconut, spiced with cardamom, dry ginger and cumin.
Pazham nanachathu		Dessert	A Syrian Christian sweet of sun-dried ripe banana mixed with fresh coconut and paani, palm toddy reduced over a wood fire to the consistency of honey.
Pazham nirachathu		Snack	Ripe Nendran banana split lengthways and stuffed with grated coconut, cardamom and dried fruit, or with egg, then coated and fried. An iftar staple in Malabar.
Pazham nurukku		Breakfast	Pieces of Nendran banana steamed and then roasted in ghee, or simmered in coconut milk with jaggery. Eaten at Onam in central Kerala and as a Thiruvonam breakfast in Malabar.
Pazham pradhaman	Nendran pazham payasam	Dessert	A payasam of ripe banana cooked in coconut milk with jaggery, served at feasts.
Pazham pulissery		Side dish	Ripe banana in a turmeric and buttermilk gravy ground with coconut, cumin and fenugreek, served at sadya.
Pazham varattiyathu		Dessert	Rounds of ripe Nendran banana cooked down with jaggery, grated coconut, cardamom and dry ginger.
Pazhampori	Ethakka appam, pazham pori	Snack	Lengthways slices of ripe Nendran banana dipped in a flour batter and deep fried, sold at tea shops and bakeries across the state. Nendran banana is used because it stays firm in the pan and sweetens as it ripens without turning to mush.
Pork with kaya ularthiyathu		Meat side dish	Pork cooked with thick sheets of boiled raw banana, onion, ginger, garlic and garam masala.
Pulikuthi kaya		Curry	A Palakkad preparation of raw plantain cooked with tamarind, jaggery, split chickpeas and toor dal.
Sarkkarappazham		Dessert	Banana cooked with grated coconut and jaggery, finished with ghee, cashew nuts, raisins and cardamom.
Sharkarapuratti	Sharkara upperi, Sharkara varatti	Snack	Wedges of unripe Nendran banana fried crisp in coconut oil and then coated in jaggery syrup with dry ginger and cardamom. Served on the sadya leaf next to the salted chips.
Unnakai	Unnakaya, kai porichathu	Fried sweet	Steamed and mashed Nendran banana wrapped around a filling of grated coconut, cardamom, sugar and raisins, shaped into a spindle and deep fried. A Malabar iftar and wedding snack.
Unni appam	Unniyappam	Fried sweet	Small round snack made from rice, jaggery, banana, roasted coconut pieces, roasted sesame seeds, ghee and cardamom powder fried in oil.
Vaari itathu		Snack	A North Kerala snack made by mixing banana with maida, sugar, salt and water.

Raw plantain is also one of the vegetables in avial, the mixed vegetable dish that marks a sadya out from an ordinary meal, though it is not the main ingredient there.

== See also ==
- Kerala cuisine
- List of banana dishes
- List of Indian dishes
