= Trivandrum sadhya =

Trivandrum sadhya or Thiruvananthapuram sadhya (/ˈtɪrʊvəndrəm ˈsʌdjə/ Malayalam pronunciation: [t̪iruʋɐnɐn̪d̪ɐˈsɐd̪jɐ]) is a traditional vegetarian feast that holds significant cultural importance in Thiruvananthapuram, the capital of Kerala. Sadhya is eaten across Kerala, and the Trivandrum sadhya is known for its distinct combination of dishes and flavors. This meal is typically served during major festivals like Onam and Vishu, as well as at weddings and temple celebrations.

Served on a banana leaf, the Trivandrum sadhya typically features tastes from tangy and spicy to sweet and savory. Trivandrum sadhya often includes distinct items like Trivandrum boli, a sweet flatbread, and paalpayasam, a creamy rice pudding that serves as the dessert. The sadhya is often seen as an expression of hospitality and community.

== Cultural significance ==
In Thiruvananthapuram, the sadhya is an integral part of cultural and social gatherings. The tradition of serving food on a banana leaf reflects Kerala's agricultural practices and symbolizes hospitality.

== Components of Trivandrum sadhya ==
The Trivandrum sadhya consists of a variety of dishes, many of which are common to the state, though certain preparations are unique to the capital city. The meal typically follows a set order, with rice being the central element accompanied by a series of side dishes. Key components of the Trivandrum sadhya include:

Trivandrum Sadhya
Malayalam Name	English name	Description
ഇഞ്ചിപുളി	Injipuli (Tamarind Sweet-Sour Curry)	A tangy and slightly sweet curry made with tamarind, jaggery, and spices. Served as a small accompaniment.
നാരങ്ങ അച്ചാർ	Lemon Pickle	Preserved lemon with spices, adds tangy flavor to the meal.
മാങ്ങ അച്ചാർ	Mango Pickle	Spiced preserved mango, commonly served with rice.
പച്ച beetroot kichadi	Beetroot Pachadi	Yogurt-based dish with beetroot, mildly sweet and sour.
പൈനാപ്പിൾ പച്ചടി	Pineapple Pachadi	Sweet-sour yogurt dish made with pineapple and coconut.
തോരൻ	Thoran	Stir-fried vegetables with grated coconut and spices.
അവിയൽ	Avial	Mixed vegetables cooked in coconut and yogurt, seasoned with curry leaves.
കൂട്ടുകരി	Kootu Curry	Vegetable and lentil curry with coconut paste, moderately spiced.
ഓലൻ	Olan	Curry made with white pumpkin, cowpeas, and coconut milk, mildly seasoned.
തീയൽ	Theeyal	Roasted coconut-based curry with tamarind, giving a dark brown color and rich flavor.
ചെമ്പാവ് ചോറു	Chempavu Choru (Red Rice)	Red rice or plain steamed rice served as the main staple.
പരിപ്പ് കറി	Lentil Curry	Simple dal (lentil) curry, often poured over rice with ghee.
നെയ്യ്	Ghee	Clarified butter added to rice for richness and flavor.
പുളിശ്ശേരി	Pulisseri	Sweet-sour yogurt curry, slightly different from Injipuli.
റസം	Rasam	Thin, tangy, spiced soup, often consumed with rice.
മോർ കറി	Mor Curry (Yogurt Curry)	Curry made with buttermilk or yogurt, mildly spiced.
തിരുവനന്തപുരം ബോളി	Trivandrum Boli	Sweet flatbread made with coconut and jaggery.
പരിപ്പ് പായസം	Parippu Payasam	Dessert made from lentils, jaggery, and coconut milk.
അടപ്പായസം	Ada Payasam	Dessert made from rice flakes cooked in milk and jaggery.
പാല്പായസം	Pal Payasam	Sweet rice pudding made with milk, rice, and sugar or jaggery.
Upperi	Upperi (Fried Snacks)	Banana chips or other fried snacks served as side items.
പഴം	Fruit	Banana served with the meal.
പപ്പടം	Pappadam	Crisp lentil wafer, fried or roasted, served as an accompaniment.

== Preparation and Serving ==
Each dish in the Trivandrum Sadhya is made separately using fresh, local ingredients. Traditional methods like slow cooking and grinding spices by hand are often employed. The meal is served on a banana leaf, with the dishes arranged in a specific order to ensure the balance of flavors. The Trivandrum Sadhya begins with rice and sambar, followed by a variety of vegetable dishes, and ends with the sweet dessert of Paalpayasam.

The Trivandrum Sadhya is an integral part of the cultural and culinary identity of Thiruvananthapuram. While it shares many components with other sadhyas across Kerala, the inclusion of unique dishes like Boli and Paalpayasam gives it a distinctive character.
