= Erissery =

Kerala dish

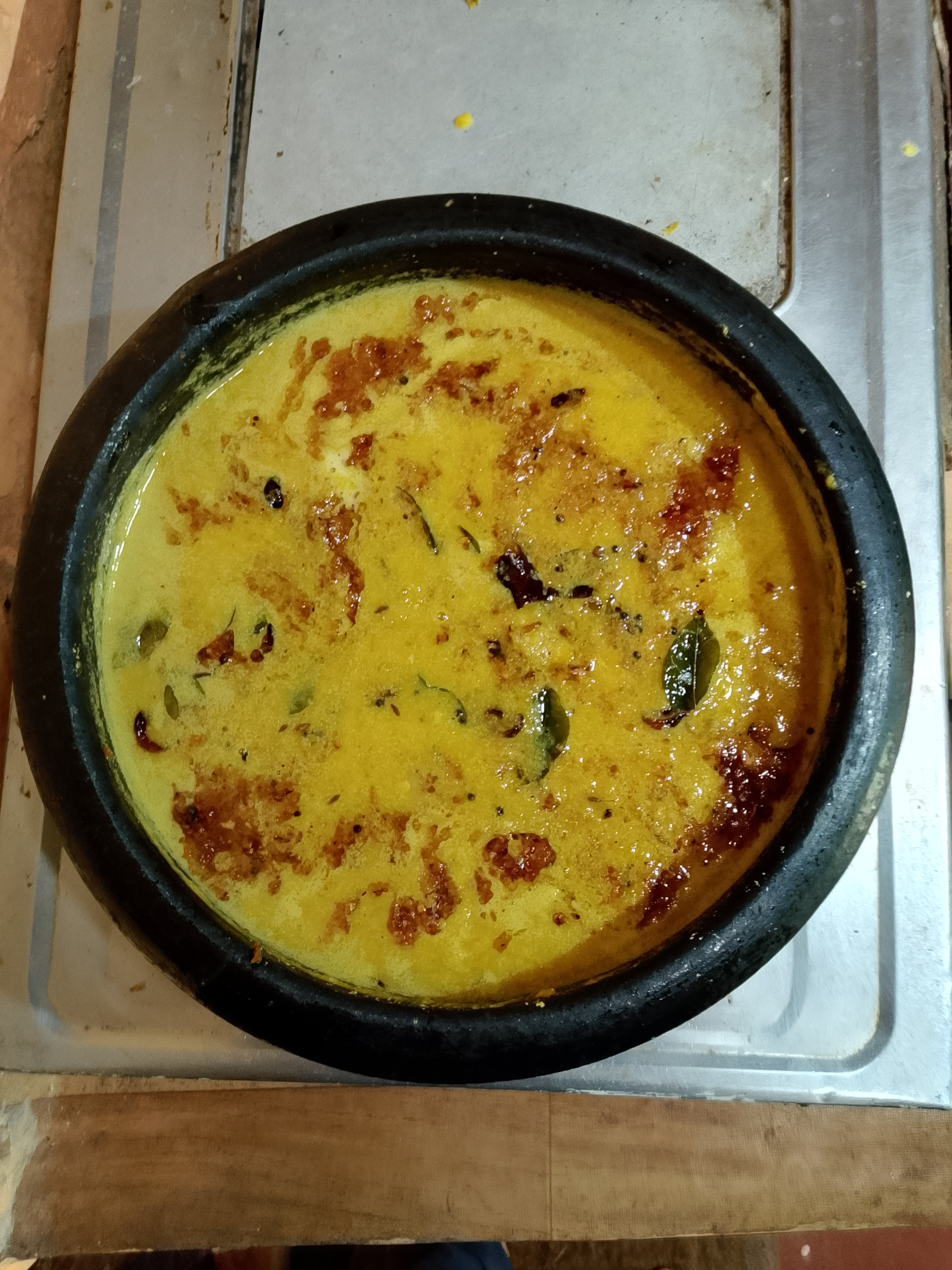
- An erissery preparation
- Alternative names: Mathanga Erissery
- Type: Curry
- Place of origin: India
- Region or state: Kerala
- Main ingredients: Yam or raw plantain, coconut, pepper

Erissery (Malayalam: എരിശ്ശേരി [eɾiːʃːeɾi]), is a traditional Kerala dish from South India, made with ground coconut, spices, and key ingredients include raw plantain, elephant-foot yam, or pumpkin. it is a thick, mild side dish classified as a koottukari. It is an essential component of the traditional Kerala sadya, the vegetarian feast served during festive occasions.

== Preparation ==
The primary vegetable—or a combination of main vegetable is chopped into cubes, then add cowpeas or red beans and boile this mixture with water, turmeric powder, and salt until tender.

A fine paste made of freshly grated coconut, garlic, cumin seeds, red chili powder, turmeric, and black pepper powder is stirred into the cooked vegetables. The mixture is simmered gently on low heat to allow the raw spice flavours to dissipate without letting excess moisture build up, ensuring a thick consistency.

The signature feature of Erissery is its final tempering. This is done with Mustard seeds, dry red chillies, and fresh curry leaves are fried in coconut oil alongside a generous amount of grated coconut. The coconut is toasted until deep golden brown and fragrant before being poured over the curry.

== Characteristics and variations ==
Unlike yoghurt-based curries such as Kaalan or Pulissery, Erissery derives its body and flavour entirely from ground and toasted coconut. It is notable for its mild, subtly sweet profile—particularly when prepared with pumpkin—contrasted by the aromatic, nuttiness of the toasted coconut topping.

Popular variations across Kerala include:

- Mathanga Erissery: Made with yellow pumpkin, often paired with red cowpeas (vanpayar).
- Kaya Erissery: Made with raw green plantains.
- Chena Erissery: Prepared using diced elephant-foot yam.
- Muringa Erissery: Prepared using diced elephant-foot yam, but adding Moringa leaf to it.

== Serving ==
Erissery is served warm as part of the sadya, placed on the lower half of the plantain leaf alongside other side dishes. It is a regular ingredient in the sadya served at major cultural festivals in Kerala, including Onam and Vishu.

== See also ==
- Cuisine of Kerala
- Sadya
- Kaalan
- Avial
