= Koottukar =

Koottukar may refer to these Indian films:

- Koottukar (1966 film), Malayalam film starring Prem Nazir and Sathyan
- Koottukar (2010 film), Malayalam film starring Vinu Mohan and Bhama

== See also ==
- Koottukari, an Indian dish
