= Pulissery =

Kerala curd-based curry

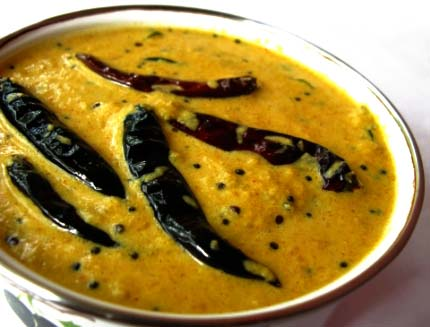
- Pulissery served in a bowl
- Alternative names: Pulisseri, Moru curry
- Type: Curry
- Place of origin: India
- Region or state: Kerala
- Associated cuisine: Kerala cuisine
- Main ingredients: Sour curd or buttermilk, coconut, cumin, turmeric, green chilli
- Similar dishes: Kadhi, Kaalan

Pulissery (also spelt pulisseri) is a curd- or buttermilk-based curry from the South Indian state of Kerala. It is made by combining sour yogurt or buttermilk with a ground paste of coconut, cumin, turmeric and green chilli, and is finished with a tempering of mustard seeds, fenugreek, dried red chilli and curry leaves. The curry has a mild, tangy taste and is usually eaten with rice. In several regions, it has variants, also called moru curry, meaning buttermilk curry. Pulissery is a common item in the sadya, the traditional Kerala vegetarian feast served on a banana leaf.

== Etymology ==
The name comes from the Malayalam word puli, which means sourness or tamarind. It refers to the tart flavour of the soured curd or buttermilk that forms the base of the dish.

== Preparation ==
Grated coconut is ground with cumin, turmeric and green chilli into a smooth paste. The paste is cooked, often along with a vegetable or fruit, until the raw taste of the coconut goes away. Sour curd or buttermilk is then stirred in and the curry is warmed gently. A common instruction is to add the curd near the end and not let the mixture boil afterwards, because boiling makes the yogurt curdle and split. The finished curry is tempered with coconut oil, mustard seeds, fenugreek, dried red chillies, shallots and curry leaves.

== Variants ==
Pulissery is prepared in many versions that differ by the vegetable or fruit cooked in the curd base. Common ones use ripe mango (mambazha pulissery), pineapple, ripe plantain or ash gourd (kumbalanga pulissery). Fruit-based versions such as mango and pineapple are sweet and sour, while the vegetable versions are milder. Regional preferences vary within Kerala, and in general, a diluted kaalan is preferred to pulissery in parts of the south, and an ash-gourd pulincurry is a favourite around Thalassery.
