= Sharkarapuratti =

Kerala snack

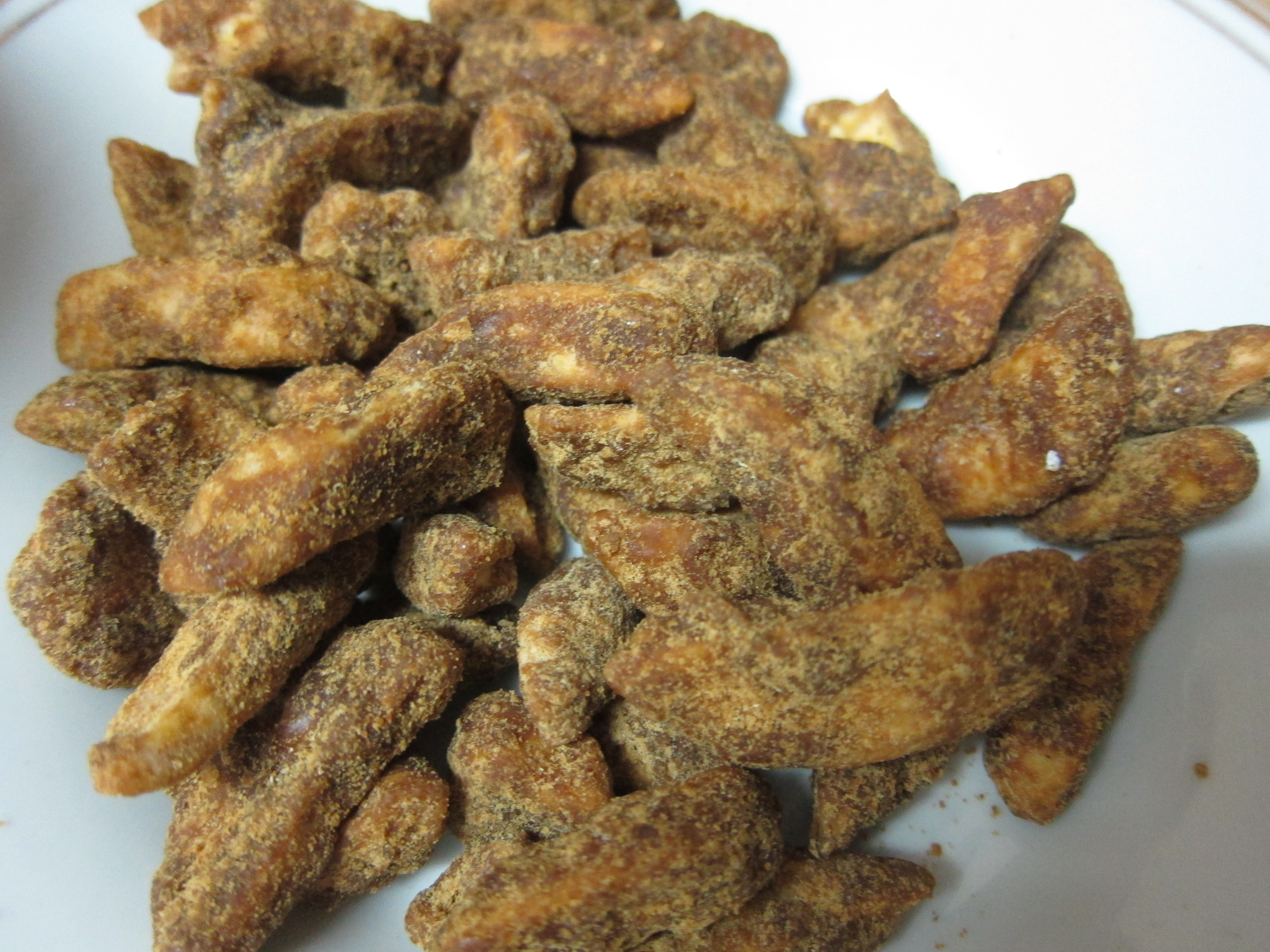
- Sharkarapuratti
- Alternative names: Sharkara varatti, Sharkara upperi
- Type: Sweet snack
- Course: Snack
- Place of origin: India
- Region or state: Kerala
- Main ingredients: Plantain, jaggery

Sharkarapuratti (Malayalam: ശർക്കരപുരട്ടി), also called sharkara varatti and sharkara upperi, is a sweet snack from Kerala, India, made by coating deep-fried pieces of plantain in melted jaggery (sharkara). It is one of the snacks of the Onam sadhya, the festival feast of Kerala.

== Preparation ==
Raw plantains are peeled, cut into pieces and deep-fried until crisp. Jaggery is melted and boiled down to a thick syrup, and the fried pieces are stirred through it until they are coated and the syrup sets. Dry ginger, cumin and cardamom go in for flavour, and a little roasted rice flour is dusted over the pieces so the coating does not stay sticky. Unlike ordinary salted banana chips, sharkarapuratti is coated in jaggery and eaten as a sweet.

== Sadhya ==
Sharkarapuratti is one of the fried snacks served at the sadhya, the banana-leaf feast of Onam. Because the jaggery coating sets hard once it cools, the pieces keep for several days in an airtight container.

== See also ==
- Banana chips
- Kerala cuisine
