= Mezhukkupuratti =

Vegetable side dish

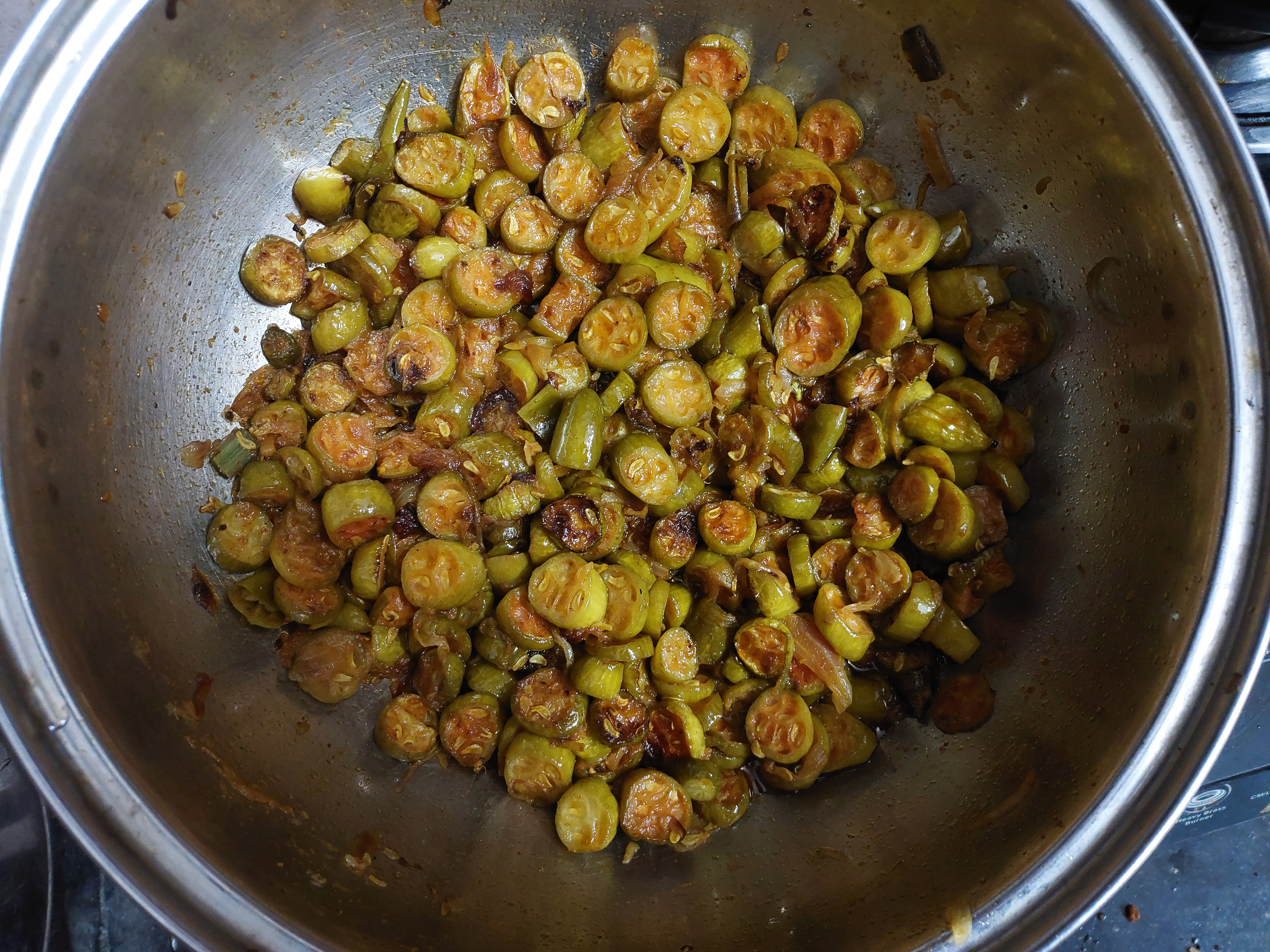
Kovakka mezhukkupuratti

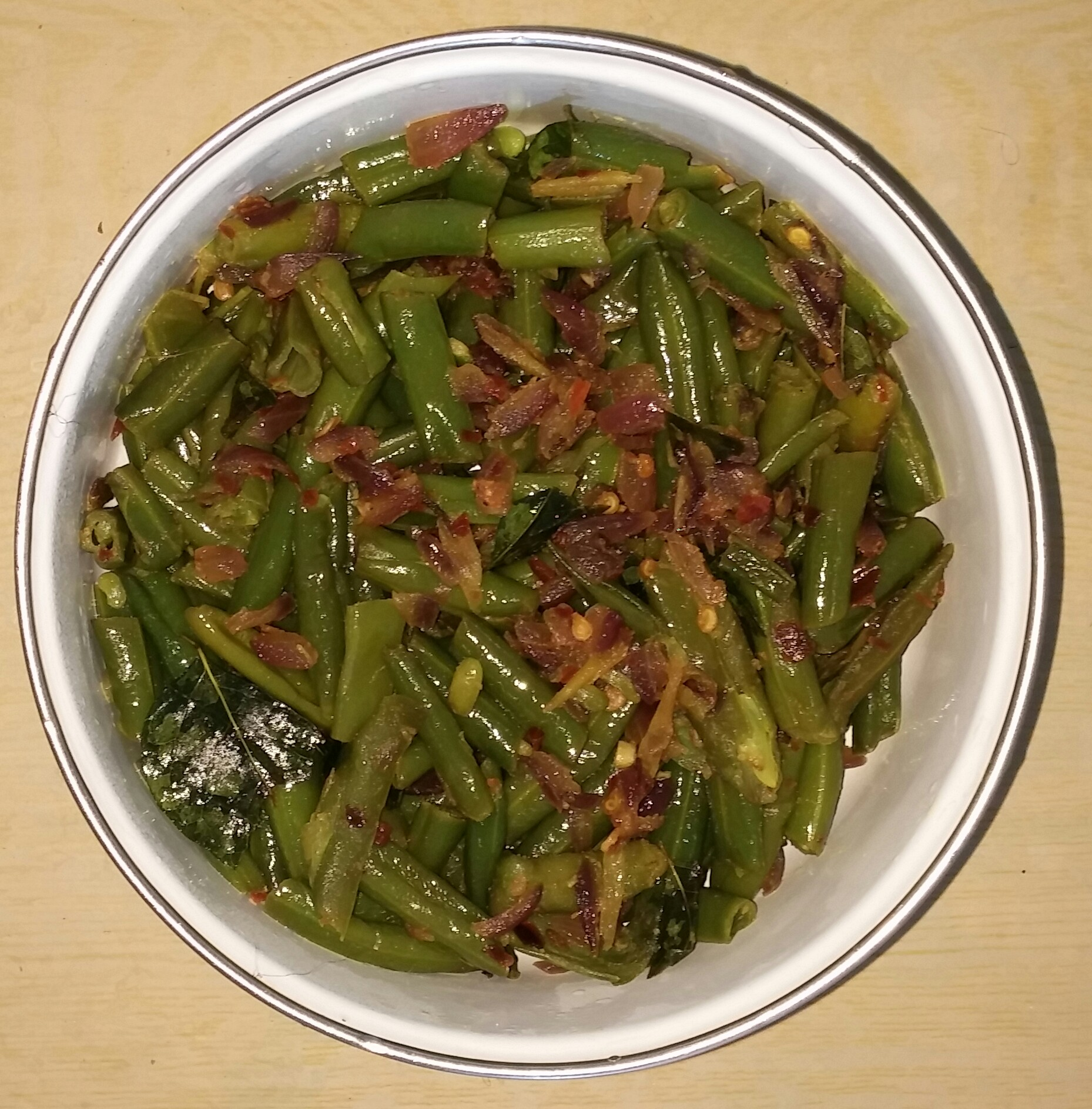
Beans mezhukkupuratti

Mezhukkupuratti is a dry vegetable side dish in Kerala cuisine. Pieces of a vegetable are tossed in oil with a few spices and cooked until they take on a glossy coating of oil, which is the sense the name carries. It is an everyday accompaniment to rice, and each version is named after the vegetable used, giving dishes such as kaya (raw plantain) and chena (elephant foot yam) mezhukkupuratti.

== Preparation ==
The vegetable is cut into pieces and cooked with turmeric and salt until it is just soft. Vegetables used include raw plantain, elephant foot yam, potato, Chinese potato and ivy gourd, and leafy greens are prepared the same way. In a separate pan, mustard seeds are tempered in coconut oil, after which shallots, garlic, curry leaves and dried red chillies go in, and the drained vegetable is added and sautéed until it is coated in the oil.

Some versions include grated coconut, such as the plantain recipe published by Kerala Tourism, while others leave it out.

== Serving ==
Mezhukkupuratti is served as one of the side dishes of a rice meal, next to curries. Vegetable versions are also served in the sadhya, the vegetarian feast eaten at Onam and other Kerala occasions.
