= Palliyodam =

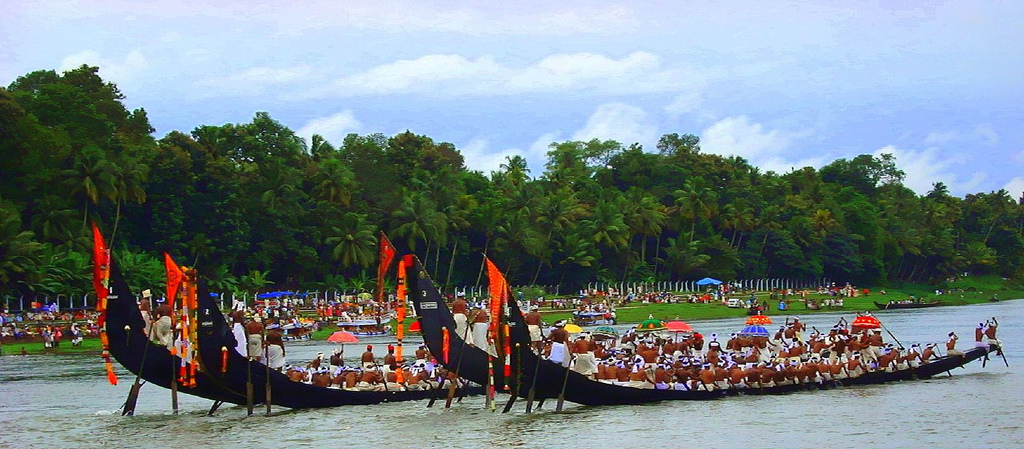
Palliyodam in Aranmula Uthrattathi Boat Race

Palliyodam is a type of large snake boat built and used by Aranmula Parthasarathy Temple in the Pathanamthitta district for the annual water processions of Uthrattathi Jalamela and Valla Sadhya in Pamba River.

== Legend ==
According to the legend, these snake boats were designed by Lord Krishna and were made to look like Sheshanaga, the serpent on which Lord Vishnu rests on.

== Composition ==
Palliyodam is made from anjili (a kind of jackfruit tree). There will be 64 rowers in Palliyodam each representing 64 art forms. And the 4 rowers at the end represent the four Vedas. There are 9 golden shapes at the ends of the Palliyodam which represent the 9 planets(Navagraha). The Palliyodam is kept inside special sheds called Palliyoda Pura, into which outsiders are not allowed to enter.

== Rules ==
Only men are allowed to enter the Palliyodam and they are allowed only after they followed a prescribed diet and ritual, and also they can't enter inside wearing any other clothing, except the Mundu and a thorthu (a white towel).

== See also ==
- Aranmula kottaram
