= Trivandrum boli =

Sweet flatbread from Kerala, India

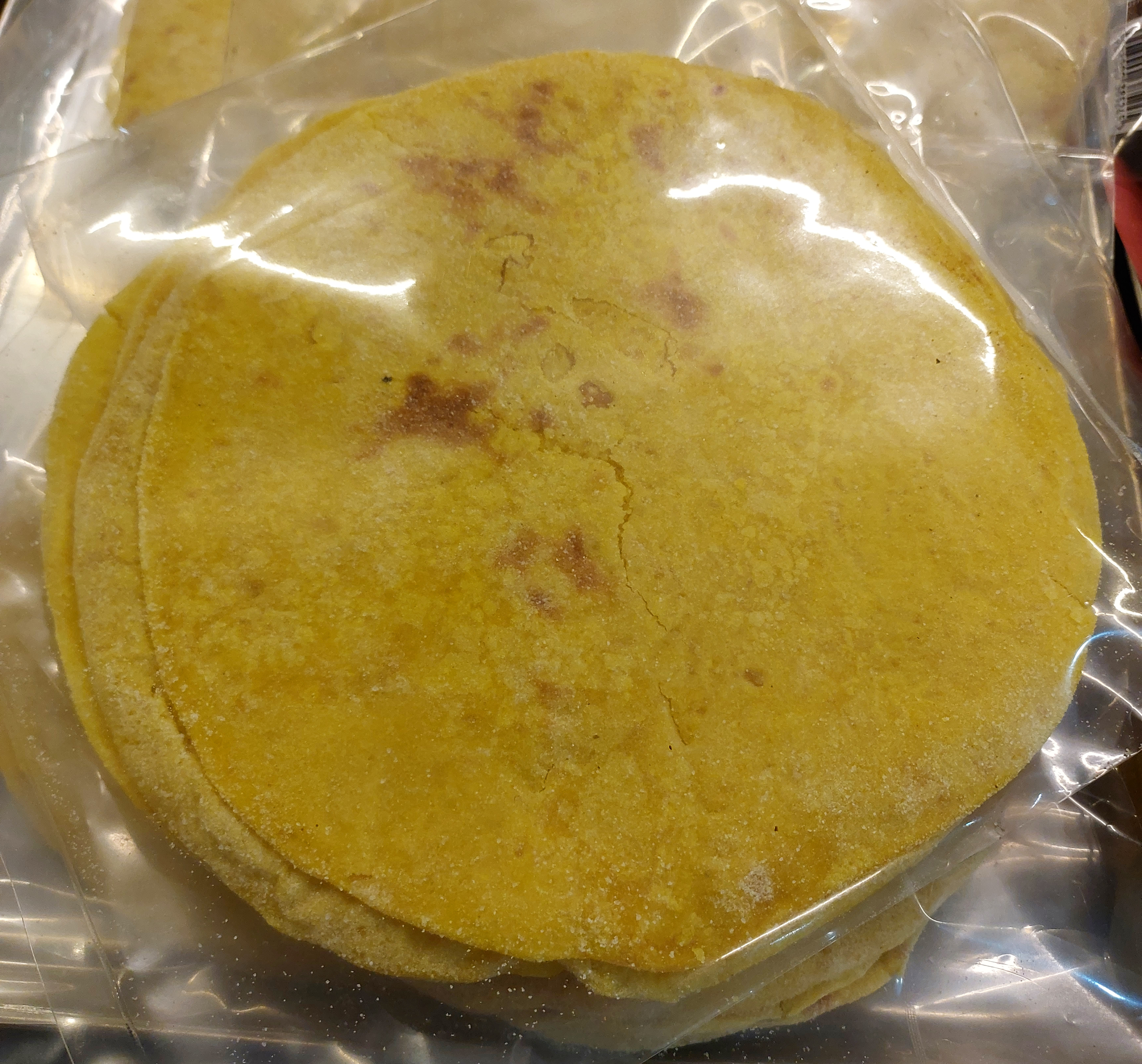
- Sweet boli sold ready-made in packets in Kerala
- Alternative names: Thiruvananthapuram boli
- Type: Sweet flatbread
- Course: Dessert
- Place of origin: India
- Region or state: Trivandrum, Kerala
- Serving temperature: Hot, with payasam poured over
- Main ingredients: Refined flour, chana dal, sugar, cardamom, nutmeg, ghee

Trivandrum boli or Thiruvananthapuram boli (/ˈtɹɪvəndrəm ˈboʊli/ Malayalam pronunciation: [t̪iruʋɐnɐn̪d̪ɾɯm ˈboːɭi]) is a sweet flatbread associated with Trivandrum, the capital of the Indian state of Kerala. It is a thin, stuffed pancake with a filling of sweetened chana dal (split gram), flavoured with cardamom and a little nutmeg, and is closely tied to the Onam sadya and to wedding feasts in the city.

== Origins ==
The dish is thought to have been brought to Thiruvananthapuram by Tulu Brahmin families who settled there from Karnataka. It found favour with the Maratha Brahmin Dewans of the former Travancore state, who made it part of their celebrations, and over time it became a fixture of wedding feasts in the city. Boli resembles the puran poli of Maharashtra; the chief difference is that puran poli is sweetened with jaggery, whereas the Thiruvananthapuram version is made with sugar and finished with a touch of nutmeg.

== Preparation ==
A soft dough of refined wheat flour is worked with a little sesame oil and left to rest. The filling is made by cooking chana dal until soft, draining it, and grinding it to a smooth paste with sugar, cardamom and nutmeg. A portion of the filling is enclosed in a ball of dough, rolled out as thin as possible on a floured surface, and cooked on a hot tawa with ghee until it puffs and colours. The process is slow, and many households buy boli ready-made rather than make it at home.

== Serving ==
Boli is a required item of the sadya in the Thiruvananthapuram and Kollam districts of southern Kerala. It is usually eaten with a ladle of hot payasam poured over it, often milk payasam or paalada payasam, which softens the flatbread and sets its sweetness against the thin milky pudding.

== See also ==
- Puran poli
- Cuisine of Kerala
