= Kichadi =

Cuisine of Kerala

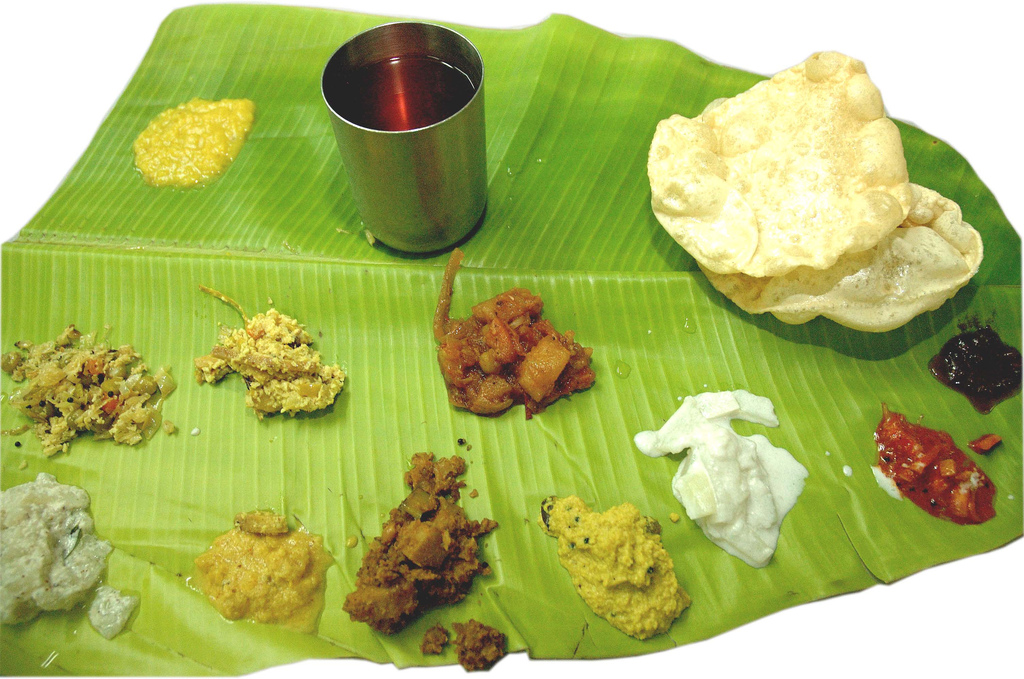
A sadhya meal served for Onam: Kichadi is the yellow serving, second from lower left

Kichadi is a sour variant of pachadi used in the cuisine of Kerala. A sour dish made of curd, ground cumin paste and either cucumber, ash gourd or white gourd, with sautéed mustard seeds and curry leaves as garnish. Kichadi is often served as part of the Sadhya. It is somewhat similar to the raita served in North India, with the difference being the seasoning with mustard and curry leaves.

Kichadi forms a part of the Keralite feast known as Sadhya and is popular during the festivals of Onam and Vishu.
