= Olan (dish) =

Kerala dish in India

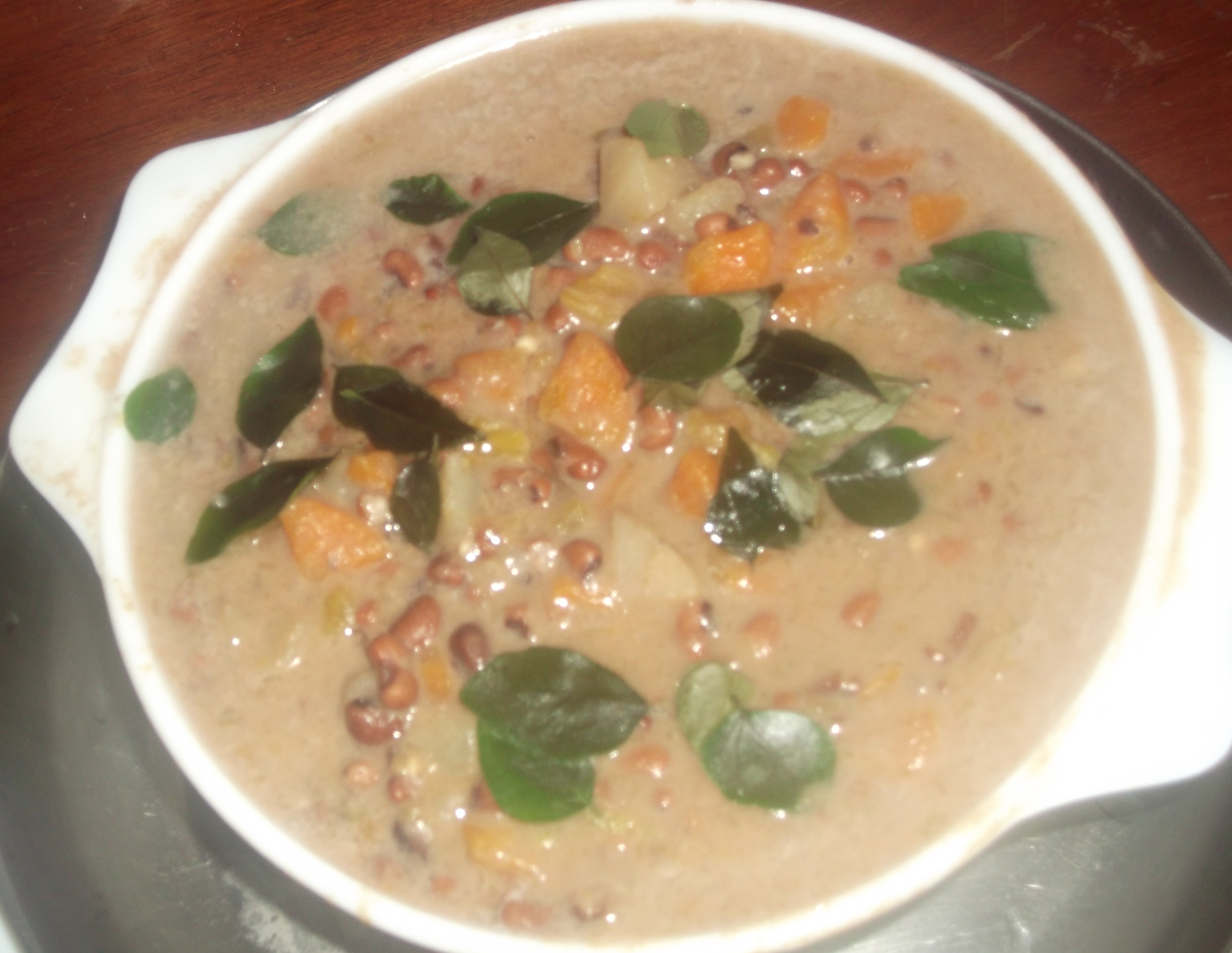
- Alternative names: ഓലൻ
- Place of origin: Southern regions of the Indian subcontinent
- Region or state: Indian subcontinent
- Associated cuisine: India
- Variations: Standard, Nambudiri

Olan (Malayalam: ഓലൻ) is a mild stew in Kerala cuisine, made with ash gourd and cowpeas simmered in coconut milk. It is one of the dishes of the sadhya, the vegetarian feast served at Onam, and is set apart by its light seasoning where coconut oil and curry leaves are stirred in at the end rather than fried into a tempering.

== Preparation ==
The main vegetable is ash gourd (kumbalanga), often with a little pumpkin, sliced thin. Red cowpeas (van payar) are boiled until soft, and the gourd is then simmered with split green chillies and salt until it turns tender. Coconut milk is poured in and the pot is warmed through without a hard boil, after which a little raw coconut oil and fresh curry leaves are stirred in off the heat.

Olan is a mild dish. It leaves out the mustard-seed tempering, chilli powder and turmeric used in many Kerala preparations, so the taste rests on the coconut milk and the cowpeas. Yellow pumpkin can stand in for the ash gourd, and black-eyed peas for the red cowpeas.

== Serving ==
Olan is one of the side dishes of the sadhya, the vegetarian banquet eaten from a banana leaf at Onam and other Kerala occasions.
