= Injipuli =

Curry in Kerala cuisine

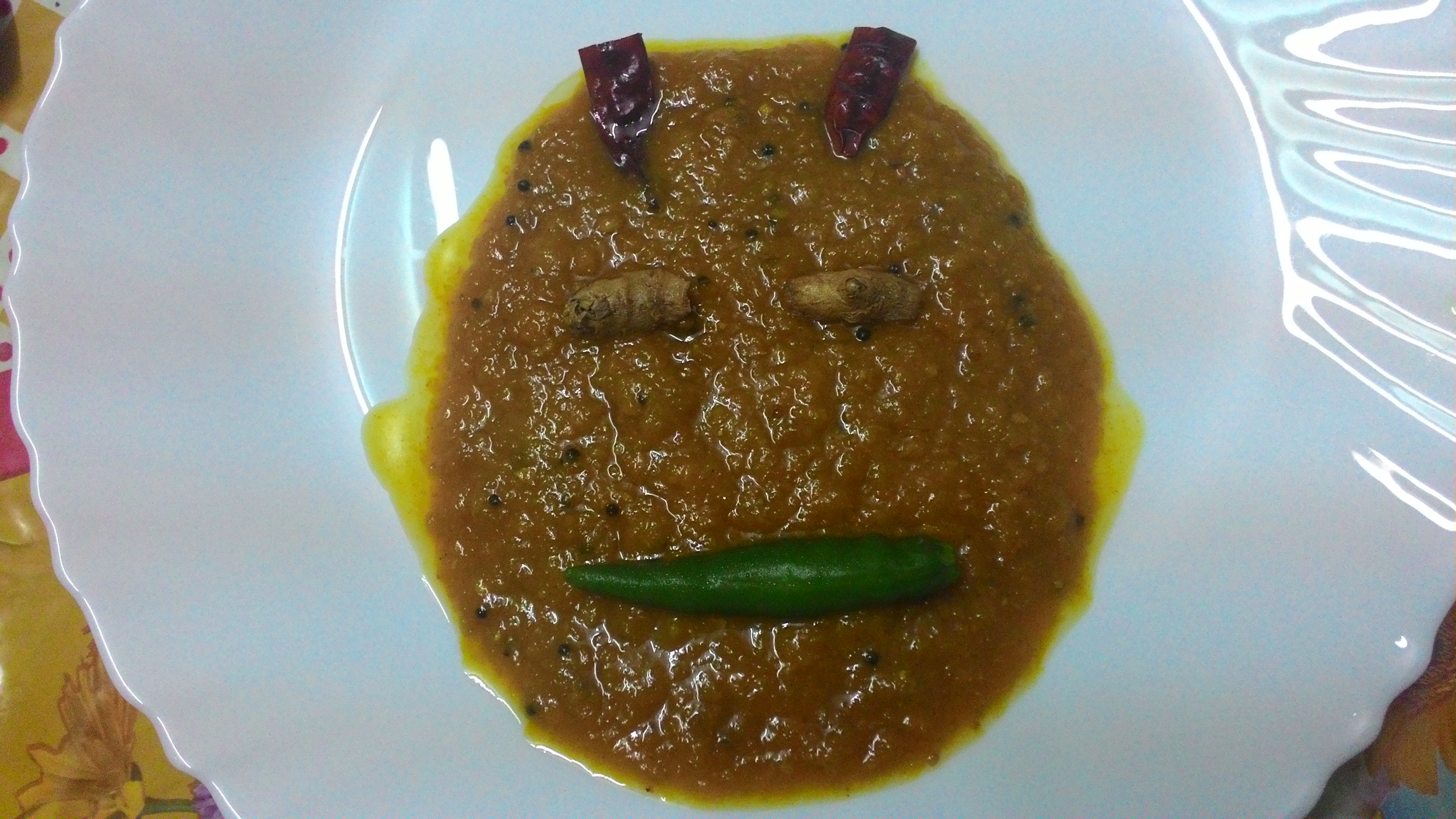
- A dish of puli inji
- Alternative names: Puli inji, inji curry
- Type: Curry
- Place of origin: India
- Region or state: Kerala
- Main ingredients: Ginger, tamarind, green chillies, jaggery

Injipuli (Malayalam: ഇഞ്ചിപുളി), also known as puli inji or inji curry, is a sweet, sour and spicy Kerala condiment made principally from ginger, tamarind, green chillies and jaggery. It is one of the standard items of the Kerala sadya (banquet) and is regarded as an essential component of the feast served at Onam. Though most strongly associated with Kerala, it is also prepared in neighbouring Tamil Nadu, where it is served at weddings and other functions.

== Etymology ==
The name is a compound of the Dravidian words inji ("ginger") and puli ("tamarind"), the dish's two defining ingredients; the two orderings of the name, injipuli and puli inji, are used interchangeably in different parts of Kerala.

== Preparation ==
The ginger is peeled, finely chopped or sliced, and fried in coconut oil until browned, which mellows its pungency. It is then simmered with tamarind extract, jaggery and green chillies, and seasoned with tempering of mustard seeds, fenugreek, dried red chillies and curry leaves, together with turmeric and salt. The mixture is cooked down until it reaches a thick, jam-like consistency in which the four tastes of sweet, sour, salt and heat are balanced. Because of its high tamarind, jaggery and oil content, injipuli keeps well and is often made a day or more in advance and stored like a pickle. Owing to this concentrated, long-keeping character, it is described in different sources as a curry, a pickle or a chutney.

== Serving and cultural significance ==
On the sadya banana leaf, injipuli is served in a very small quantity at a fixed position, conventionally in the top corner, and is eaten in small amounts between mouthfuls to cut and balance the richer dishes of the meal. It is also valued as a digestive accompaniment to the large, predominantly vegetarian feast. Beyond Onam, it appears at the sadya served for Vishu and at weddings and other celebratory occasions, and is commonly eaten with plain rice, curd rice and other South Indian dishes.

== In folklore ==
A folk tale repeated in Kerala ties the dish to the scholar Vararuchi. Testing a young woman's resourcefulness, he asks her to serve a meal of a hundred dishes by the time he returns from bathing; she gives him rice with inji curry alone, and the single relish is taken to stand for the hundred. From this the dish came to be spoken of as the equal of a hundred, or in some tellings a hundred and one, curries. Inji curry is also credited in Kerala with medicinal value and is eaten as a folk remedy for indigestion.

== See also ==
- Sadya
- Onam
- List of Indian condiments
- South Indian cuisine
