= Sadya =

Traditional meal of Kerala, India

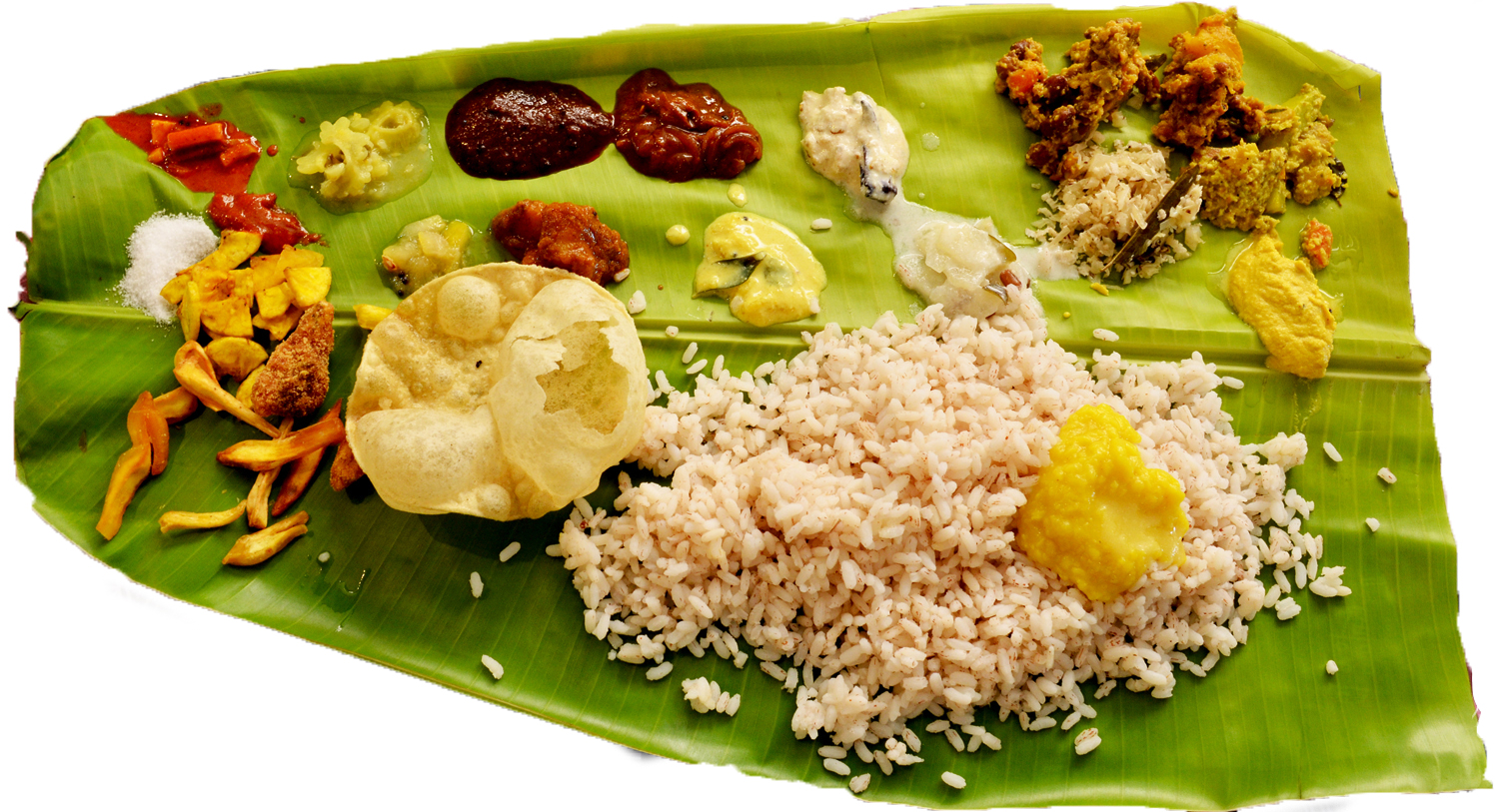
- Place of origin: India
- Region or state: Kerala
- Other information: Kamayan

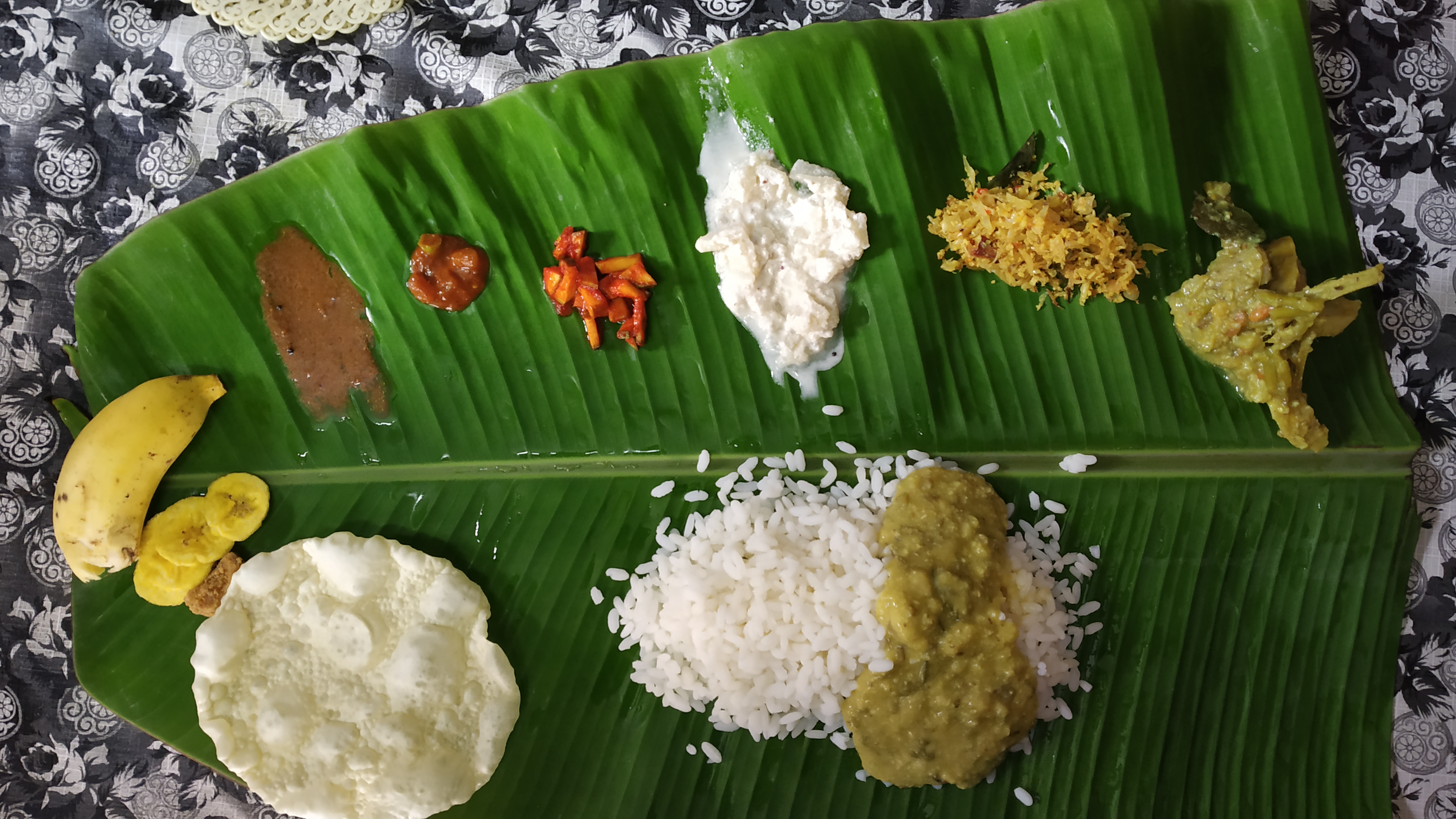
Traditional Kerala sadya

Sadya (Malayalam: സദ്യ, IPA: [sɐd̪jɐ]), also spelt sadhya, is a meal originating from the southern state of Kerala in India. It is of cultural importance to the Malayalis, consisting of a variety of traditional vegetarian dishes and side-dishes usually served on a banana leaf as lunch. Sadya is typically served as a traditional feast for the festivals of Onam and Vishu, as well as other special occasions such as birthdays and weddings.

== Etymology ==
The Malayalam word sadya (സദ്യ) derives from Sanskrit ságdhi- (सग्धि), referring to a communal feast.

== Overview ==
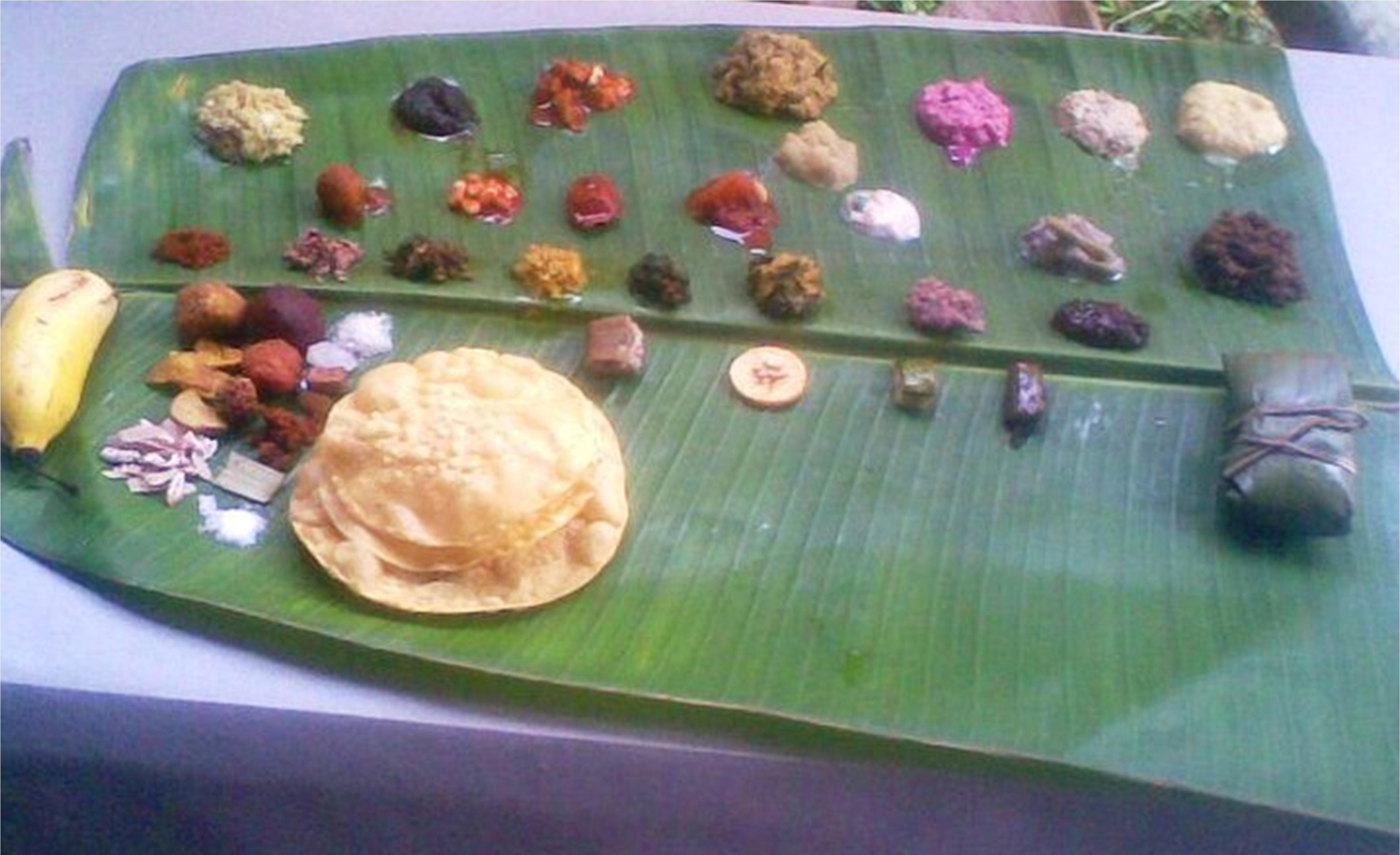
Valla sadya

A typical sadya can have about 24–28 dishes served as a single course. In some cases, where it is much larger, it can include over 64 items, such as the sadya for Aranmula Vallamkali (Valla-sadya). During a traditional sadya meal, people are seated cross-legged on mats. Food is eaten with the right hand, without cutlery. The fingers are cupped to form a ladle.

The main dish is plain boiled rice, served along with other curries/koottaan (കൂട്ടാന്‍) which include parippu, sambar, rasam, pulisseri and others like kaalan, avial, thoran, olan, pachadi, kichadi, koottukari, erissery, mango pickle, injipuli, mezhukkupuratti, naranga achaar (lime pickle), as well as papadam, plantain chips, sharkara upperi, banana, plain curd and buttermilk. The buttermilk is typically served near the end of the meal. The traditional dessert called payasam served at the end of the meal is of many kinds and usually three or more are served. Some of the varieties are Paalada pradhaman, Ada pradhaman, Parippu pradhaman, Chakka pradhaman, Gothampu payasam, Paal payasam, etc. The multiple curries are all made with different vegetables and have their own flavor. The variety of curries is to symbolize prosperity and well-being.

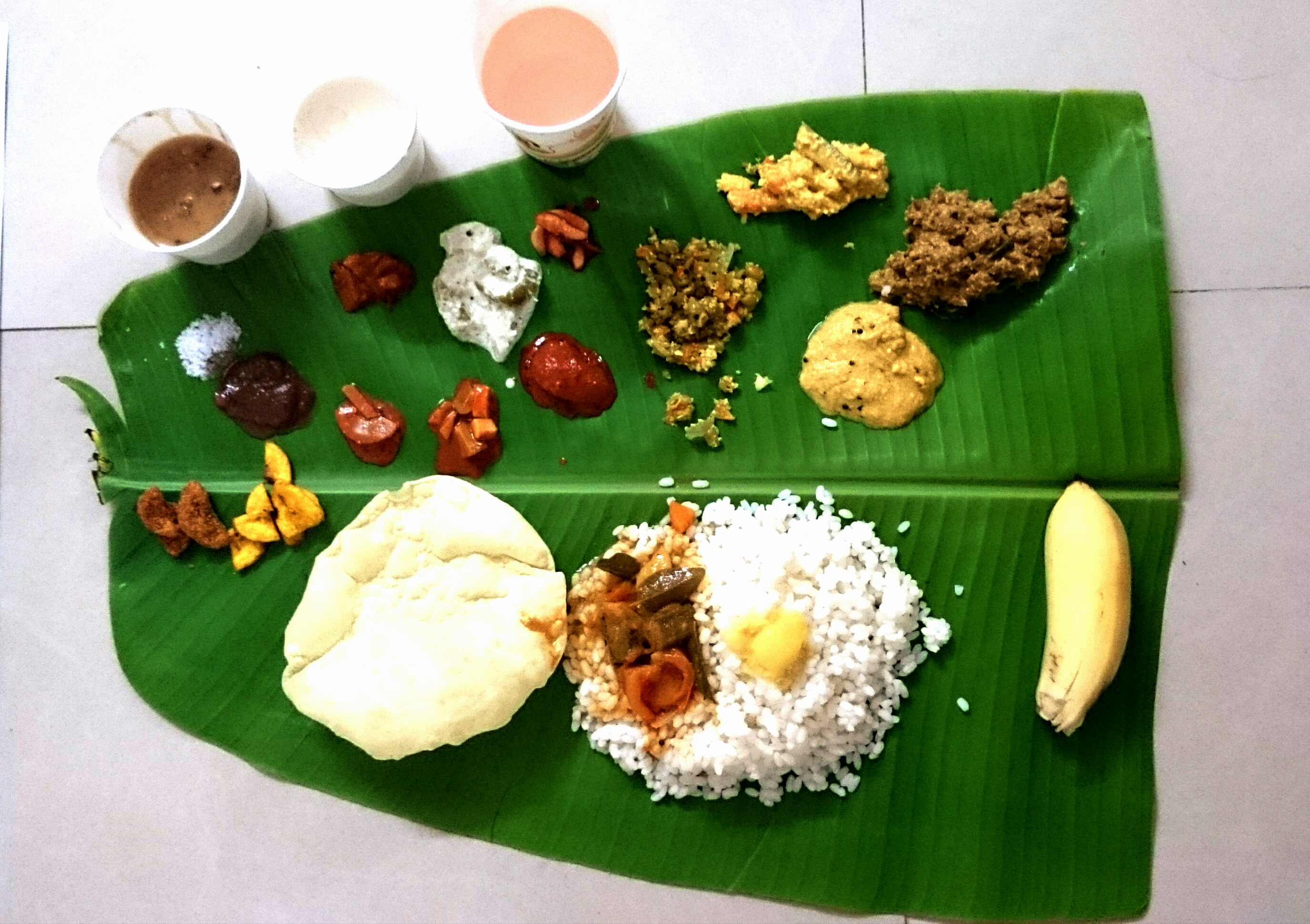
A sadya served for Onam

The dishes are served in different spots on the banana leaf. For example, the pickles are served on the top left corner and the banana in the bottom left corner, which helps the waiters to easily identify and decide on offering additional servings. The most common ingredients in all the dishes are coconut as it is abundant in Kerala. Coconut milk is used in some dishes, and coconut oil is used for frying.

There are regional variations in the sadya menu, influenced by local customs and ingredient availability. Although the custom is to use traditional and seasonal vegetables indigenous to Kerala or the Southwest Coast of India, it has become common practice to include vegetables such as carrots, pineapples, and beans in the dishes. Traditionally, dishes in a sadya do not contain onion or garlic. The meal may be followed by chewing of vettila murukkaan, betel leaf with lime and arecanut. This helps with the digestion of the meal and cleanses the palate.

== Variations ==
- Trivandrum Sadhya
- Valla Sadhya

== Preparations ==
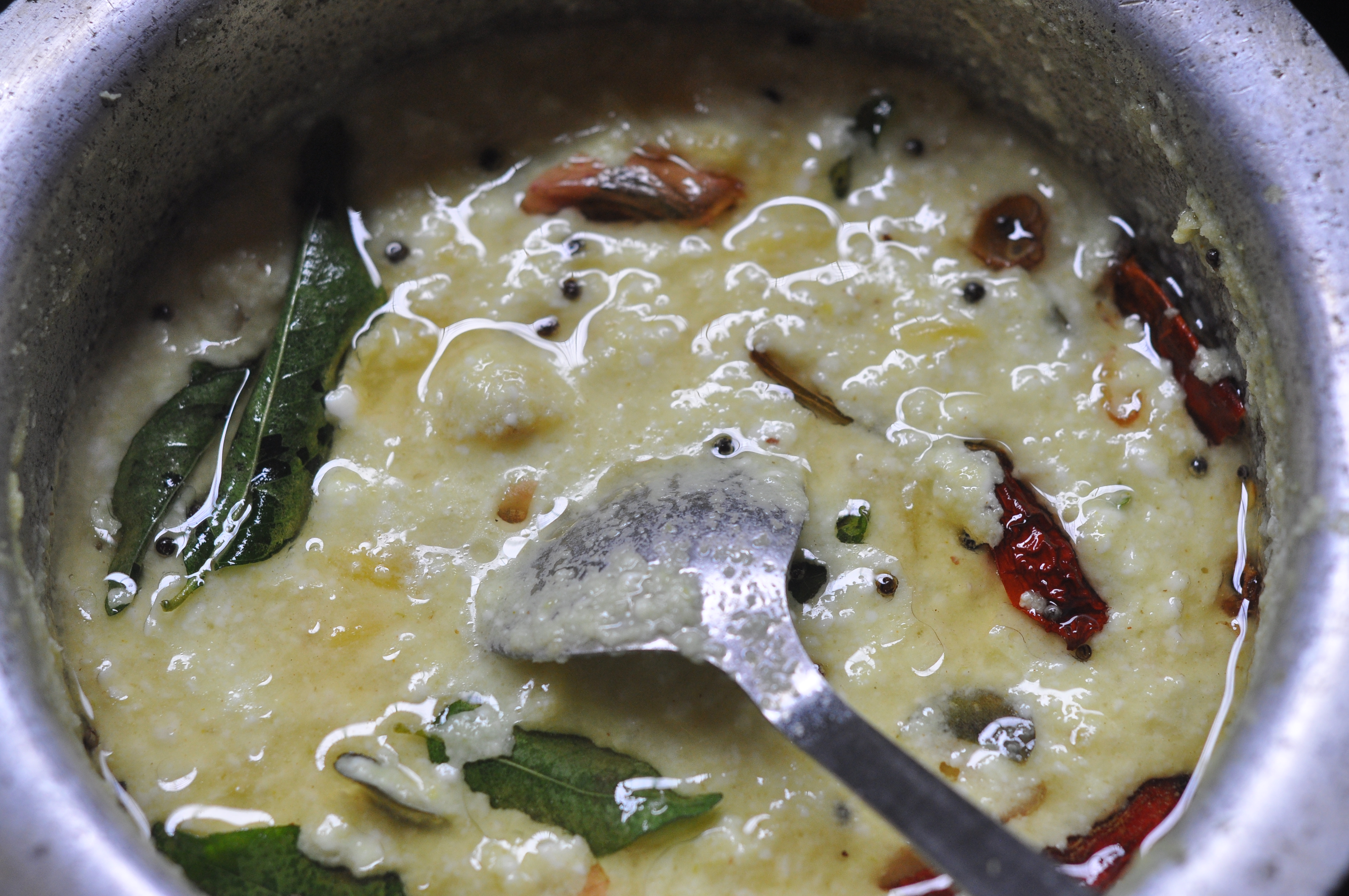
Pachadi is sometimes used in sadya.

The sadya is usually served for lunch, although a lighter version is served for dinner as well. Preparations begin the night before, and the dishes are prepared before ten o'clock in the morning on the day of the celebration. Nowadays, sadya is often served on tables, as people no longer find it convenient to sit on the floor. Sourcing of items/ingredients for a sadya is an elaborate and careful process to ensure quality. The lighting of the fire to prepare the sadya is done after a prayer to Agni, and the first serving is offered on a banana leaf in front of a lighted nilavilakku as an offering to Ganapati.

In a sadya, the meals are served on a banana leaf. The leaf is folded and closed once the meal is finished. In some instances, closing the leaf toward you communicates satisfaction with the meal, while folding it away from oneself signifies that the meal can be improved. However, the direction the leaf is folded in can have different meanings in various parts of Kerala.

The Central Travancore-style sadya is known to be the most disciplined and tradition-bound. There is usually an order followed in serving the dishes, starting from the chips and pickles first. However, different styles and approaches to making and serving the dishes are adopted in various parts of Kerala depending on local preferences. Aranmula Valla-sadya is the most celebrated sadya with over 64 items served traditionally.

== Typical ingredients ==
The items include:

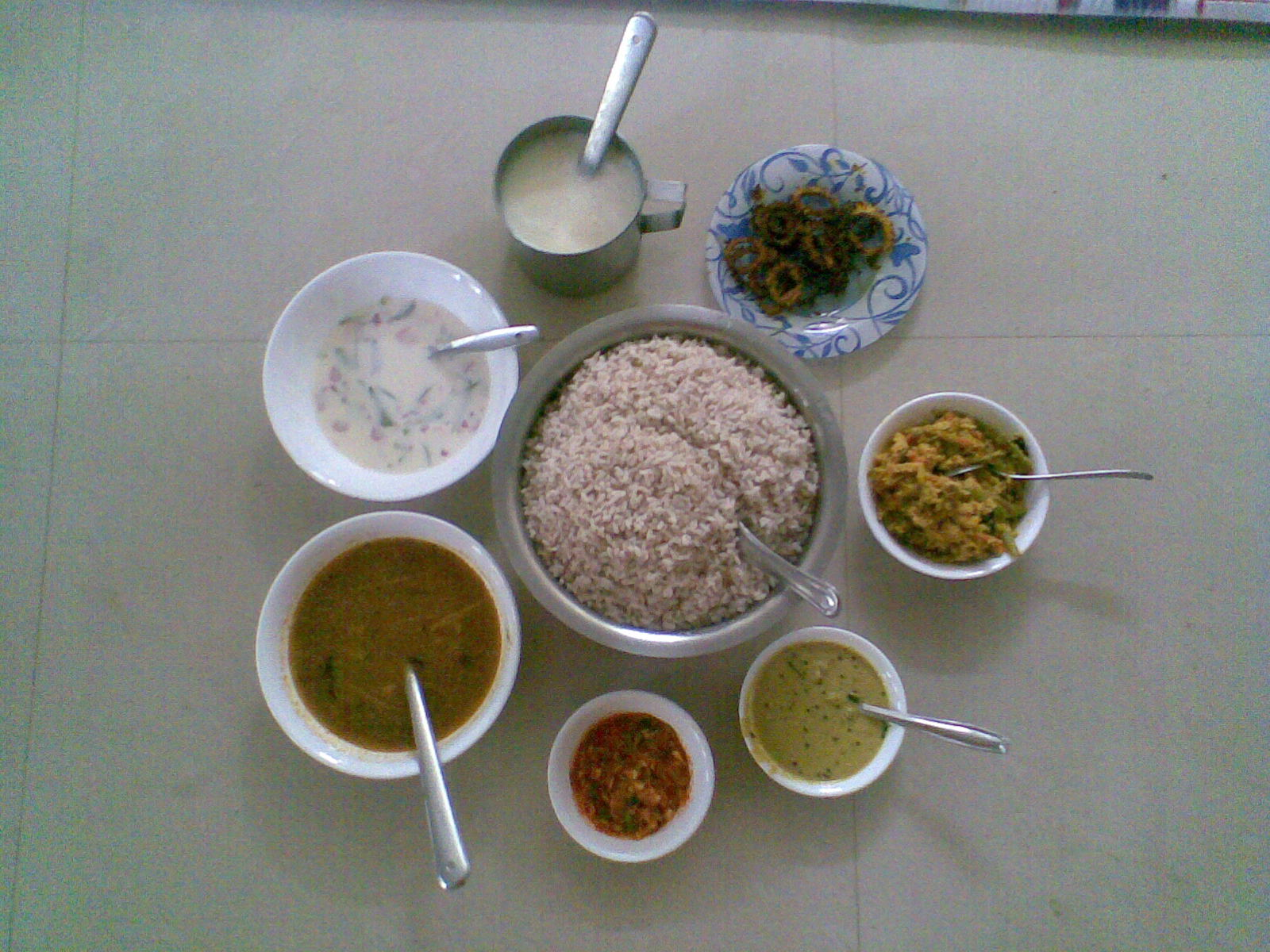
Sadya items. Clockwise from top: paayasam (in mug), bittergourd thoran, aviyal, kaalan, lime pickle, saambaar, buttermilk, boiled rice in centre

- Rice: It is the main item in a sadya. It is usually Kerala red rice (semi-polished parboiled brown) which is used for the sadya, but Kerala matta rice is sometimes used.
- Parippu: A thick curry lentil dish.
- Sambar: A thick gravy made of lentils, tamarind, vegetables like drumsticks, tomato, yam etc., and flavoured with asafoetida.
- Rasam: A watery dish made of tamarind, tomatoes, and spices like black pepper, asafoetida, coriander, chili pepper, etc. It is very spicy in taste and aids in digestion. However, in some regions Rasam is not counted as part of a sadya.
- Avial: A dense mixture of various vegetables and coconut, it is seasoned with curry leaves and coconut oil.
- Kaalan: Made of curd, coconut, and any one vegetable like "nendran" plantain or a tuber-like yam. It is very thick and more sour, and typically can last for a longer period owing to the lower water content.
- Olan: A light dish, prepared of white gourd and cowpeas, coconut milk, and ginger seasoned with coconut oil.
- Koottukari: Vegetables like banana or yam cooked with black chickpeas, coconut and black pepper.
- Erissery: A thick curry made from pumpkin, cowpeas and coconut.
- Pachadi: Sour curry made of curd and usually cucumber or sliced ash gourd cooked in coconut ground with mustard seeds and seasoned with sautéed mustard seeds and curry leaves.
- Sweet Pachadi: A sweet form of Pachadi, made with pineapple, pumpkin or grapes in curd. The gravy masala comprises coconut ground with cumin seeds and green chillies.
- Pulisseri: A sour, yellow-coloured thin curry made with slightly soured yogurt and cucumber. A sweet variant called Mampazha-pulissheri replaces cucumber with a combination of ripe mangoes and jaggery.
- Injipuli: A sweet pickle made of ginger, tamarind, green chilies, and jaggery, also called Puli-inji.
- Thoran: A dish of sautéed vegetables such as peas, green beans, raw jackfruit, carrots, or cabbage (usually) with grated coconut.
- Mezhukkupuratti: A style of preparation for a vegetarian dish where the vegetable is stir-fried with spices. Chopped onions or shallots may also be used.
- Achaar: Spicy pickles of raw mango (Mango pickle), lemon, lime, (Narangakari) etc.
- Pappadam: Made with lentil flour, it is paired with rice and can be eaten as an appetizer.
- Sharkara upperi: Banana chips with jaggery.
- Kaaya Varuthathu: Banana chips.
- Banana: A ripe banana is often served with the sadya to be eaten with the dessert, Payasam.
- Chammanthi podi: coconut powder served as a dry condiment or chutney.
- Sambharam, also referred to as moru: A drink made from salted buttermilk with green chilli, ginger, and curry leaves, it is drunk to improve digestion and is typically served near the end of the meal.
- Kadumanga: Sliced mango pickle. Usually served as the third condiment of the sadya.

These side dishes are followed by desserts like Pradhaman and Payasams.

== Pradhaman ==
Pradhaman is a sweet dish in the form of a thick liquid; similar to payasam, but with more variety in terms of ingredients and more elaborately made. It is made with white sugar or jaggery to which coconut milk is added. The main difference between a pradhaman and a payasam is that the former uses coconut milk, while the liquid versions of payasam use cow's milk.

- Palada pradhaman is made of flakes of cooked rice ada, milk, and sugar.
- Pazha pradhaman is made of cooked "nendra" plantain or banana in jaggery and coconut milk.
- Gothambu pradhaman is made of broken wheat.
- Parippu pradhaman is made of green gram.
- Chakka prathaman is made of jackfruit.
- Ada pradhaman is made of rice-ada (Rice flakes).
- Kadala pradhaman is made from bengal gram.

== See also ==
- Cuisine of Kerala
- Kamayan (a similar meal from the Philippines)
- Onam sadya
- Trivandrum Sadhya
- Trivandrum Boli
- South Indian cuisine
- Thali
