= Thoran =

Indian vegetable dish

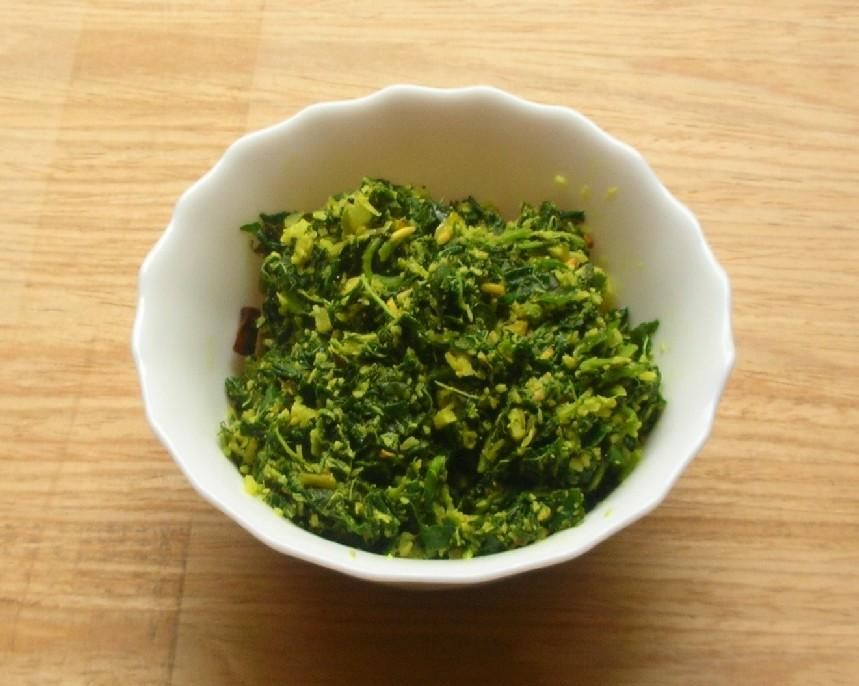
- Southern Kerala-style traditional thoran made with cheera leaves, grated coconut, chilies and other ingredients
- Alternative names: upperi
- Place of origin: India
- Region or state: Kerala
- Associated cuisine: Kerala cuisine
- Main ingredients: Vegetables, Coconut

Thoran (pronounced [t̪oːɾan]); or upperi in Northern Kerala is a class of dry vegetable dishes combined with coconut that originated in the Indian state of Kerala. This common dish is usually eaten with rice and curry and is also part of the traditional Keralite sadhya. In Tamil Nadu, a similar dish is known as Poriyal. Thoran is prepared using various vegetables such as cabbage, tender jackfruit (unripe jackfruit), carrot, beetroot, beans, spinach, green beans, ivy gourd, elephant foot yam, and raw banana, among others. It is generally named according to the vegetable used, such as cabbage thoran and tender jackfruit thoran.

== Preparation ==
Thoran is a dry dish traditionally made of finely chopped vegetables such as cabbage, yardlong bean and other bean varieties, unripe jackfruit, bittergourd (Malayalam: കയ്പ്പക്ക/പാവയ്‌ക്ക) or elephant foot yam, of leaves such as green or red spinach (Malayalam: ചീര), Moringa oleifera or Ipomoea aquatica, as well as of flowers such as Moringa oleifera or Sesbania grandiflora.

The chopped vegetable is mixed with grated coconut, mustard seeds, curry leaves and turmeric powder and briefly sauteed on a pan over high heat.

== Variants ==
Thoran can be also made with carrots, green beans, cabbage, green tomatoes or spinach, vegetables that were traditionally not available in Kerala. The traditional recipes made in southern Kerala do not use garlic, but in the present day, garlic and onion are also added.

== Gallery ==
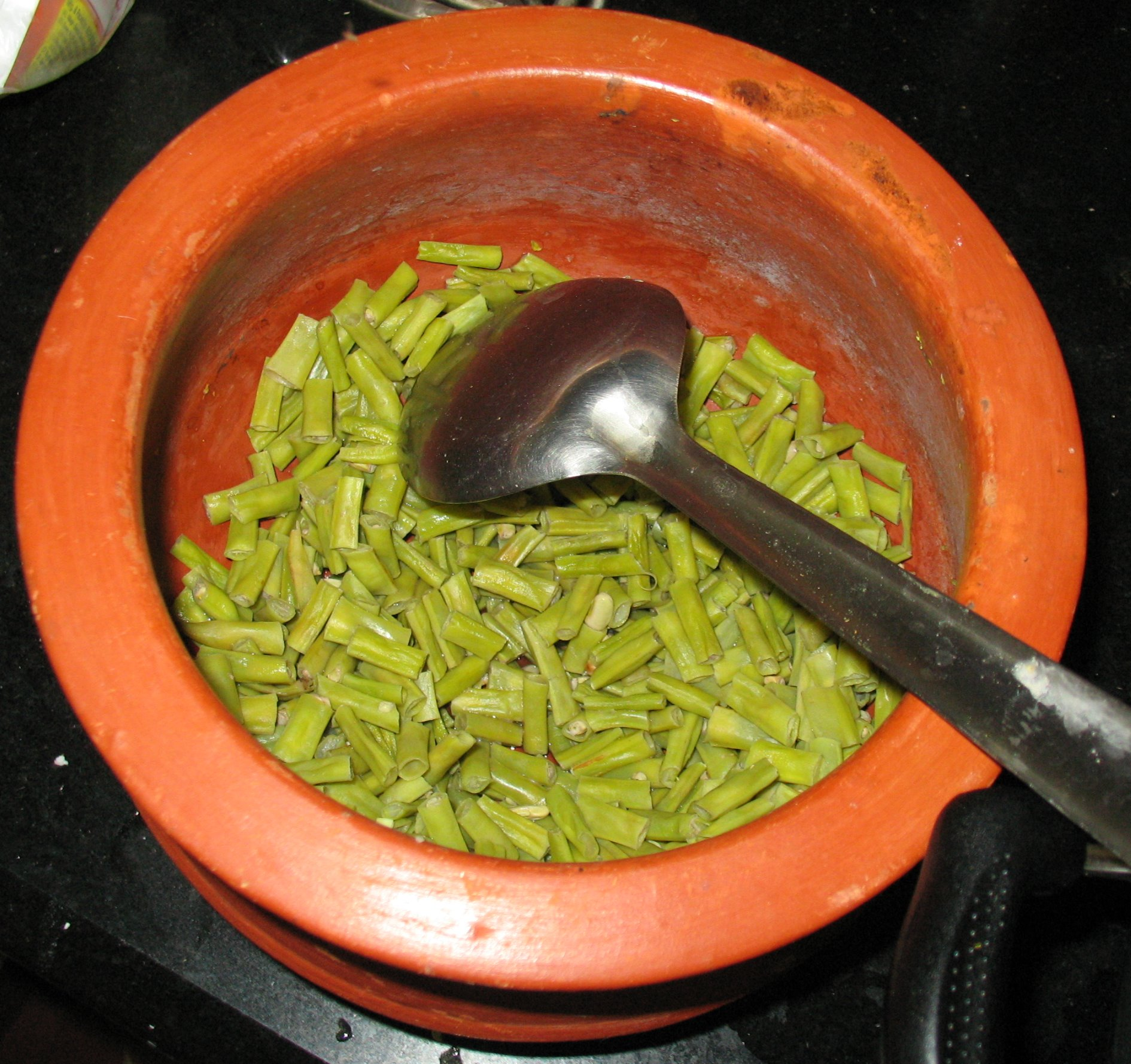
A picture of Payar Thoran being cooked in a clay pot

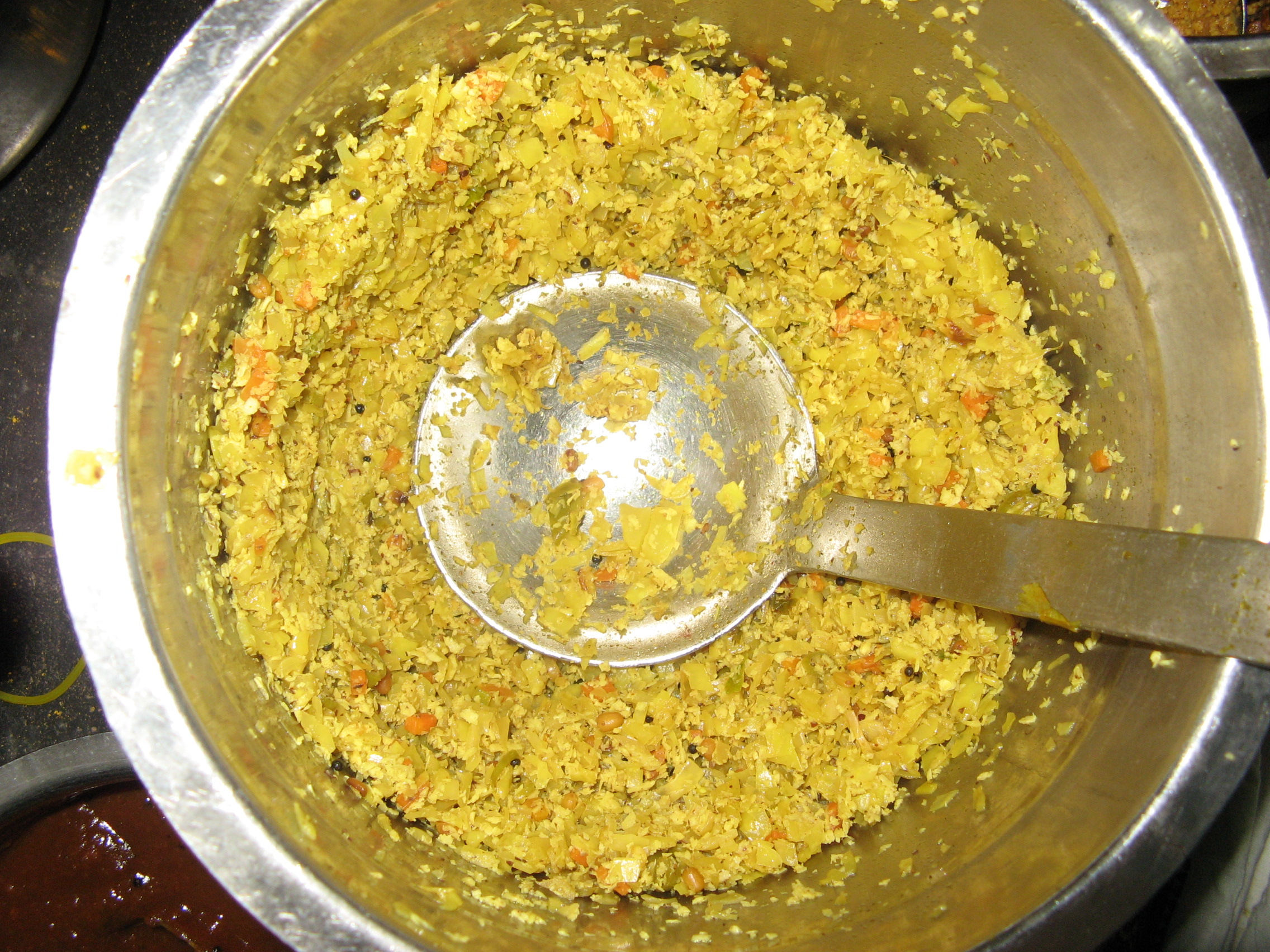
Cabbage thoran

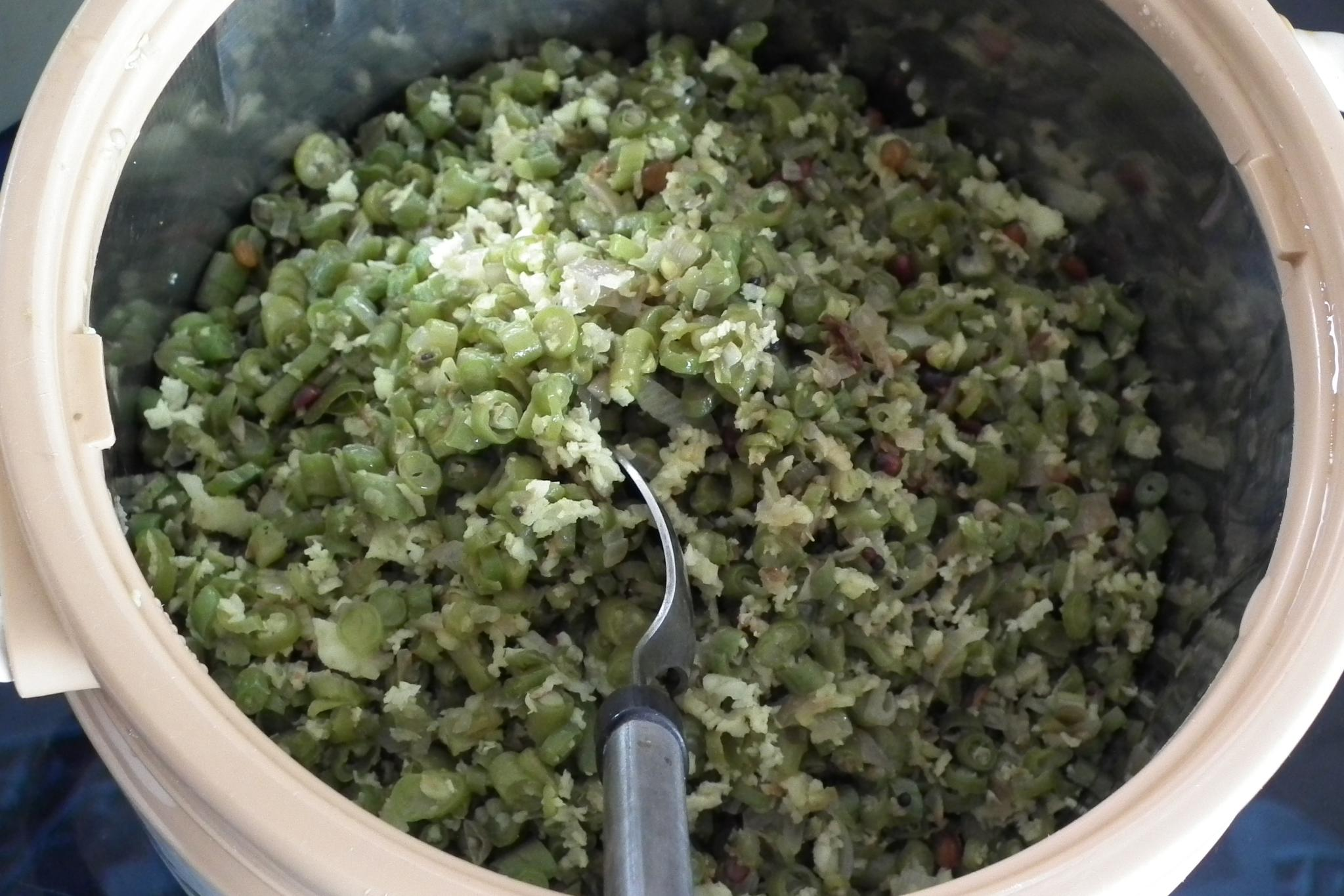
Beans Thoran

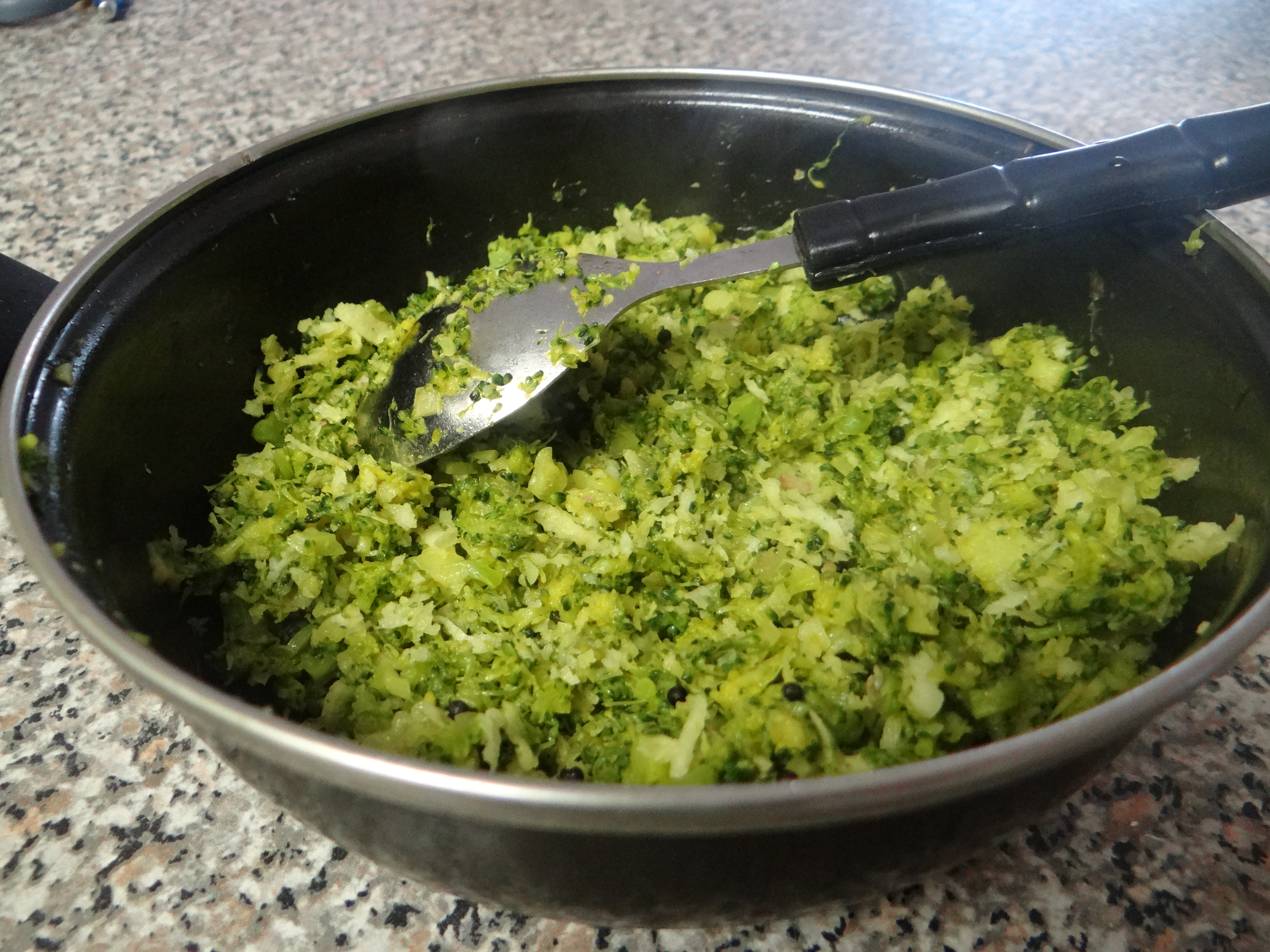
Broccoli Thoran

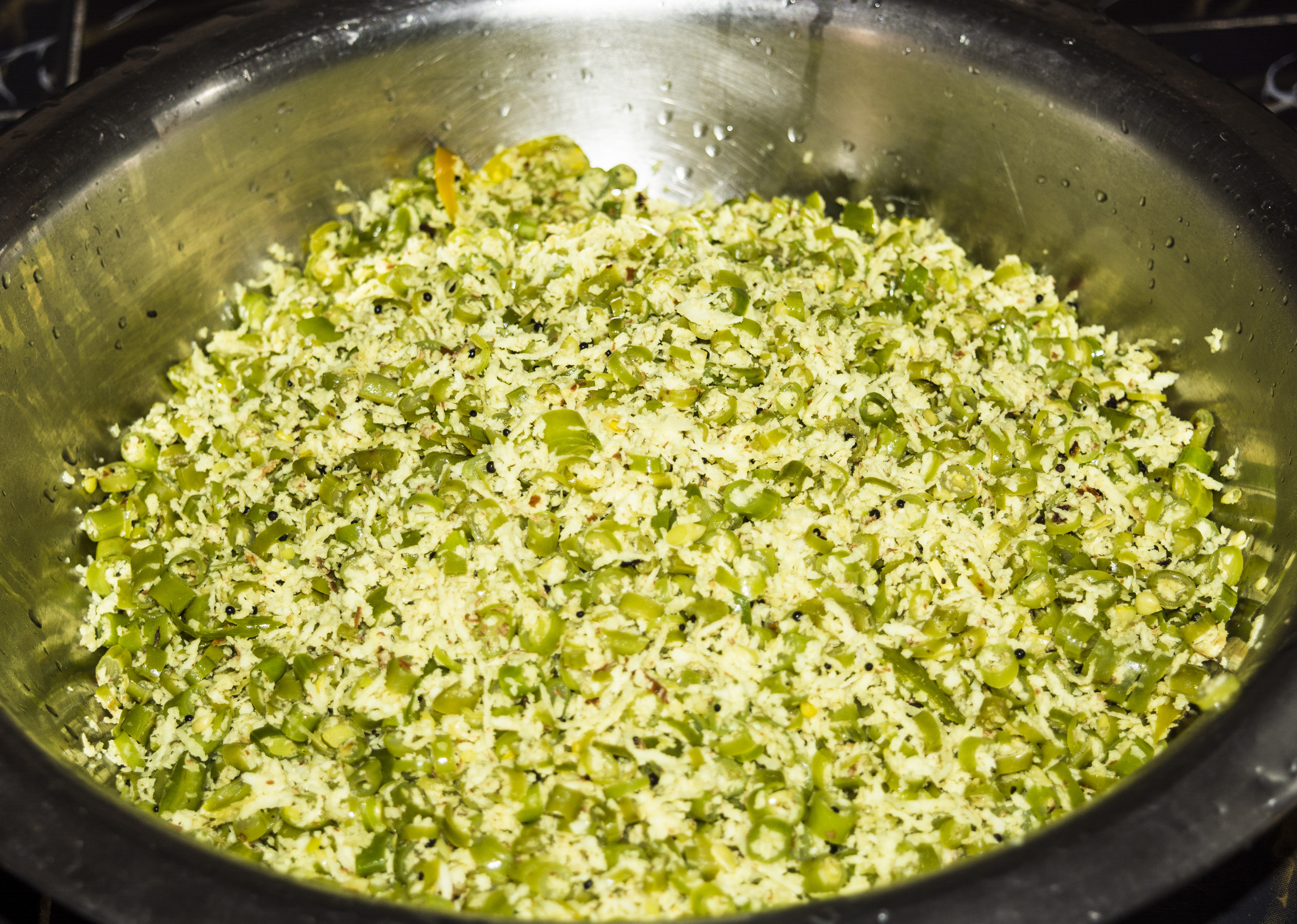
Green Bean Thoran

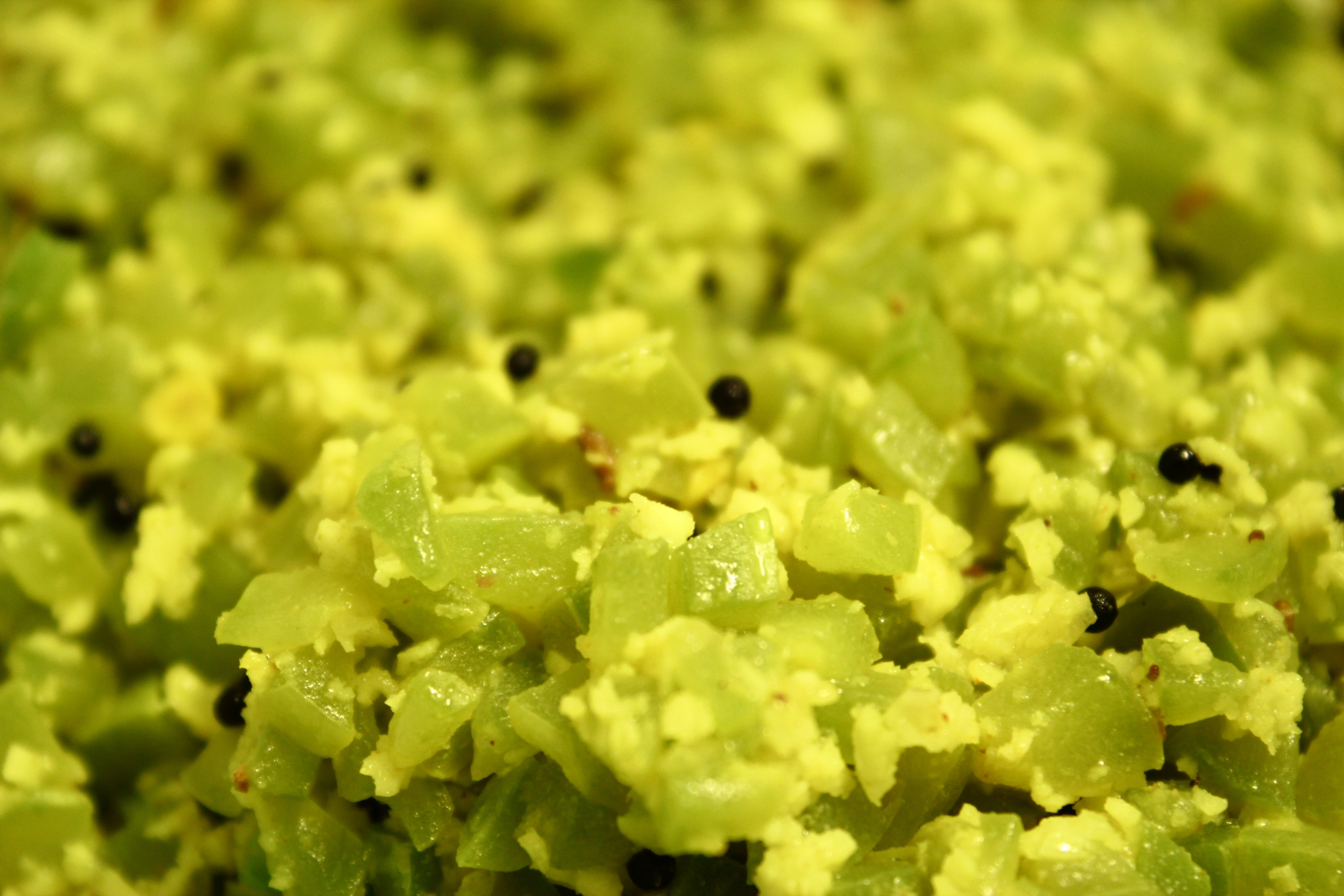
Snakegourd thoran

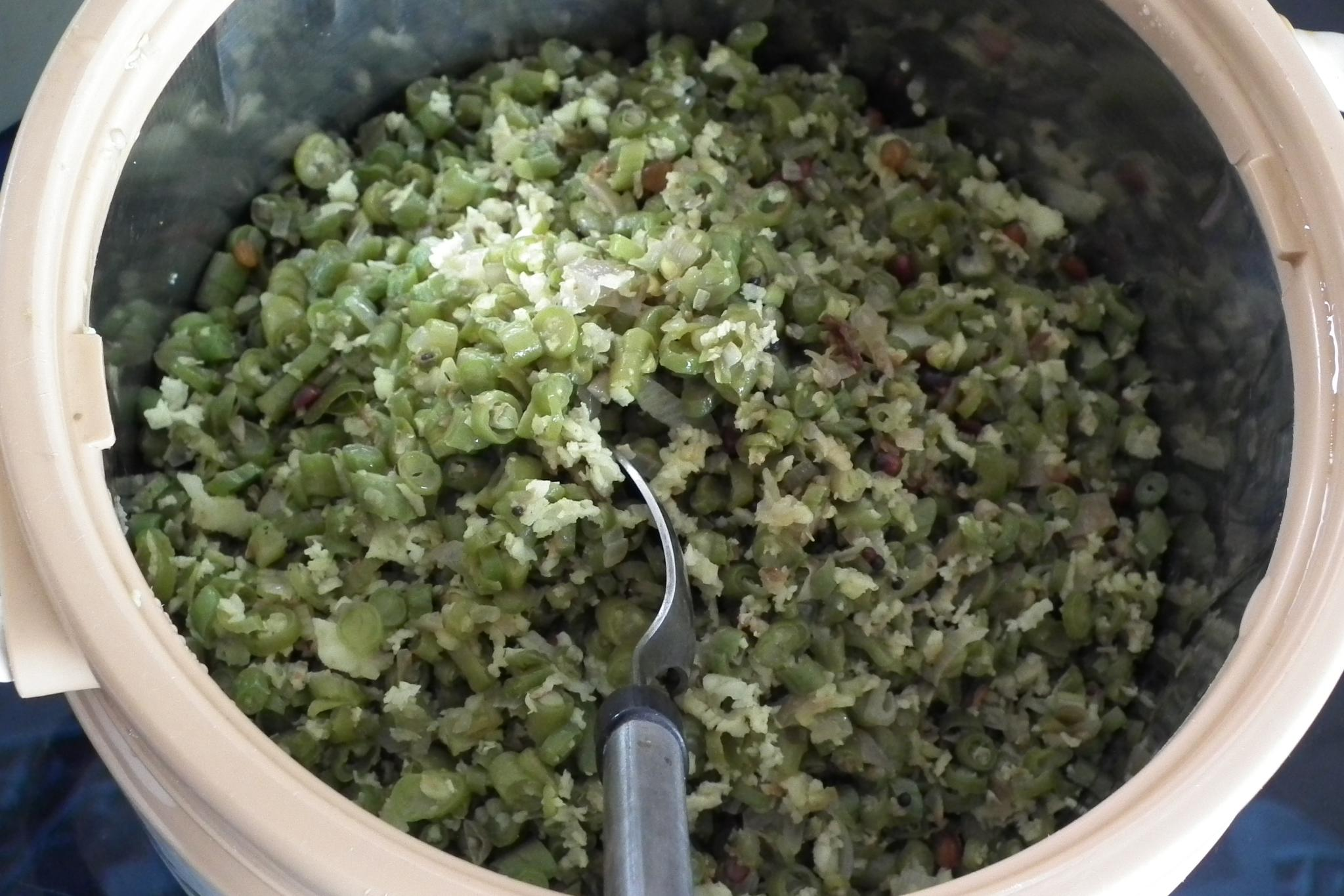
Kerala yardlong bean thoran

== See also ==
- Cuisine of Kerala
- Poduthol
- Sadhya
