= Kaalan =

Kerala dish

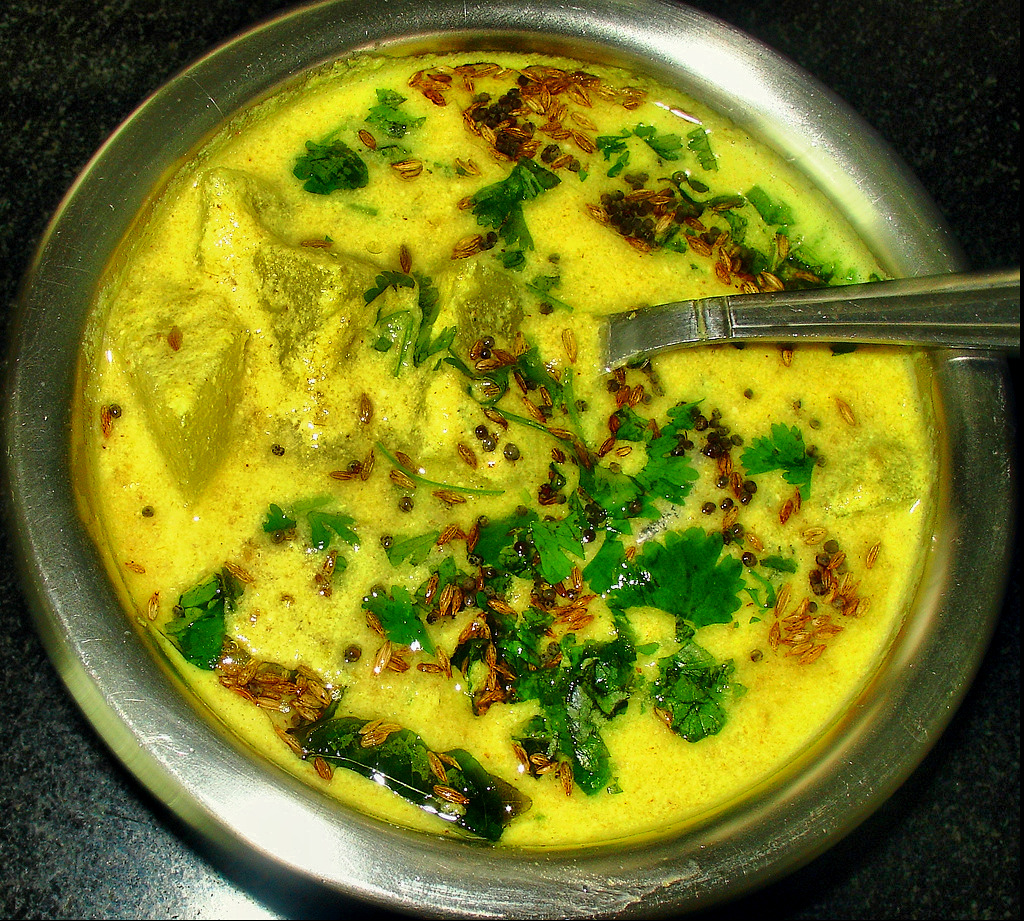
- A kaalan preparation
- Alternative names: Kurukku kalan
- Type: Curry
- Place of origin: India
- Region or state: Kerala
- Main ingredients: Yam or raw plantain, yoghurt, coconut, pepper

Kaalan (Malayalam: കാളൻ [kaːɭan]) is a Keralite dish from South India, made from yoghurt, coconut and either raw plantain (nendra kaaya) or a tuber such as elephant-foot yam (chena). It is thick and sour, and is one of the dishes of the Kerala sadya, the traditional vegetarian feast.

== Preparation ==
The plantain or yam is diced and boiled with turmeric, pepper, green chillies and salt until soft. A paste of grated coconut, cumin and green chillies is stirred in, followed by sour curd, and the mixture is cooked down until it thickens. The curd is added over low heat, and the dish is simmered rather than boiled, since boiling makes it curdle; it is stirred in one direction as it reduces. A tempering of mustard seeds, fenugreek, dried red chillies and curry leaves fried in oil or ghee is stirred in at the end. Pepper is the dominant flavour, set against the sourness of the curd.

== Characteristics and variations ==
Kaalan is much thicker than the related Kerala yoghurt curry pulissery and more sour than avial. Because so much of its liquid is cooked off, it keeps longer than a thinner curry and is often made in advance. The well-reduced version prepared for the sadya is commonly called kurukku kalan, after its concentrated consistency, and is cooked in larger quantities. Recipes vary across Kerala, and some cooks raise the level of pepper or chillies against the signature sour base.

== Serving ==
Kaalan is served as part of the sadya. It is a standard dish at the feasts held for Onam and Vishu.

== See also ==
- Cuisine of Kerala
