= Koottukari =

Yellow curry

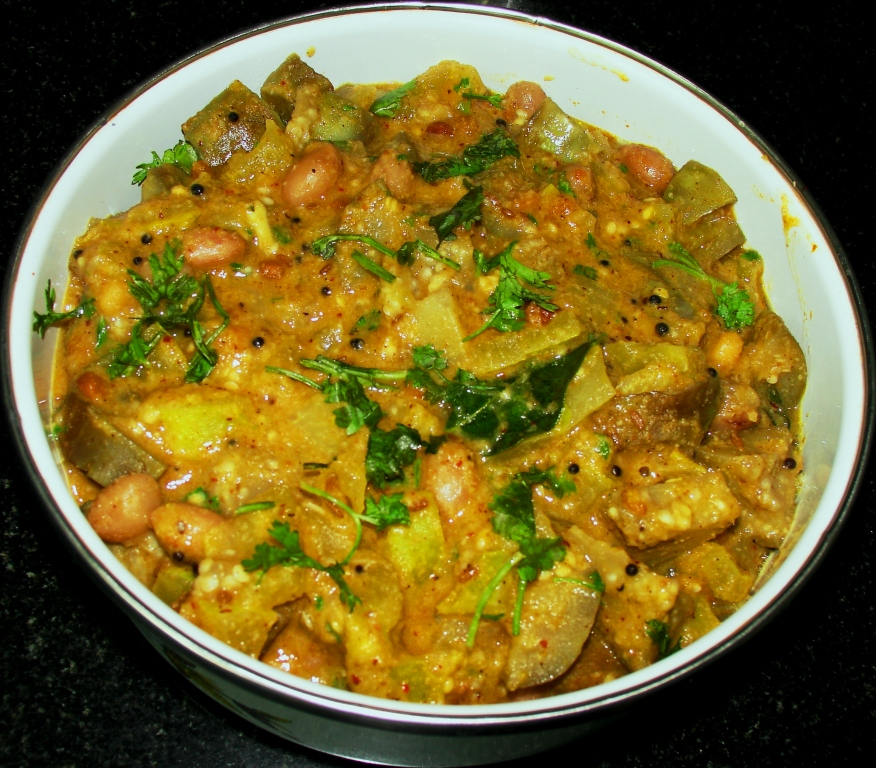
- Type: Curry
- Place of origin: India
- Region or state: Kerala

Koottukari, also spelled kootu curry or koottu kari, is a dish from the cuisine of Kerala, in southern India. It is a thick curry of vegetables and pulses in a base of roasted coconut, and is one of the standard dishes of the sadhya, the vegetarian feast served during Onam and other Kerala celebrations. Like other South Indian koottu preparations, it is made by cooking vegetables together with pulses.

== Preparation ==
Koottukari is built on a mixture of one or more vegetables and a pulse. The vegetables commonly include yam (chena), raw plantain, ash gourd, pumpkin, carrot and snake gourd, while the pulse is usually black chickpeas (kadala) or Bengal gram. The vegetables and the soaked chickpeas are boiled with turmeric until soft.

The taste of the dish comes mainly from coconut. Grated coconut is roasted with cumin and dried red chillies until it turns brown, then ground to a paste and stirred into the cooked vegetables. The curry is finished with a tempering of coconut oil, mustard seeds and curry leaves, and some cooks add a little jaggery for a mild sweetness. This results in thick and mildly spiced, with a nutty flavour from the browned coconut.

Regional versions differ mostly in how dark the coconut is roasted and how much pepper goes in. A lighter, sattvic style linked to temple and Brahmin cooking leaves out onion and garlic, whereas the version made around Kannur in the Malabar area uses coconut roasted to a deep brown and a good amount of black pepper.

== Sadhya ==
Koottukari is one of the curries of the sadhya, the vegetarian meal that Malayalis serve on a banana leaf. A full sadhya can run to more than twenty dishes arranged on the leaf in a set order, and koottukari sits among the standard ones. The feast is served at weddings and temple functions and, most prominently, at Onam.

== See also ==
- Cuisine of Kerala
