= Avial =

Indian dish containing a thick mixture of vegetables

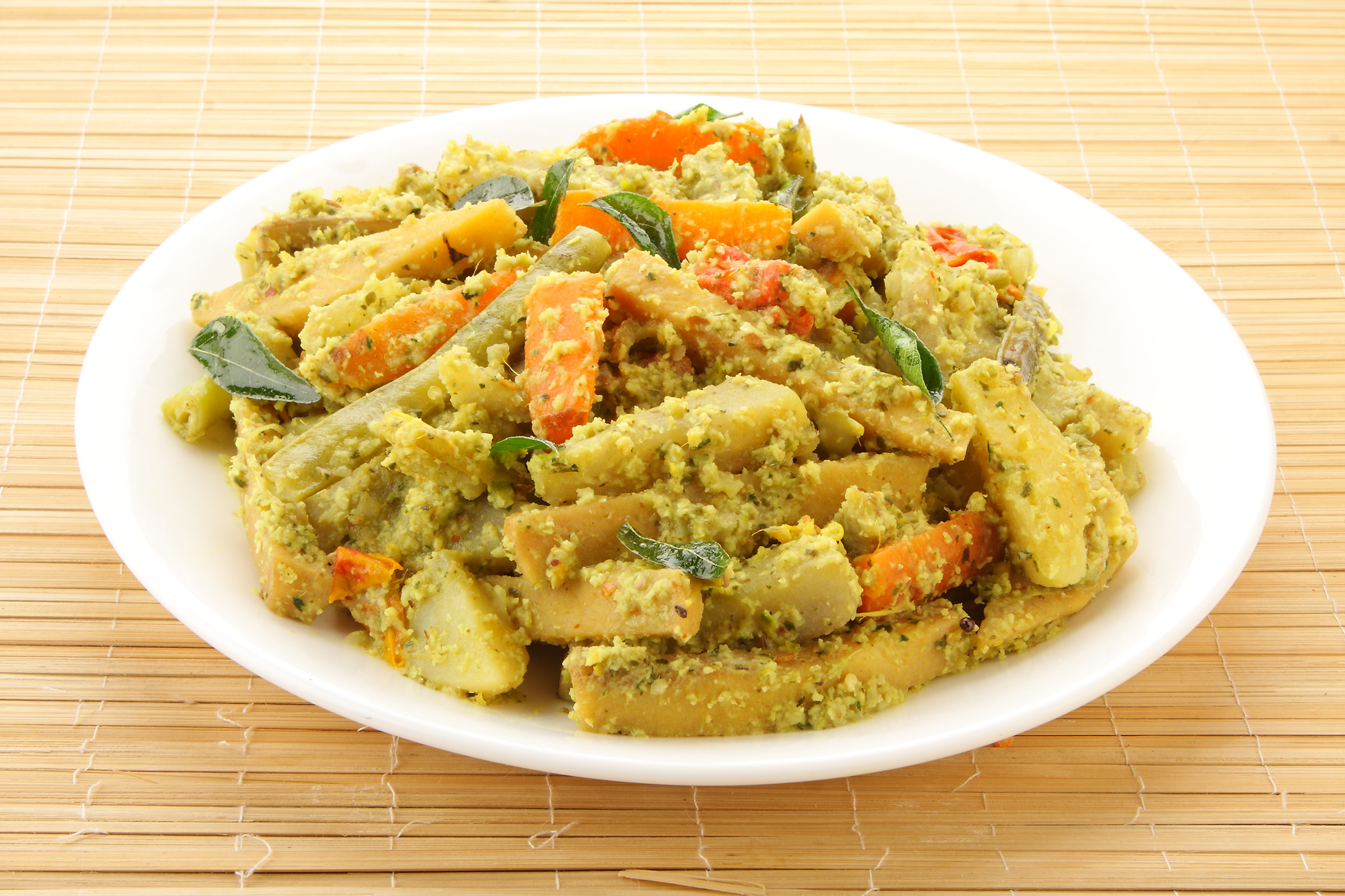
- Place of origin: India
- Region or state: Tamil Nadu; Kerala
- Associated cuisine: Tamil cuisine Kerala cuisine
- Main ingredients: Vegetables, Coconut, Curd

Avial or aviyal is an Indian dish originating from southern India. It is a thick stew of usually 13 vegetables commonly found in the Western Ghats and coconut, seasoned with coconut oil and curry leaves. Avial is considered an essential part of the main meal in Kerala (oonu in Malayalam) and Tamil Nadu, often the star dish in a traditional Kerala Sadhya and is also served as a delicacy in South India. Saying something is an avial is also a common phrase attributing that thing to being a mess.

Central Travancore has a slightly different variety of avial with its thin gravy; whereas the classic avial is thick.

== Ingredients ==
Generally, only crisp vegetables are used in avial. Vegetables commonly used in avial are elephant foot yam, plantain, ash melon (wax gourd), carrots, beans, brinjal (aubergine), cucumber, drumstick pods, snake gourd and broad bean, etc. are the recent introduction, while the Avial from the Kozhikode region includes bitter gourd. Variants of avial from the Kollam region also includes tomato among other vegetables. Some people prefer to skip curd or replace it with raw mango or tamarind pulp. This dish can be made into a gravy or be made into a semi-dry side dish. It is generally eaten with rice. The word "avial" is also used to denote 'boiled' or 'cooked in water' — this sense being derived from the way the dish is made.

== Mythology ==
Avial is believed to have been invented by the warrior Bhima during his exile. According to the legend, when Ballava (Bhima's name during this time) assumed his duties as the cook in the kitchen of Virata, he did not know how to cook. One of the first things he did was to chop up many different vegetables, boil them together and top the dish with grated coconut. There are mythological variations. Bhima is said to have prepared Avial, when there were unexpected guests for King Virata and he needed to serve meals for them. There were no sufficient vegetables to cook any single recipe for a side dish, so Bheema used whatever available vegetables to make a new dish, which came to be known as Avial.

Another narrative version relates to the attempt made by Kauravas to kill Bhima. After poisoning Bhima, Kauravas tied Bhima and threw him into the water. Kauravas also communicated that they saw Bhima drowning in water. With the completion of the days of mourning, a funeral feast was planned and preparation were underway. Unexpectedly, Bhima emerged from the water, rescued by the Nagas. With this, preparations for the feast was cancelled. However, Bhima was unhappy with this decision, and decided to mix all of the vegetables to prepare a new dish which later became popular as Avial.

Another popular old story is that in the Kingdom of Travancore in Kerala there was a great feast held by the king. Every one in the kingdom came to eat so there was a shortage of curry to be served. But in the kitchen also stocks were less so when the king visited the kitchen he found that a lot of vegetables were wasted when they were peeled. The king ordered the cook to make a curry with this along with some other ingredients so Avial was born. The king also ordered it to be served as the first item. Hence Avial is the first to be served on a Sadhya.

== See also ==
- Sadya
- Cuisine of Kerala
- South Indian cuisine
