= Banana flour =

Flour traditionally made of green bananas

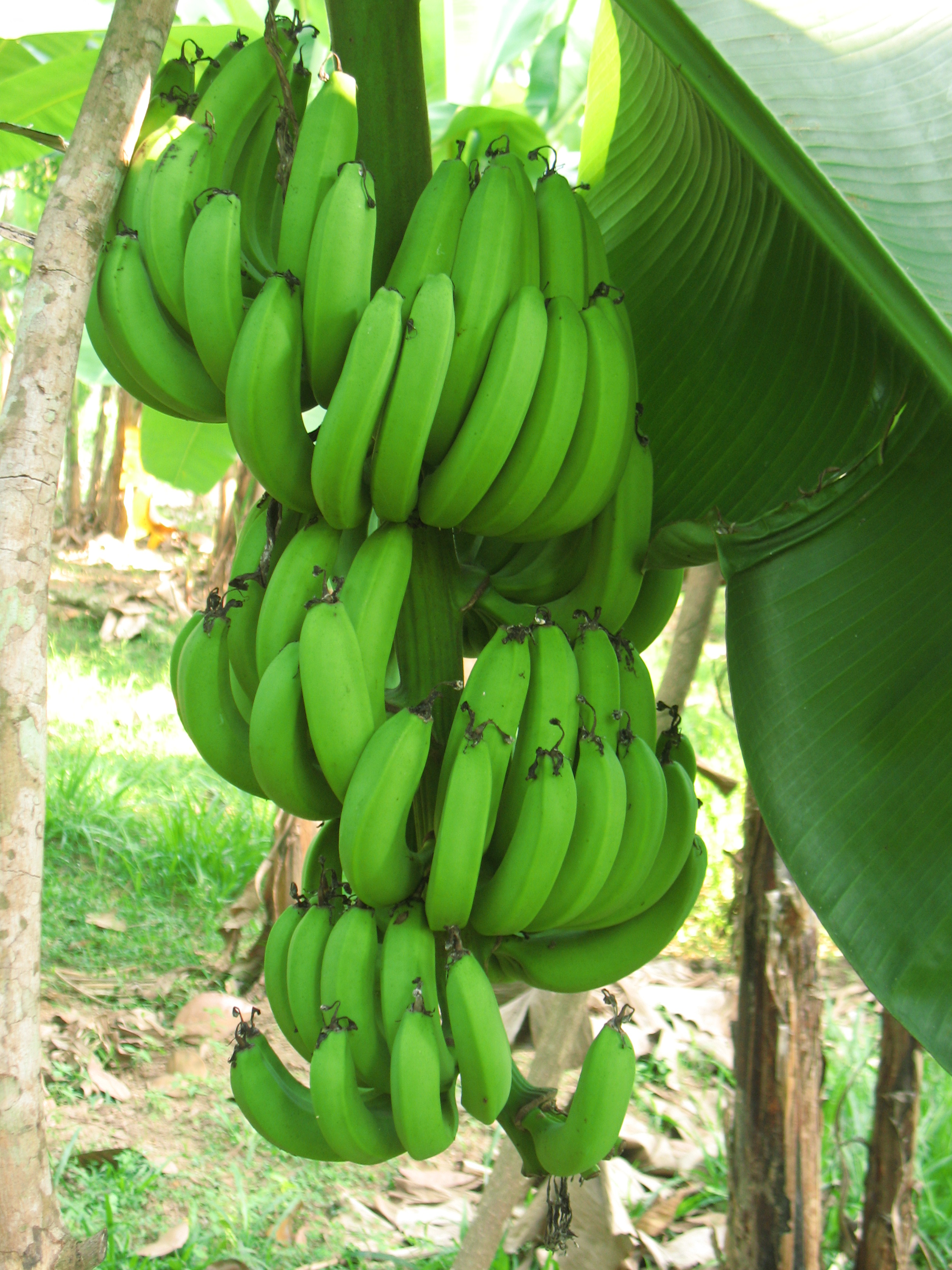
- Green bananas, raw material for making banana flour

Banana flour is a powder traditionally made of green bananas. Historically, banana flour has been used in Africa and Jamaica as a cheaper alternative to wheat flour. It is now often used as a gluten-free replacement for wheat flours or as a source of resistant starch, which has been promoted by certain dieting trends such as paleo and primal diets and by some recent nutritional research. Banana flour, due to the use of green bananas, has a very mild banana flavor when raw, and when cooked, it has an earthy, nonbanana flavor; it also has a texture reminiscent of lighter wheat flours and requires about 25% less volume, making it a good replacement for white and white whole-wheat flour.

== Production methods ==
Banana flour is generally produced with green bananas that are peeled, chopped, dried, and then ground. This process can be completed traditionally by hand, where the bananas are sun dried, dried in an oven, or a residential food dryer, and then either ground in a mortar and pestle or with a mechanical grinder. The green banana process requires 8–10 kg of raw green bananas to produce 1 kg of banana flour. In recent years, large scale commercial production has begun in Africa and South America using the same basic methodology.

Chile has been developing an alternative method of banana flour production using ripe banana waste. Chilean researchers have developed a process that uses over-ripe banana peels to add dietary fiber to the ripe banana fruit, which does not have the resistant starch properties of green bananas. Banana powder is made from dried and ground fully ripened banana puree and thus does not have the fiber of banana peel flour content nor the resistant starch of green banana flour.

== Uses ==
Historical use

Traditionally, banana flour was produced as an alternative to high-priced wheat flour in various parts of Africa and Jamaica. As early as 1900, banana flour was sold in Central America under the brand-name Musarina and marketed as beneficial for those with stomach problems and pains. During World War I, the U.S. Department of Agriculture considered plans to produce banana flour as a substitute for wheat and rye flours.

Gluten-free alternative

Banana flour has been imported or produced by American and Australian firms, International Agriculture Group, and Natural Evolution. These flours are marketed as a gluten-free alternative to wheat-based flours for those suffering from celiac disease and those who choose a gluten-free diet. They are also marketed for clean-label texturizers and as a natural source of resistant starch. Because of the high starch content, banana flour has excellent cooking/baking characteristics that allow it to replace wheat and other flours. However, even in cooked products like pasta (banoodles), the addition of banana flour increased total resistant starch content in appreciable amounts.

Resistant starch

Banana flour (green variety) has gained the attention of nutritional researchers and dieters as an excellent and useful source of resistant starch. Resistant starch refers starch that resists digestion - it is not broken down in the small intestine, but reaches the large intestine, where it functions as a fermentable dietary fiber. Banana flour may have a high resistant starch content (>60%) or it may have a low resistant starch content (<10%), depending upon the drying procedures of the specific ingredient. Banana flour is often used raw, for example as an ingredient in smoothies or nutrition bars, because cooking may reduce the resistant starch content.

Animal feed and glue manufacturing

Banana flour is used as animal feed in various parts of the world. In particular, it is used as an ingredient in milk replacers for calves. Dynasty Banana Flour Manufacturing and Trading in the Philippines and Taj Agro Products in India export banana flour worldwide for use in livestock feeds (where it acts as a coagulant) and for use in glue production, mainly plywood glue.

== Availability ==
Banana flour has traditionally been available in Africa and South America, both from traditional and commercial production. It has been introduced as a commercial ingredient around the world by companies such as International Agriculture Group (based in the United States) and Natural Evolution (based in Australia).

== Environmental and economic benefits ==
Banana flour production has been offered as a solution to high rates of waste among banana crops by both researchers and officials of various countries. Many unripe green bananas are culled and thrown out as unsuitable for sale or export. These culled green bananas are still suitable for banana flour production, and if used for this purpose, would significantly reduce waste in banana production. Thus, banana producers will be able to secure greater returns from their crops, the environmental impact of those crops would be reduced, and world food production would be increased as a once-wasted foodstuff would now be used. Chilean officials have started production of an overripe banana flour made from overripe banana peels and the overripe banana fruit. This reduces waste by using bananas typically thrown out when unsold or accidentally over-ripened, which can occur to as much as 20% of bananas brought to market. In these ways, banana flour can reduce waste on both ends of banana crop production.

== Production concerns ==
Banana production has long been associated with the exploitation of impoverished workers in third-world countries. Banana flour production is naturally and closely connected with these concerns, as some consumers worry about where the bananas going into their flour are sourced. However, many major banana producers have recently agreed to fair trade business practices, which have been shown to increase worker welfare.

== See also ==
- List of banana dishes
