= Tufa =

Porous variety of limestone rock

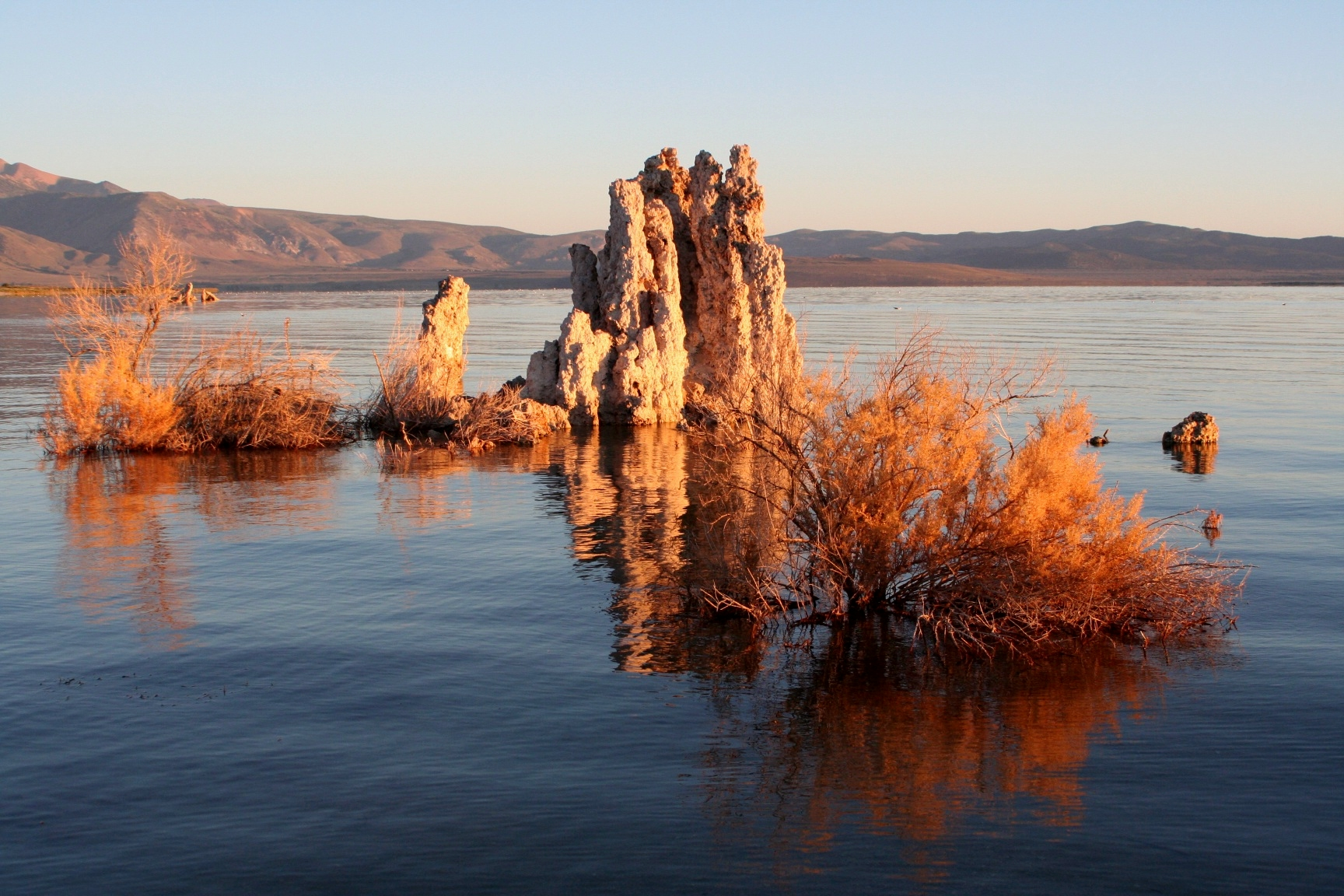
Tufa columns at Mono Lake, California

Tufa (tuft, calc-tuff or tophus) is a variety of limestone formed when carbonate minerals precipitate out of water in unheated rivers or lakes. Geothermally heated hot springs sometimes produce similar (but less porous) carbonate deposits, which are known as travertine or thermogene travertine. Tufa is sometimes referred to as meteogene travertine.

== Classification and features ==
Modern and fossil tufa deposits abound with wetland plants; as such, many tufa deposits are characterised by their large macrobiological component, and are highly porous. Tufa forms either in fluvial channels or in lacustrine environments. Ford and Pedley (1996) provide a review of tufa systems worldwide.

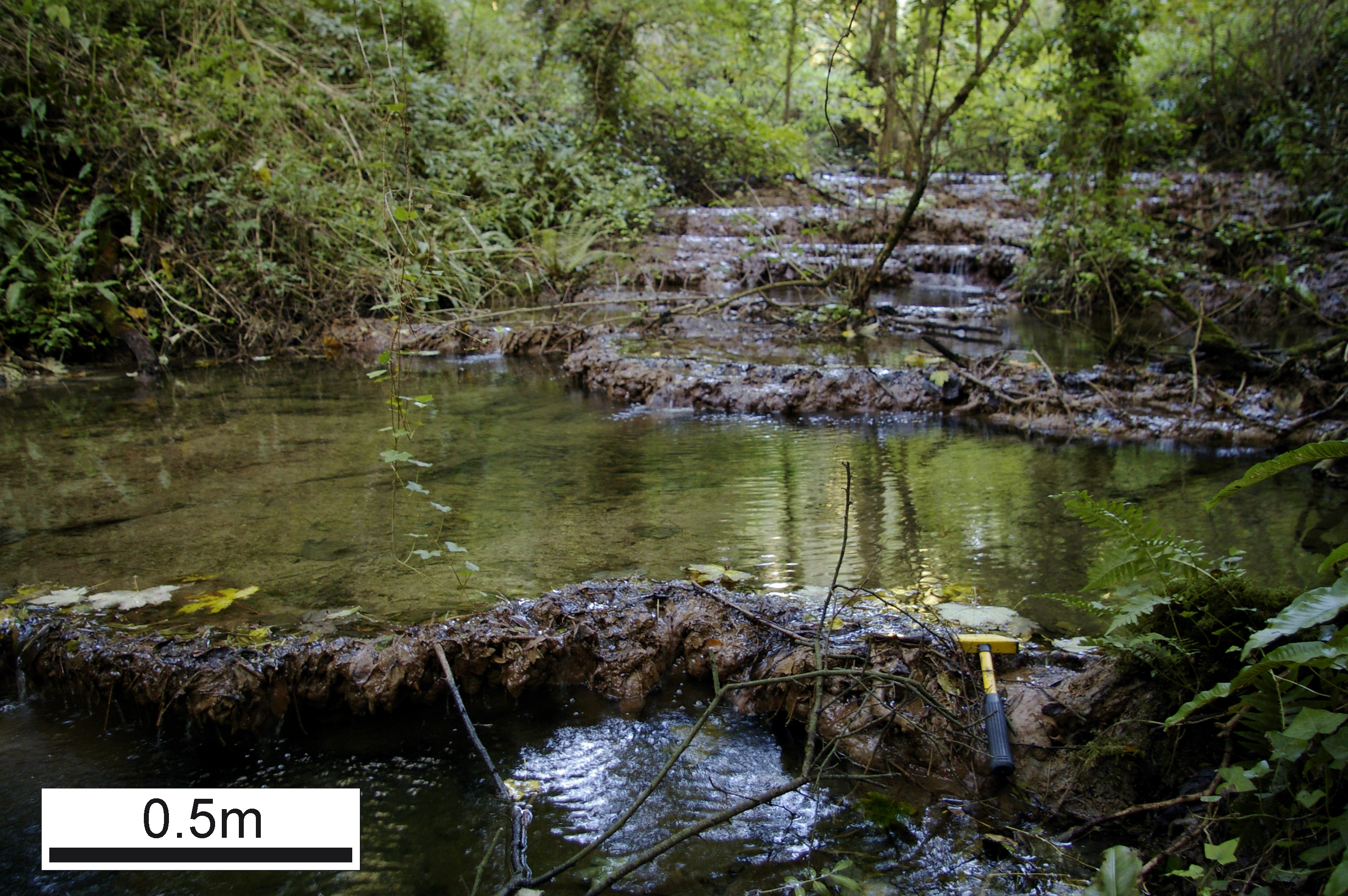
Barrage Tufa at Cwm Nash, South Wales

=== Fluvial deposits ===
Deposits can be classified by their depositional environment (or otherwise by vegetation or petrographically). Pedley (1990) provides an extensive classification system, which includes the following classes of fluvial tufa:

- Spring – Deposits form on emergence from a spring/seep. Morphology can vary from mineratrophic wetlands to spring aprons (see calcareous sinter)
- Braided channel – Deposits form within a fluvial channel, dominated by oncoids (see oncolite)
- Cascade – Deposits form at waterfalls, deposition is focused here due to accelerated flow (see Geochemistry)
- Barrage – Deposits form as a series of phytoherm barrages across a channel, which may grow up to several metres in height. Barrages often contain a significant detrital component, composed of organic material (leaf litter, branches etc.).

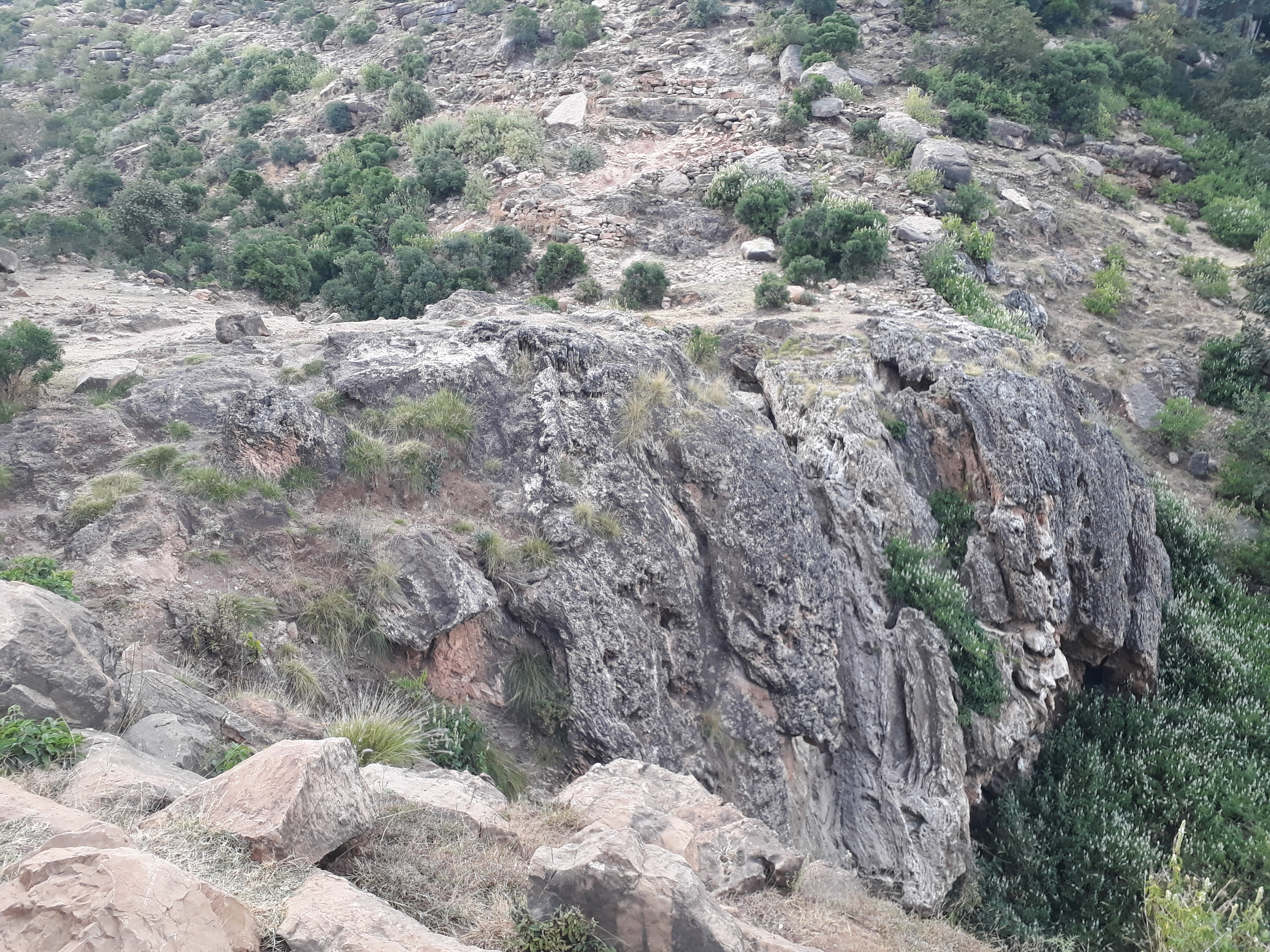
Rubaksa tufa plug, after drying of the river, in Ethiopia

=== Lacustrine deposits ===
Lacustrine tufas are generally formed at the periphery of lakes and built-up phytoherms (freshwater reefs), and on stromatolites. Oncoids are also common in these environments.

=== Calcareous sinter ===
Although sometimes regarded as a distinct carbonate deposit, calcareous sinter formed from ambient temperature water can be considered a sub-type of tufa.

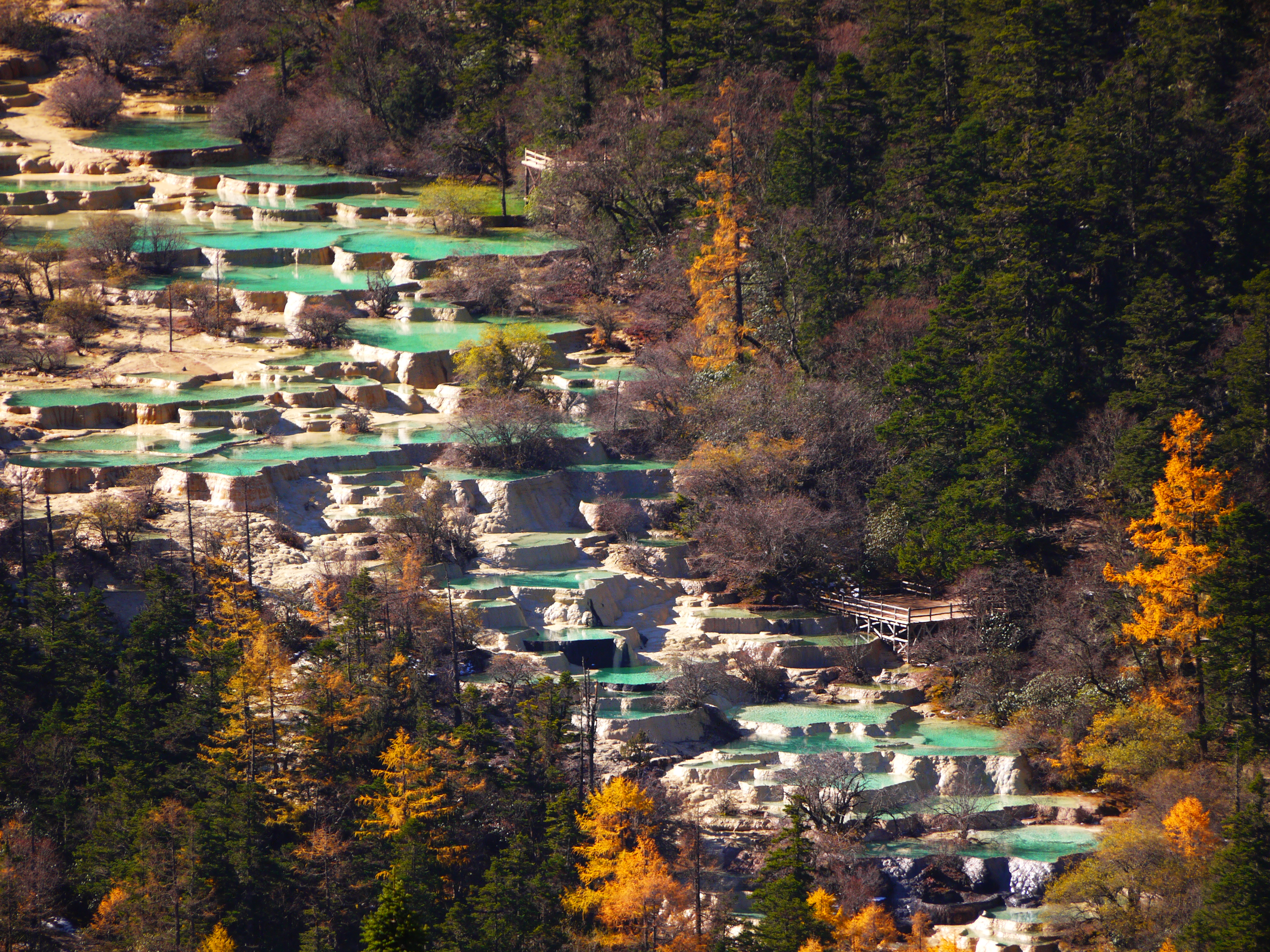
Tufa deposits at Huanglong, Sichuan, China

=== Speleothems ===
Calcareous speleothems may be regarded as a form of calcareous sinter. They lack any significant macrophyte component due to the absence of light, and for this reason they are often morphologically closer to travertine or calcareous sinter.

=== Columns ===
Tufa columns are an unusual form of tufa typically associated with saline lakes. They are distinct from most tufa deposits in that they lack any significant macrophyte component, due to the salinity excluding mesophilic organisms. Some tufa columns may actually form from hot-springs, and may therefore constitute a form of travertine. It is generally thought that such features form from CaCO_{3} precipitated when carbonate rich source waters emerge into alkaline soda lakes. They have also been found in marine settings in the Ikka fjord of Greenland where the Ikaite columns can reach up to 18 m (59 ft) in height.

== Biology ==
Tufa deposits form an important habitat for a diverse flora. Bryophytes (mosses, liverworts etc.) and diatoms are well represented. The porosity of the deposits creates a wet habitat ideal for these plants.

== Geochemistry ==
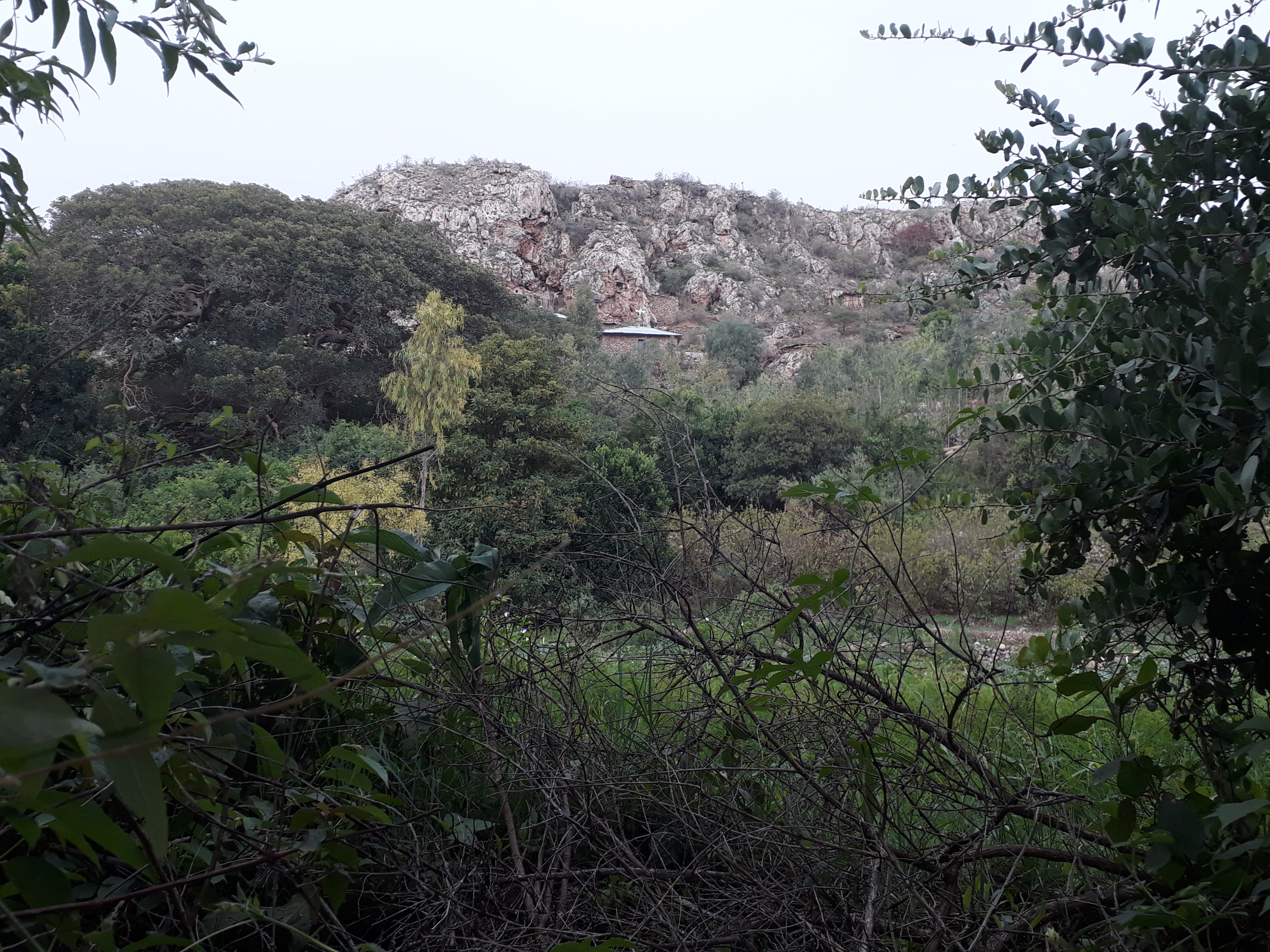
Tufa dam in Chelekwot, Ethiopia

Modern tufa is formed from alkaline waters, supersaturated with calcite. On emergence, waters degas CO_{2} due to the lower atmospheric pCO_{2} (see partial pressure), resulting in an increase in pH. Since carbonate solubility decreases with increased pH, precipitation is induced. Supersaturation may be enhanced by factors leading to a reduction in pCO_{2}, for example increased air-water interactions at waterfalls may be important, as may photosynthesis.

Recently it has been demonstrated that microbially induced precipitation may be more important than physico-chemical precipitation. Pedley et al. (2009) showed with flume experiments that precipitation does not occur unless a biofilm is present, despite supersaturation.

Calcite is the dominant mineral precipitate, followed by the polymorph aragonite.

== Occurrence ==
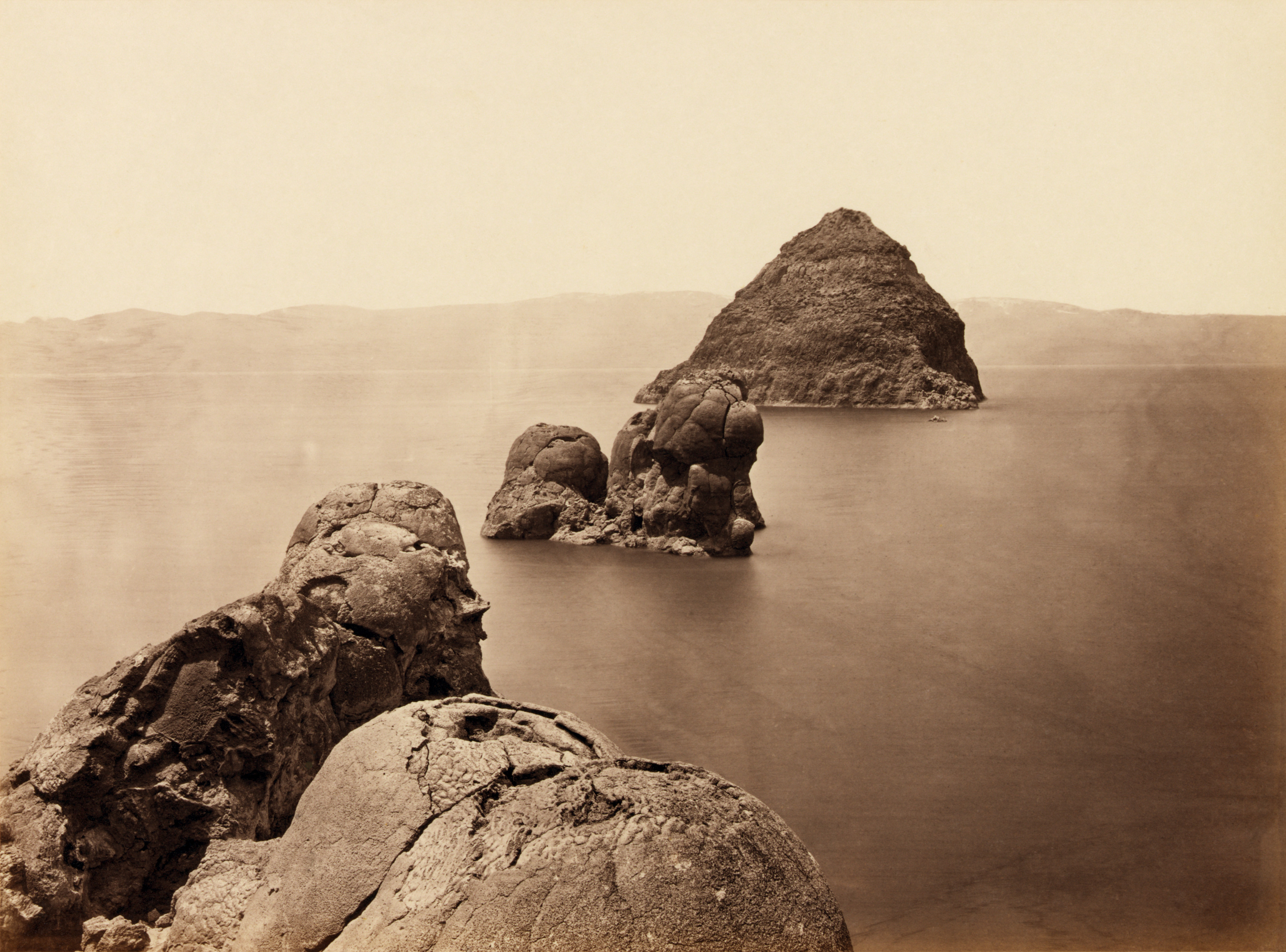
The Pyramid and Domes tufa rock structures, Pyramid Lake, Nevada

Tufa is common in many parts of the world including:

- Pyramid Lake, Nevada, US – tufa formations
- Big Soda Lake, Nevada, US – tufa formations only a century old
- Mono Lake, California, US – tufa columns
- Trona Pinnacles, California, US – tufa columns
- Sitting Bull Falls, New Mexico, US - tufa waterfall
- Matlock Bath, Derbyshire, United Kingdom
- North Dock Tufa, United Kingdom
- Basturs Lakes, Pallars Jussà, Catalonia – tufa mounds
- Various parts of Armenia, such as Artik
- Giwining / Flora River Nature Park in the Northern Territory, Australia.
- The southwestern coastline of Western Australia
- The Madikwe Game Reserve in the North West Province, South Africa
- The Kadishi tufa fall, Blyde River Canyon Nature Reserve, Mpumalanga Province, South Africa
- Various parts of southern Italy.

Some sources suggest that "tufa" was used as the primary building material for most of the châteaux of the Loire Valley, France. This results from a mis-translation of the terms "tuffeau jaune" and "tuffeau blanc", which are porous varieties of the Late Cretaceous marine limestone known as chalk.

=== Dinaric karst watercourses ===
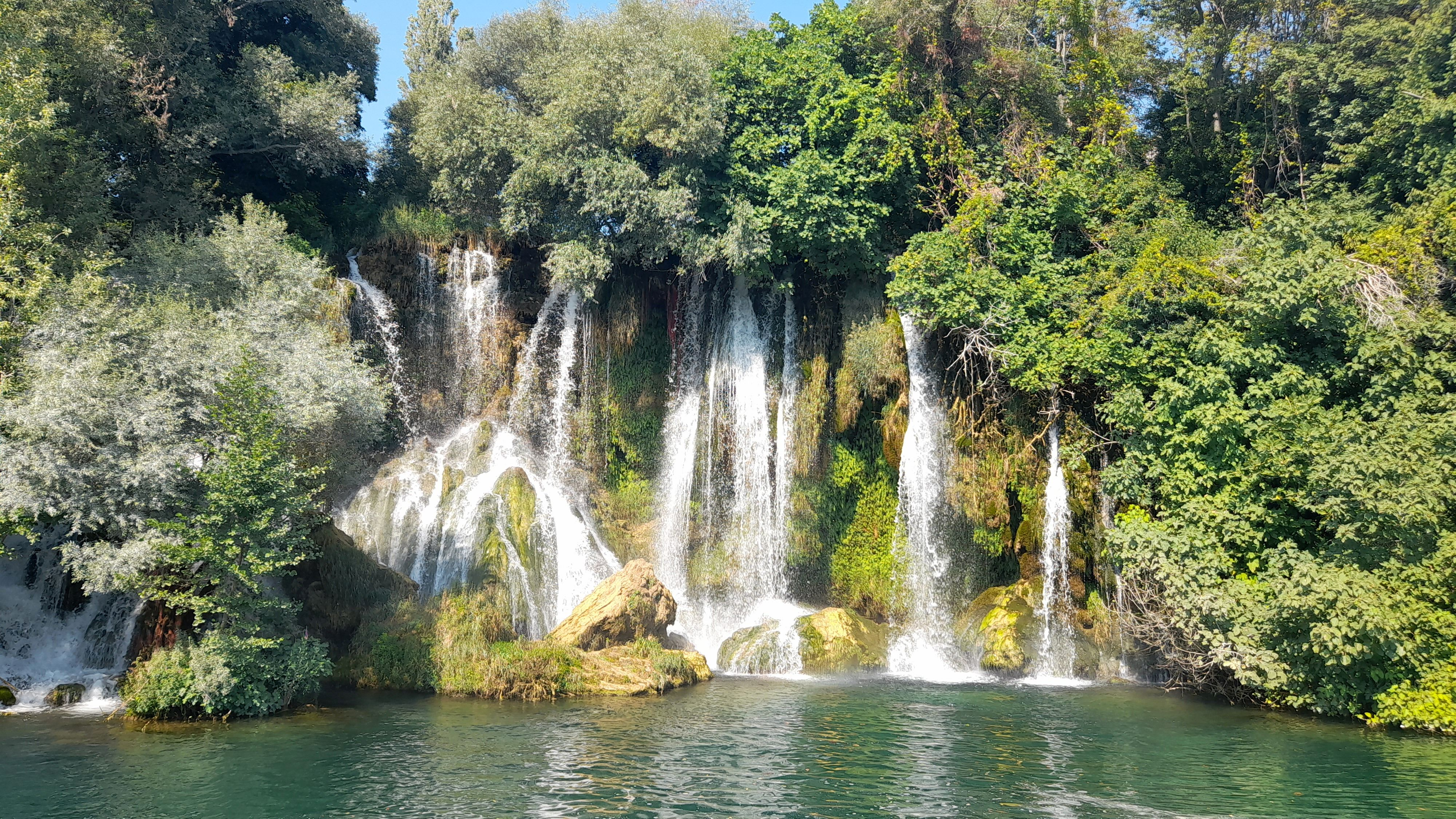
National Park Krka

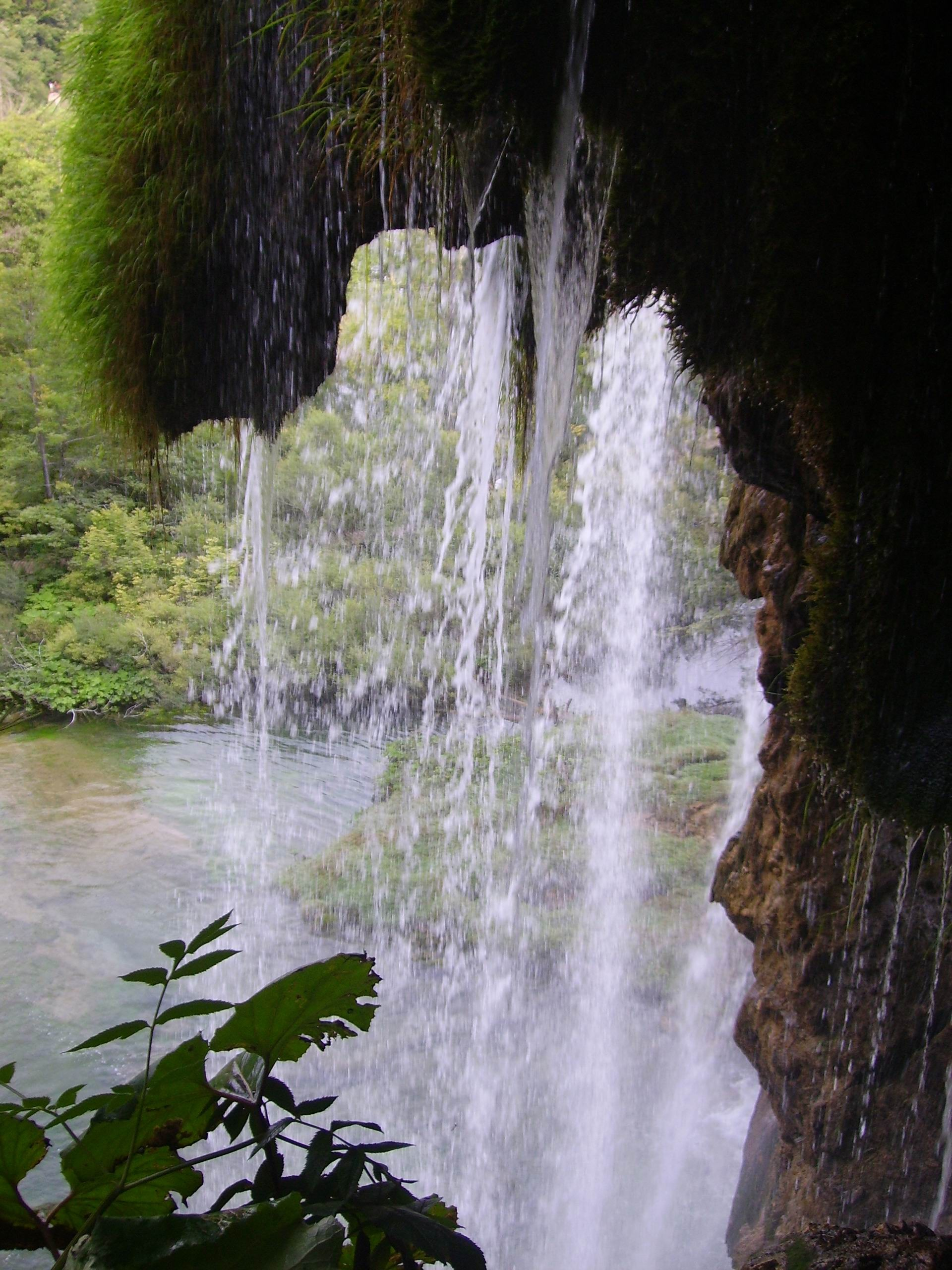
Tufa on Plitvice waterfalls

- Krka, Slovenia
- Una river, Bosnia and Herzegovina
- Pliva, Bosnia and Herzegovina
- Trebižat, Bosnia and Herzegovina
- Buna, Bosnia and Herzegovina
- Bregava, Bosnia and Herzegovina
- Plitvice Lakes National Park, Croatia
- Krka, Croatia
- Zrmanja with Krupa tributary, Croatia
- Kupa, Croatia and Slovenia

== Uses ==
Tufa is occasionally shaped into a planter. Its porous consistency makes it ideal for alpine gardens. A concrete mixture called hypertufa is used for similar purposes.

In the 4th century BC, tufa was used to build Roman walls up to 10m high and 3.5m thick. The soft stone allows for easy sculpting. Tufa masonry was used in cemeteries, such as the one in Cerveteri.

== See also ==
- List of types of limestone – Limestone deposits listed by location
