= Banana chips =

Chip made of banana

Banana chip
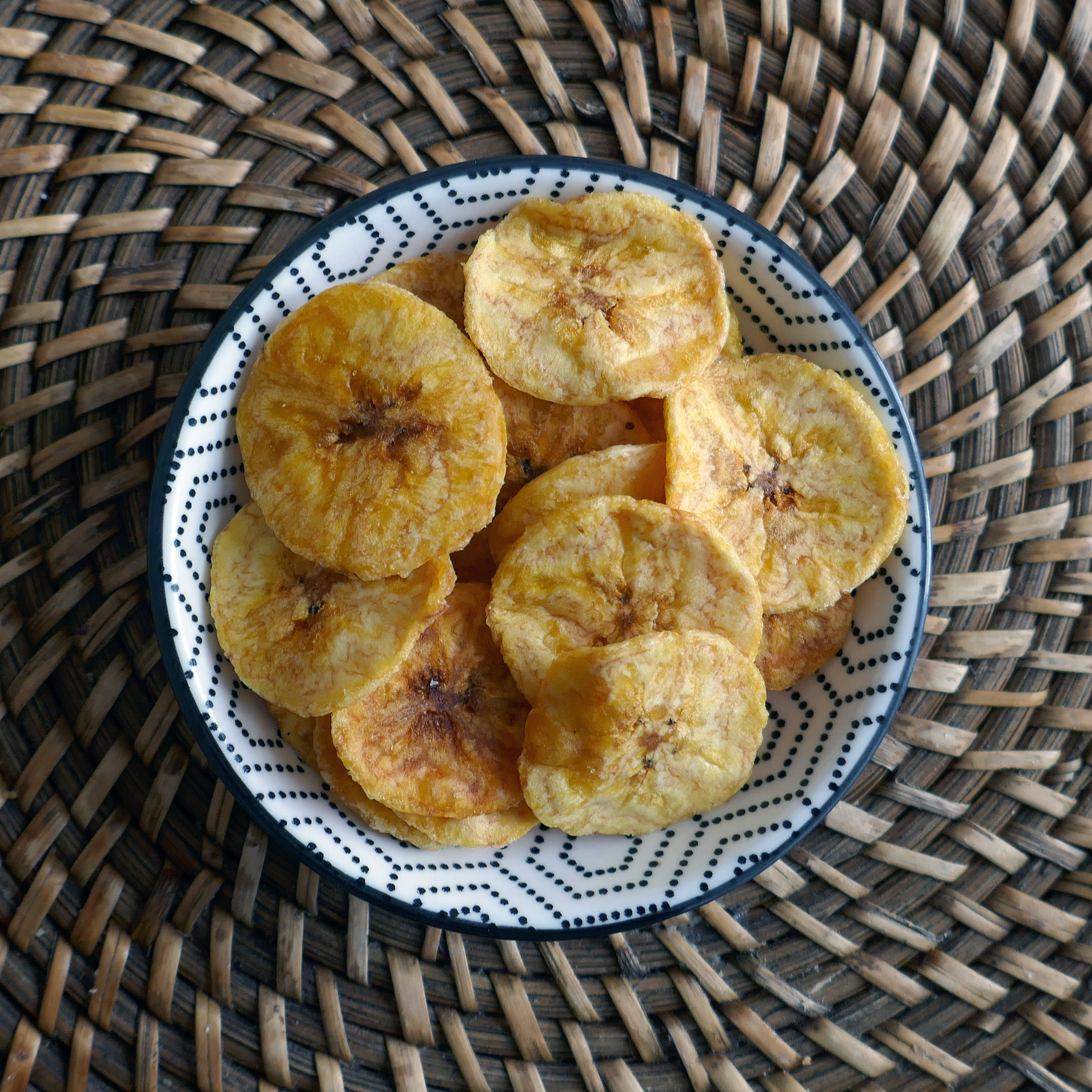
- Type: Crisps
- Course: Deep-fried snack, side dish
- Serving temperature: Room temperature

Banana chips
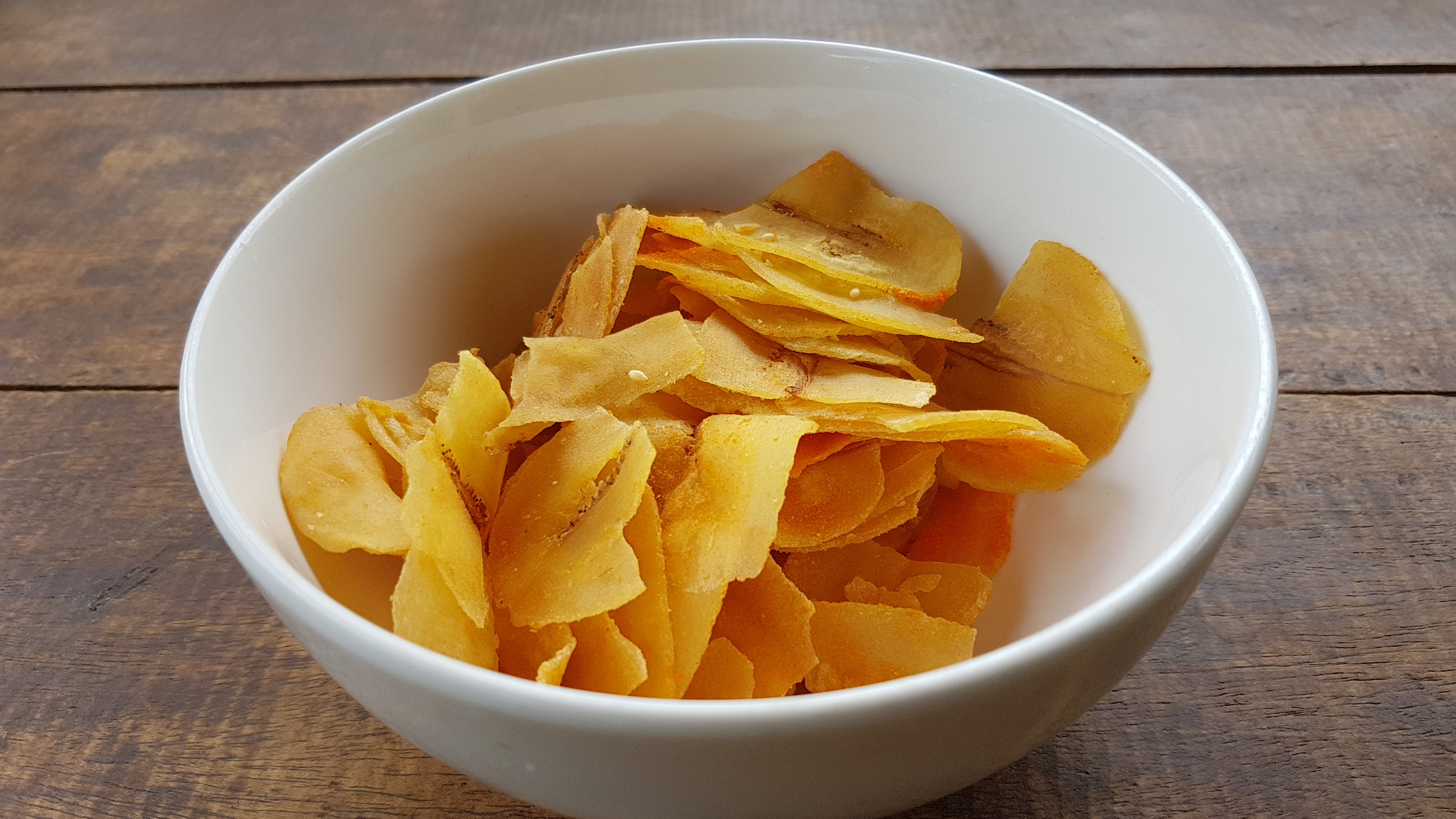
- Banana chips from the Philippines

Nutritional value per 100g
- Energy: 2,170 kJ (520 kcal)
- Carbohydrates: 58.40g
- Sugars: 35.34g
- Dietary fiber: 7.7g
- Fat: 33.60g
- Saturated: 28.970g
- Monounsaturated: 1.950g
- Polyunsaturated: 0.630g
- Protein: 2.30g
Vitamins and minerals
Vitamins	Quantity %DV^{†}
Vitamin A equiv.	0% 4 μg
Vitamin A	83 IU
Thiamine (B1)	7% 0.085 mg
Riboflavin (B2)	1% 0.017 mg
Niacin (B3)	4% 0.710 mg
Vitamin B6	15% 0.260 mg
Folate (B9)	4% 14 μg
Vitamin C	7% 6.3 mg
Vitamin E	2% 0.24 mg
Vitamin K	1% 1.3 μg
Minerals	Quantity %DV^{†}
Calcium	1% 18 mg
Copper	23% 0.205 mg
Iron	7% 1.25 mg
Magnesium	18% 76 mg
Phosphorus	4% 56 mg
Potassium	18% 536 mg
Sodium	0% 6 mg
Zinc	7% 0.75 mg
- Other constituents: Quantity
- Water: 4.3 g
- Link to USDA Database entry
- ^{†}Percentages estimated using US recommendations for adults, except for potassium, which is estimated based on expert recommendation from the National Academies.

A banana chip (sometimes called banana crisp) is a deep-fried or dried, generally crispy slice of banana. It is usually made from firmer, starchier banana varieties (cooking bananas or plantains) like the saba and Nendran cultivars. It can be sweet or savory and can be covered with sugar, honey, salt, or various spices.

Banana chips are the only processed banana product with significant international trade. The main exporter of banana chips worldwide is the Philippines. Export markets for banana chips are also established in India, Thailand, Indonesia and Malaysia.

== Fried ==
Fried banana chips are usually produced from under-ripe banana slices deep-fried in sunflower oil or coconut oil. These chips are dry (like potato chips), contain about 4% water (table), and can be salted, spiced, sugar-coated, or jaggery-coated. Sometimes, banana flavoring is added. If ripe dessert bananas are used, they come out soggy. They are used for desserts, not for dry chips.

== Dried ==
Some varieties of banana chips can be produced using only food dehydration. Banana slices that are only dehydrated are not dark yellow and crunchy but rather are brown, leathery, and chewy. They are very sweet and have an intense banana flavor. These are ideally made from fully ripe bananas. Another kind is made by baking it in an oven, although this process may not result in the same intense banana flavor.

== Nutrition ==
Dried banana chips are 4% water, 58% carbohydrates, 34% fat, and 2% protein. In a 100-gram reference amount, dried banana chips supply 520 calories and are a rich source (20% or more of the Daily Value, DV) of magnesium (21% DV) and vitamin B6 (20% DV), with moderate amounts of iron, copper, and potassium (10% to 11% DV) (table). Other micronutrients are in negligible amounts of the Daily Value (see nutrition table).

== Uses and variations ==
=== Philippines ===
The Philippines is, by far, the main exporter of banana chips worldwide. It exports large quantities to more than 30 countries, including the United States, Canada, the European Union, Japan, Australia, South Korea, China, and Russia. The annual revenue for banana chip exports in the Philippines was approximately $35 million in 2009. There are many variants of banana chips in the Philippines, from traditional dishes like pinasugbo to modern versions coated in cheese powder. Banana chips in the Philippines are made predominantly from saba or cardava bananas, with the latter preferred for commercial banana chips due to their larger sizes. For domestic production and home cooking, they are made directly by deep-frying fresh sliced bananas. For commercial banana chips for the export market, the main method of production is through osmotic dehydration followed by deep frying at 375 °F (191 °C) in coconut oil for 1 minute. The resulting chips are distinctively light-colored.

=== India ===
Fried plantain chips, known as nenthra-kaaya oopperi or vazhaykka upperi or upperi in Kerala, are fried in coconut oil. Both ripe and unripe plantains are used for this type of chip preparation. The chips may be coated with masala or jaggery to form spicy and sweet variations. Plain banana and plantain chips are called pachkkaya varuthathu and kaya upperi, respectively; sweet jaggery-banana chips are called sharkara upperi or sharkkara varatty. Sharkara varatty is more expensive than upperi. It is an integral part of the traditional Kerala meal called sadya served during weddings and festivals, such as Onam.

=== Indonesia ===
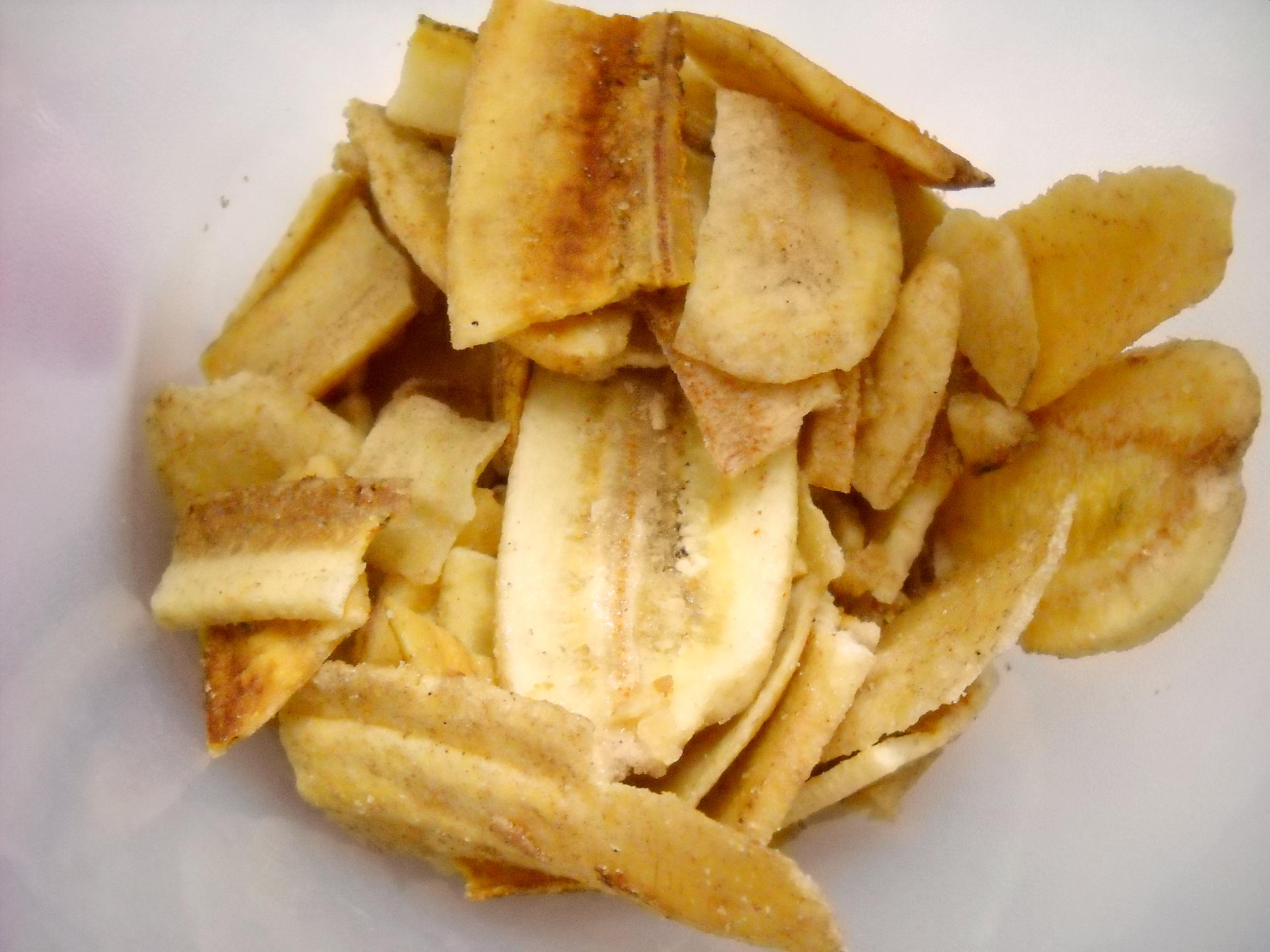
Indonesian kripik pisang (banana chips)

Bananas are native plants of Maritime Southeast Asia, and the people of the archipelago have developed many uses for them for ages, including as a snack. In Indonesia, a banana chip is called kripik pisang, and is considered a variant of crispy kripik (traditional chip or crisp). Kripik pisang is a popular crispy snack and can be commonly found in Indonesia, although it seems to be more prevalent in Java and Sumatra. In North Maluku, popular with pisang mulu bebek is a duck-mouth-shaped banana chip. It is served with sambal, fried peanut, and fried anchovy. In Lampung, banana chips is combined with chocolate powder called kripik pisang coklat.

Usually, unripe green bananas are thinly sliced, soaked in a lime and salt water solution, and deep-fried as chips. Unripe banana is well suited for deep frying due to its low content of water and sugar while having high starch content. Pisang goreng is another fried banana snack, although it is not thinly sliced and serves as a sweet hot snack.

=== Americas ===
The chips are often part of muesli and nut mixes. Other chips, such as patacones, are salty. Similar chips called chifle are made from plantains, the family of fruit that bananas come from. In tropical American cultures, all bananas are considered plantains, but not all plantains are bananas. These deep-fried plantain chips are also quite popular in the southeastern part of Mexico, especially in the state of Tabasco.

== Gallery ==
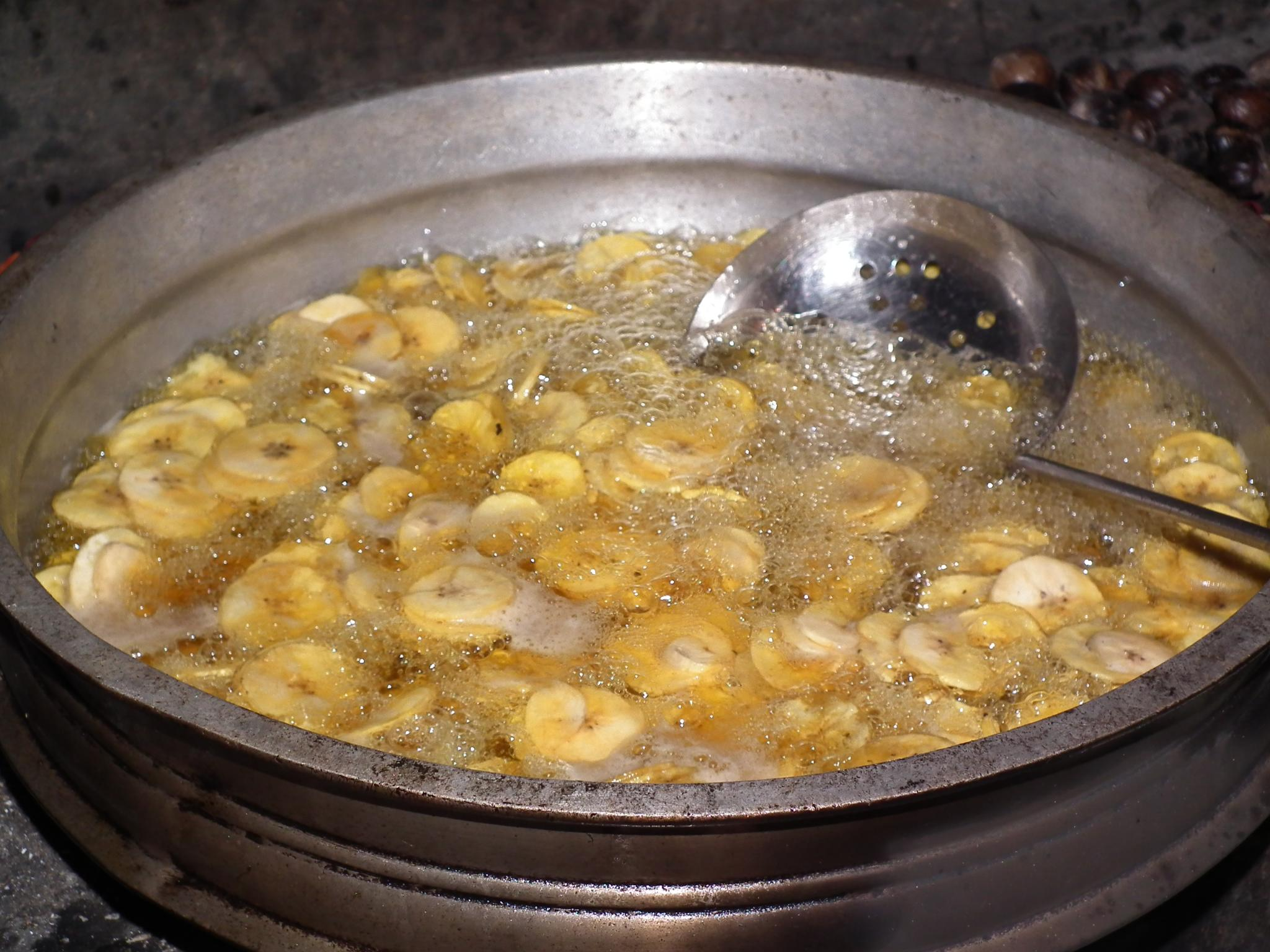
Banana chips being prepared by deep frying

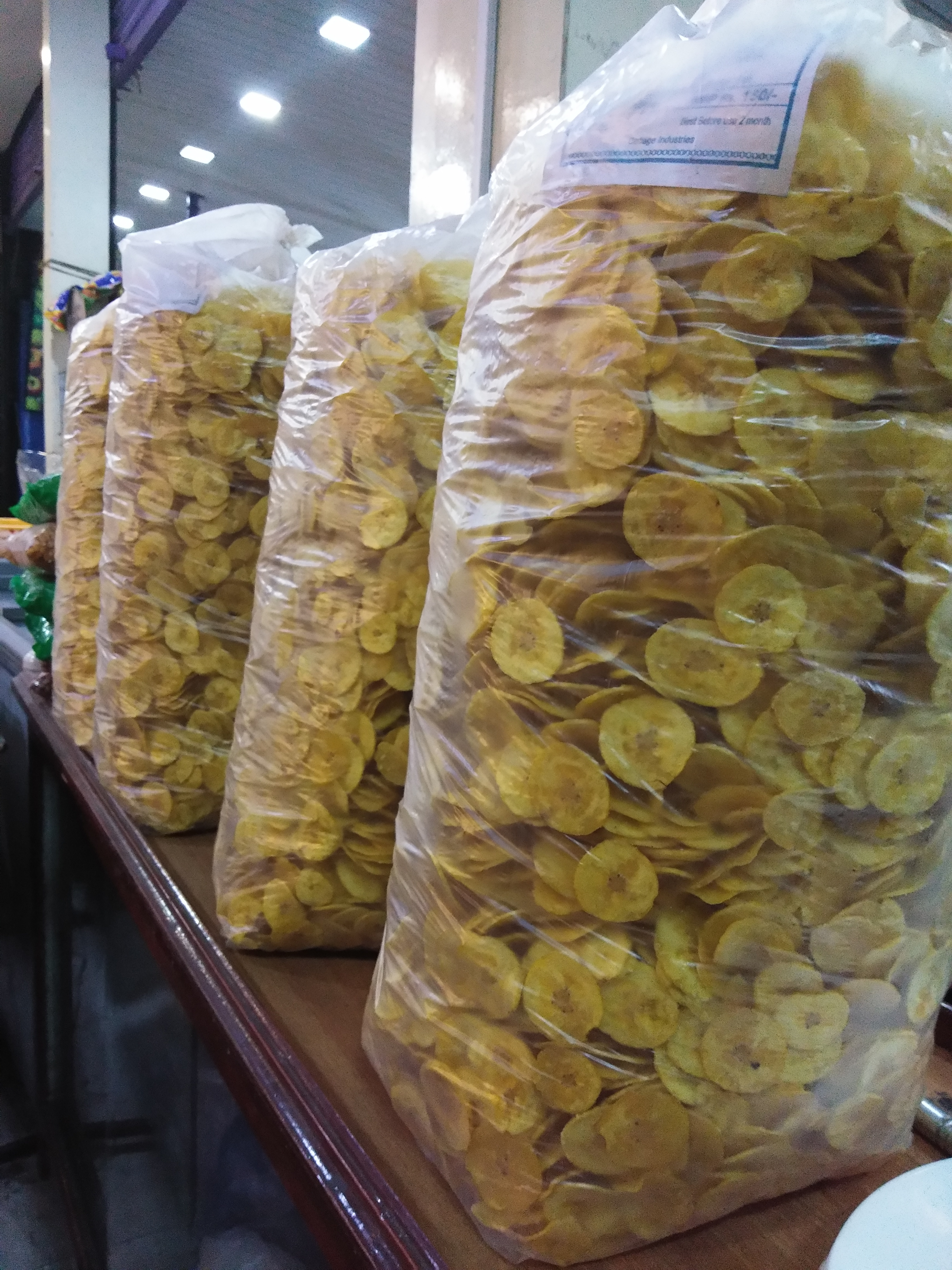
Fried banana chips

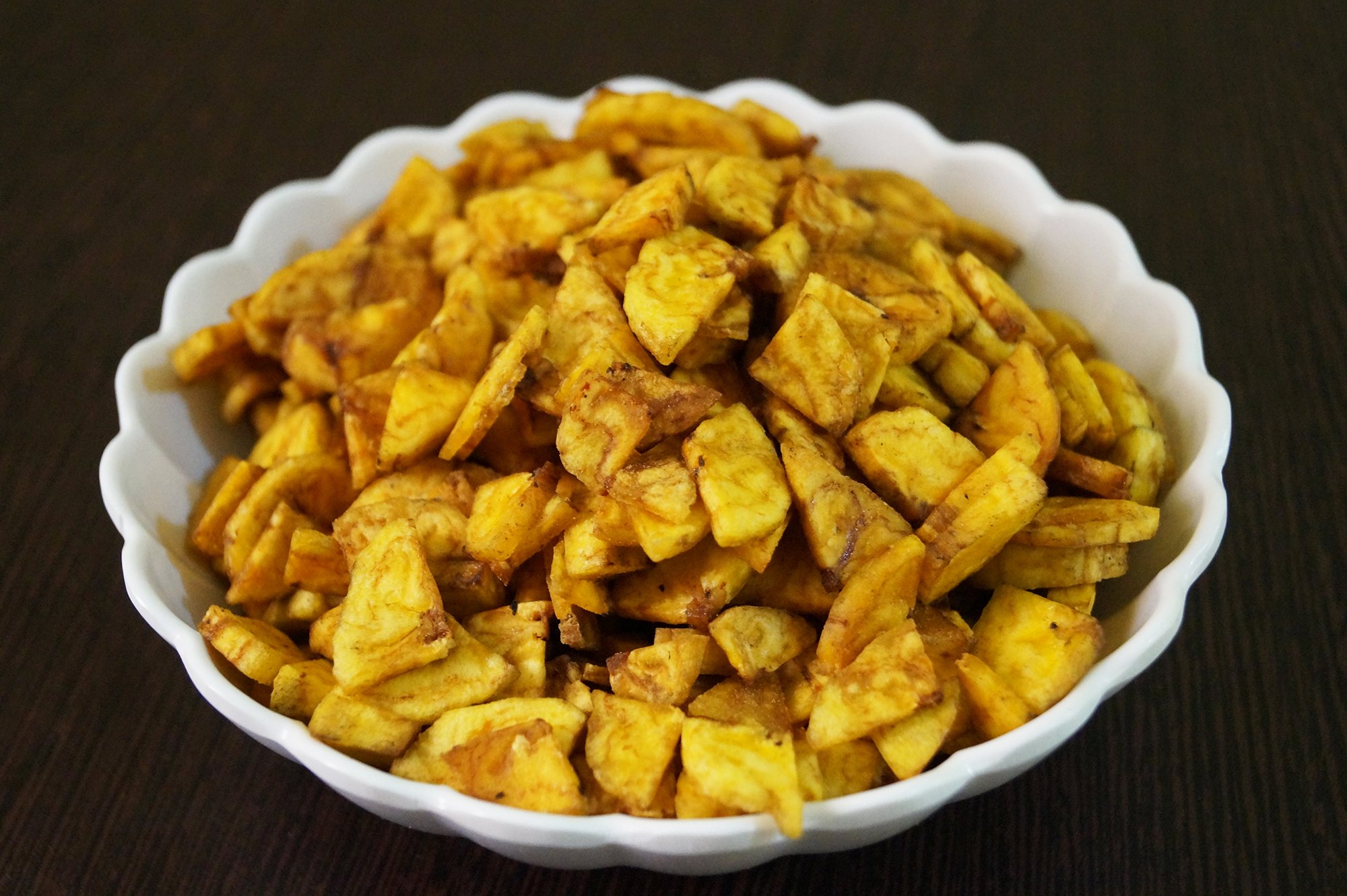
Homemade banana chips

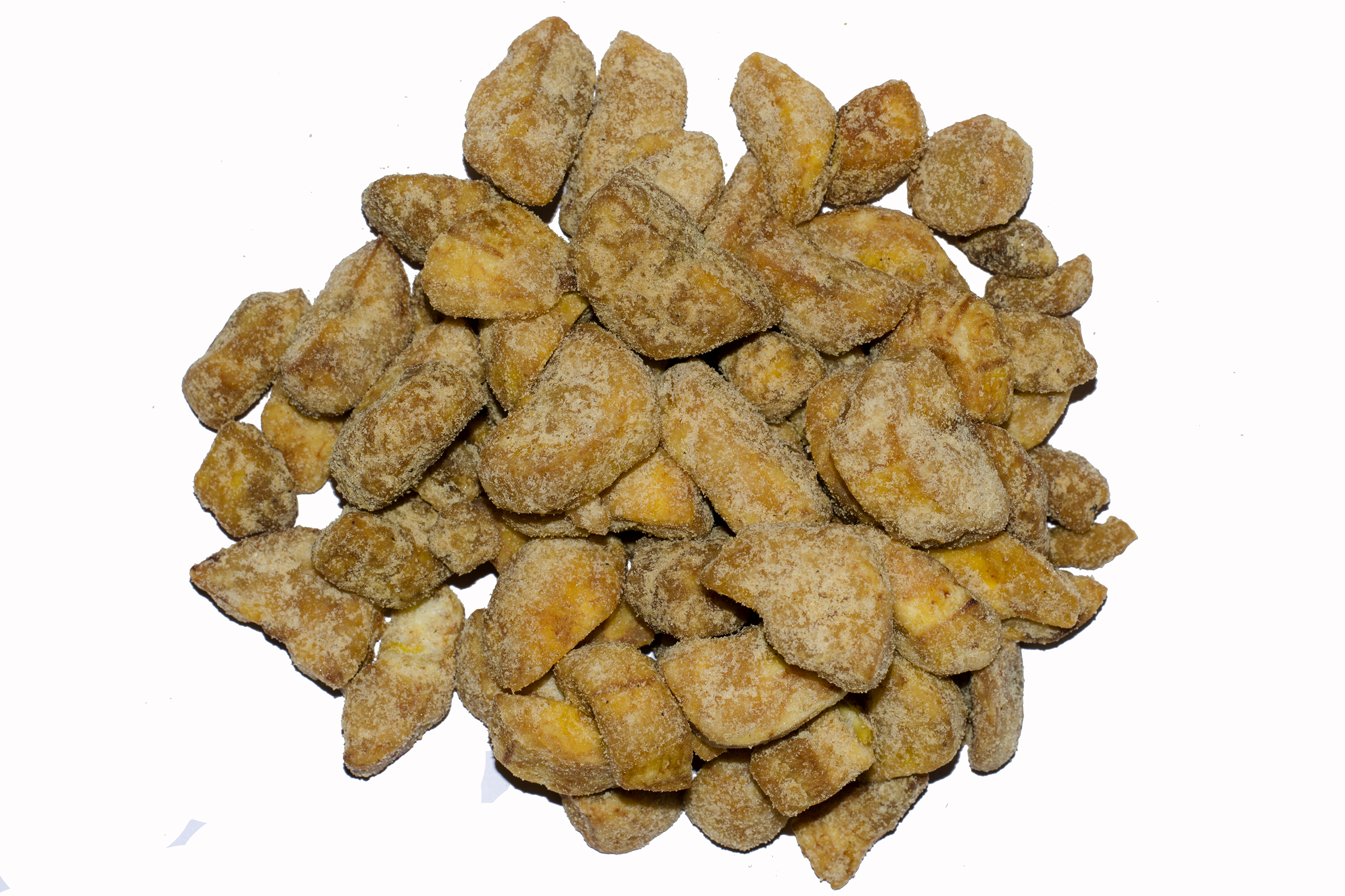
Jaggery chips

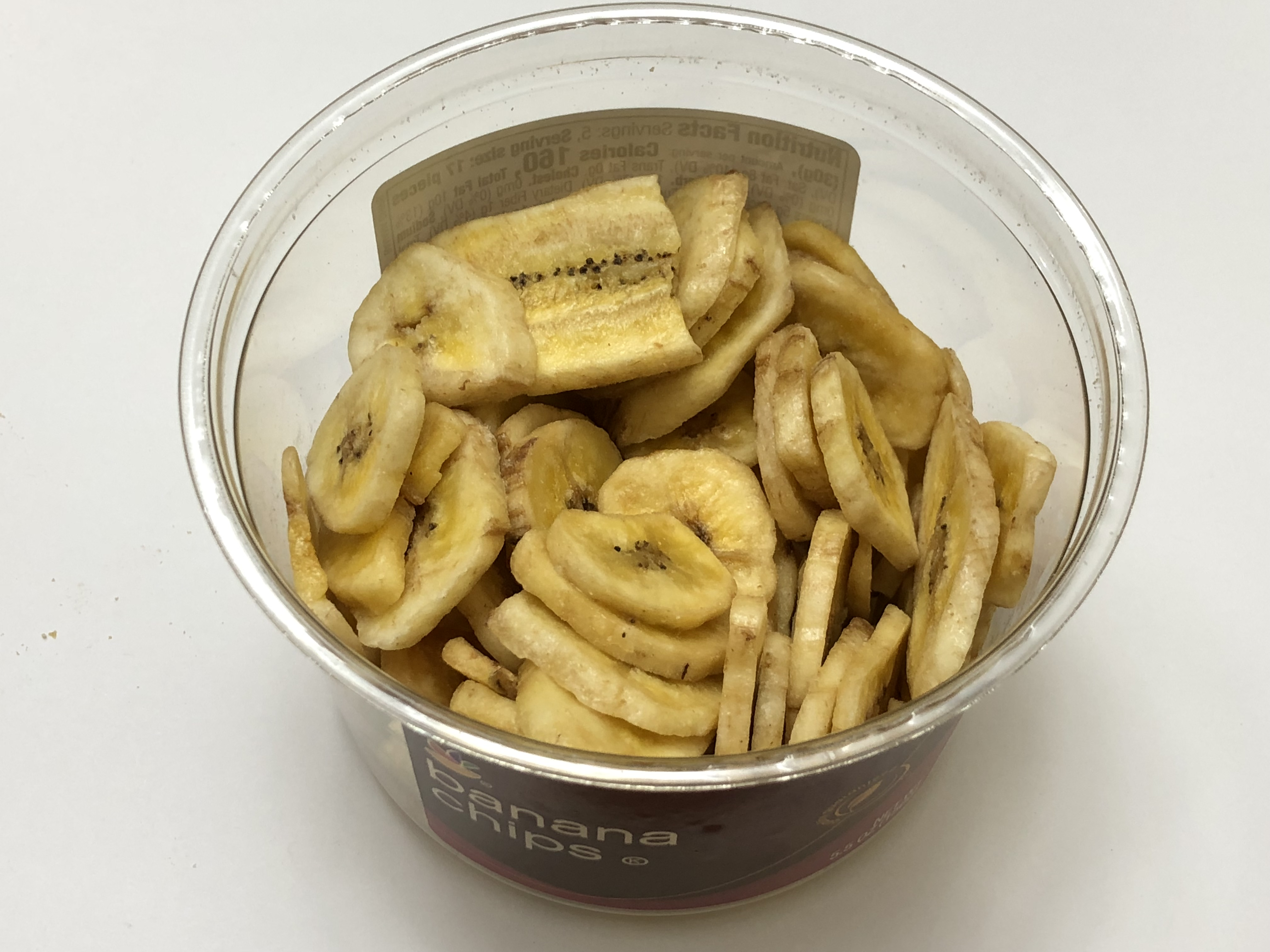
Dried banana chips

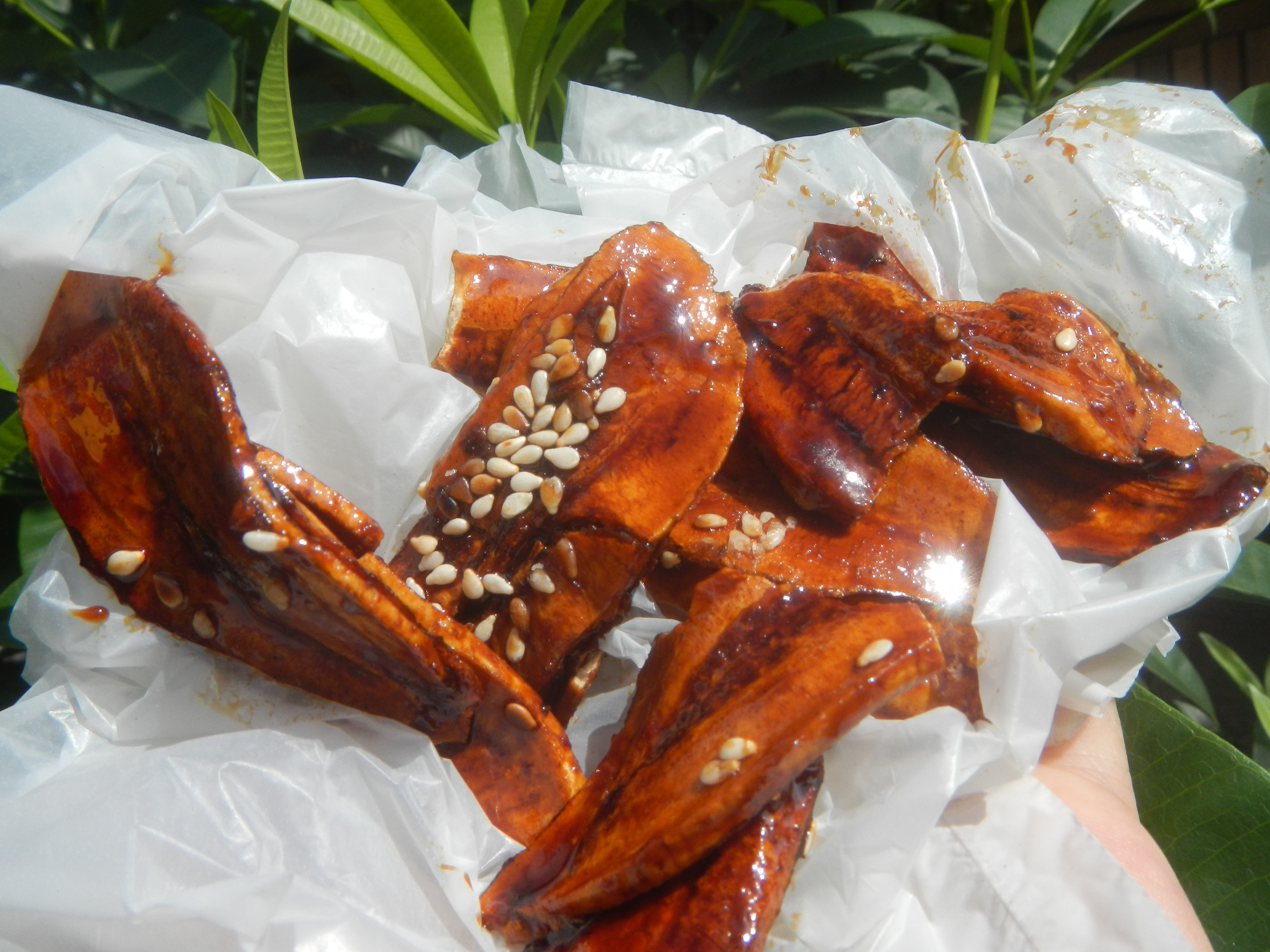
Pinasugbo, a traditional banana chip snack from the Western Visayas islands of the Philippines

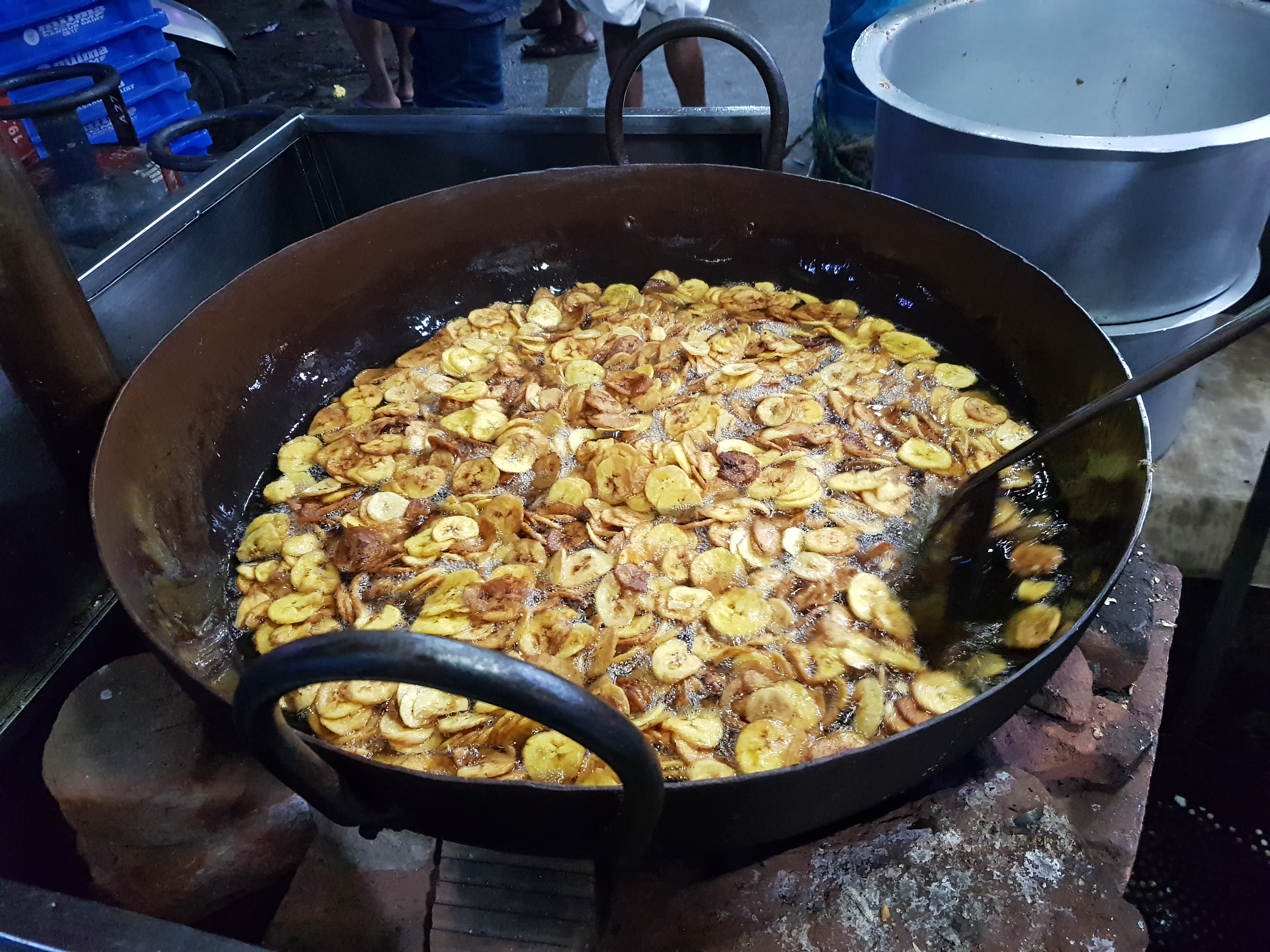
Banana chips getting deep fried at a shop in Palakkad, Kerala, India.

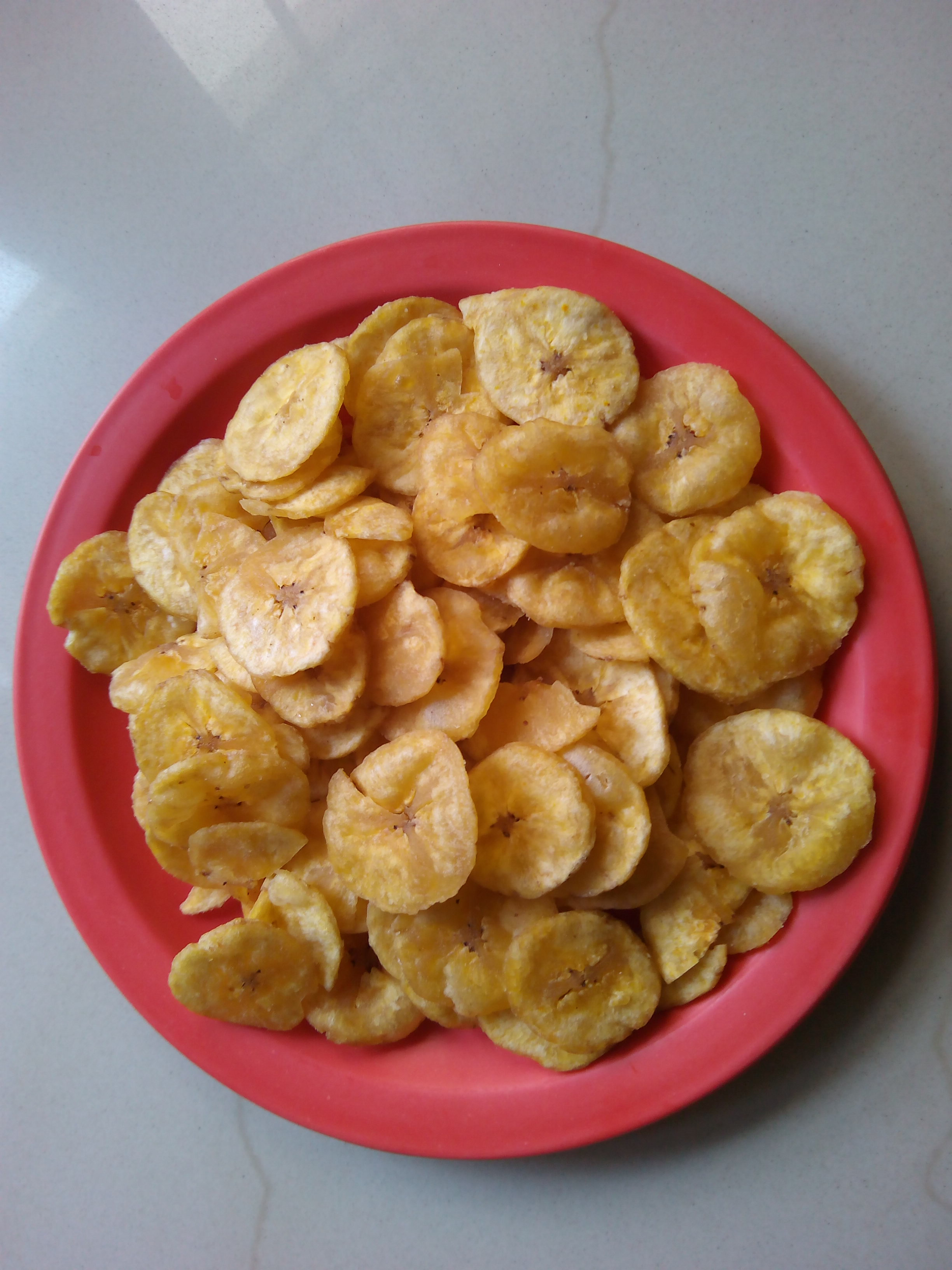
Ripe banana chips from India.

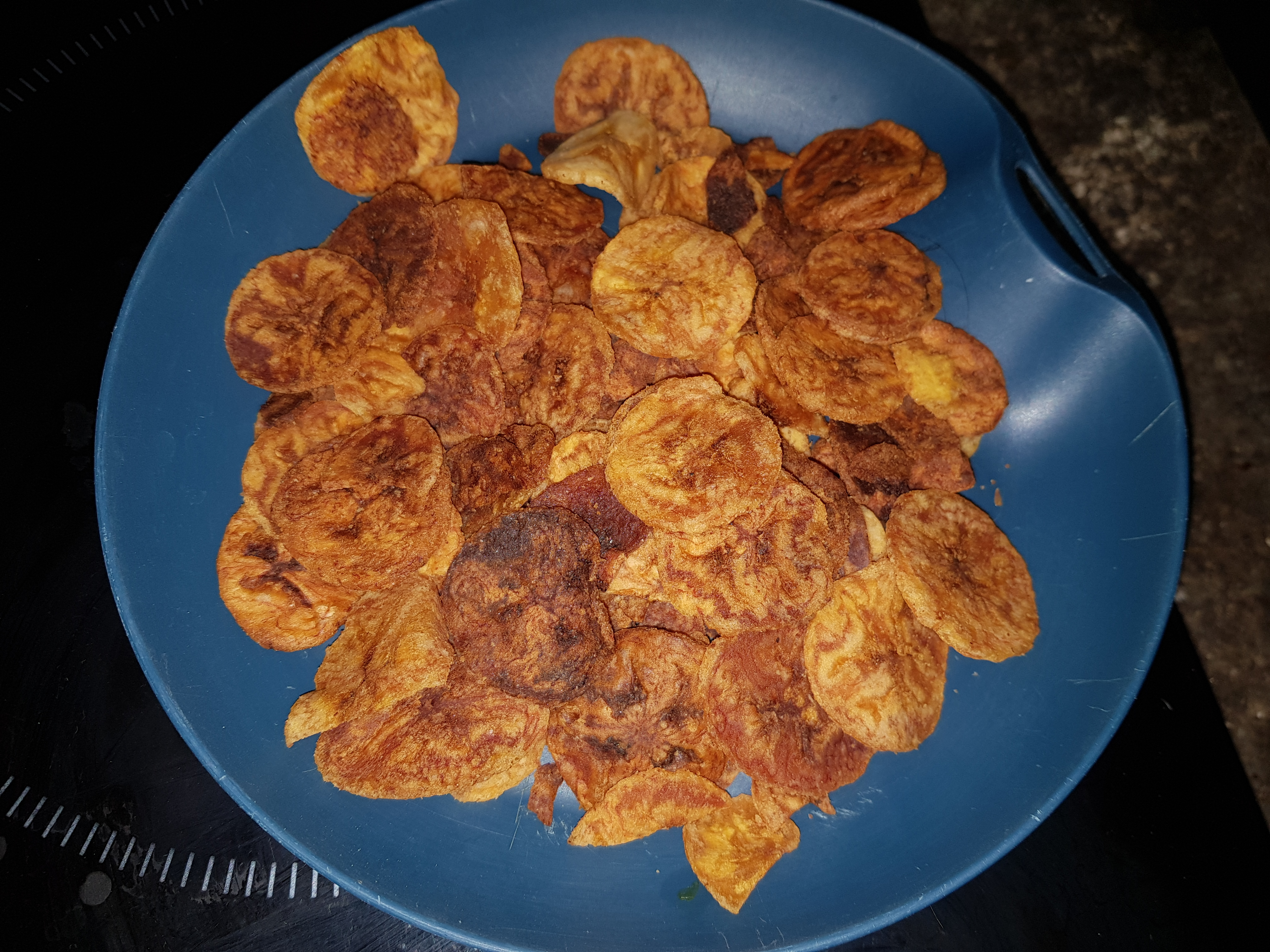
Banana Chips made of ripe bananas from Kerala, India.

== See also ==
- Apple chip
- Banana - In popular culture and commerce, "banana" usually refers to soft, sweet "dessert" Musa cultivars.
- Banana powder
- Chifle - a similar salty snack chip made from plantains.
- Plantain - Musa cultivars with firmer, starchier fruit
- Sun-dried banana
- Tostones - a similar salty snack made from plantains.
- Kripik - Indonesian chips, kripik pisang is Indonesian banana chips
- List of deep fried foods
- List of dried foods
