= Binder (material) =

Material that holds other materials together

A binder or binding agent is any material or substance that holds or draws other materials together to form a cohesive whole mechanically, chemically, by adhesion or cohesion.

More narrowly, binders are liquid or dough-like substances that harden by a chemical or physical process and bind fibres, filler powder and other particles added into it. Examples include glue, adhesive and thickening.

Examples of mechanical binders are bond stones in masonry and tie beams in timber framing.

== Classification ==
Binders are loosely classified as organic (bitums, animal and plant glues, polymers) and inorganic (lime, cement, gypsum, liquid glass, etc.). These can be either metallic or ceramic as well as polymeric depending on the nature of the main material. For example, in the compound WC-Co (Tungsten Carbide used in cutting tools) Co constitutes the binding agent for the WC particles.

Based on their chemical resistance, binders are classified by the field of use: non-hydraulic (gypsum, air-cements, magnesia, hydrated lime), hydraulic (Roman cement, portland cement, hydraulic lime), acid-resistant (silicon fluoride cement, quartz cement), and autoclavable (harden at 170 to 300°С i.e. 8-16 atm pressure and, e.g., comprise CaSiO_{3} materials).

== Physical properties ==
Some materials labeled as binders such as cement have a high compressive strength but low tensile strength and need to be reinforced with fibrous material or rebar if tension and shear forces will be applied.

Other binding agents such as resins may be tough and possibly elastic but can neither bear compressive nor tensile force. Tensile strength is greatly improved in composite materials consisting of resin as the matrix and fiber as reinforcement. Compressive strength can be improved by adding filling material.

== Uses ==
Binders hold together pigments and sometimes filling material to form paints, pastels, and other materials used for artistic and utilitarian painting. Materials include wax, linseed oil, natural gums such as gum arabic or gum tragacanth, methyl cellulose, or proteins such as egg white or casein. Glue is traditionally made by the boiling of hoofs, bones, or skin of animals and then mixing the hard gelatinous residue with water. Natural gum-based binders are made from substances extracted from plants. Larger amounts of dry substance are added to liquid binders in order to cast or model sculptures and reliefs.

In cooking, various edible thickening agents are used as binders. Some of them, e.g. tapioca flour, lactose, sucrose, microcrystalline cellulose, polyvinylpyrrolidone and various starches are also used in pharmacology in making tablets. Tablet binders include lactose powder, sucrose powder, tapioca starch (cassava flour) and microcrystalline cellulose.

In building construction, concrete uses cement as a binder. Asphalt pavement uses bitumen binder. Traditionally straw and natural fibres are used to strengthen clay in wattle-and-daub construction and in the building material cob which would otherwise become brittle after drying. Sand is added to improve compressive strength, hardness and reduce shrinkage. The binding property of clay is also used widely to prepare shaped articles (e.g. pots and vases) or to bind solid pieces (e.g. bricks).

In composite materials, epoxy, polyester or phenolic resins are common. In reinforced carbon–carbon, plastic or pitch resin is used as a source of carbon released through pyrolysis. Transite, hypertufa, papercrete and petecrete used cement as a binder.

In explosives, wax or polymers like polyisobutylene or styrene-butadiene rubber are often used as binders for plastic explosives. For polymer-bonded explosives, various synthetic polymers are used.

In rocket fuels, polybutadiene acrylonitrile copolymer was used in 1960-70's big solid-fuel booster rocket fuels.

Organic binders, designed to disintegrate by heat during baking, are used in sintering.

== History ==
In the Classical World painters used materials like egg, wax, honey, lime, casein, linseed oil or bitumen as binders to mix with pigment in order to hold the pigment particles together in the formation of paint. Egg-based tempera was especially popular in Europe from the Middle Ages until the early 16th century. However, since that time, the binder of choice for paint has been oil.

== See also ==
- Binder (disambiguation)
- Non-bituminous binders
