= Basturs Lakes =

Lakes in Catalonia, Spain

Coordinates: 42.143829°N 1.018279°E

The Basturs Lakes are two lakes located n the northern foothills of “Mont de Conques” and close to the villages of Basturs and Sant Romà d'Abella, belonging to the municipality of Isona and Conca Dellà, in Pallars Jussà, Lleida, Catalonia, Spain.

== Introduction ==
The Basturs Lakes are catalogued as an Area of Natural Interest (PEIN) and are a prominent wetland area of karstic origin, along with the Lakes of Banyoles and the Estany de Montcortès.

The Basturs Lakes complex covers an area of nearly 37 ha. It currently has two well-constituted circular lakes with conical basins, a large one surrounded by deciduous forest (Estany Gros), and a smaller one (Estany Xic), located northwest of the first and surrounded by crops. Both lakes are partly dried up due to the opening of drainage ditches.

The lakes are fed by a source of groundwater, constant throughout the year. The vegetation that forms around the lakes, especially the “Estany Gros” is made up of reeds and rushes, and there is also a rich presence of aquatic plants, some of which are unique in Catalonia, like two species of algae. The poplars, or clops, complete the vegetation of the place, and give rise to an important presence of fauna, from dragonflies to frogs, and some varieties of birds and bats.

A walking area around the two lakes, including a bird watching point, allows for a pleasant visit of the Lakes.

== Geology ==
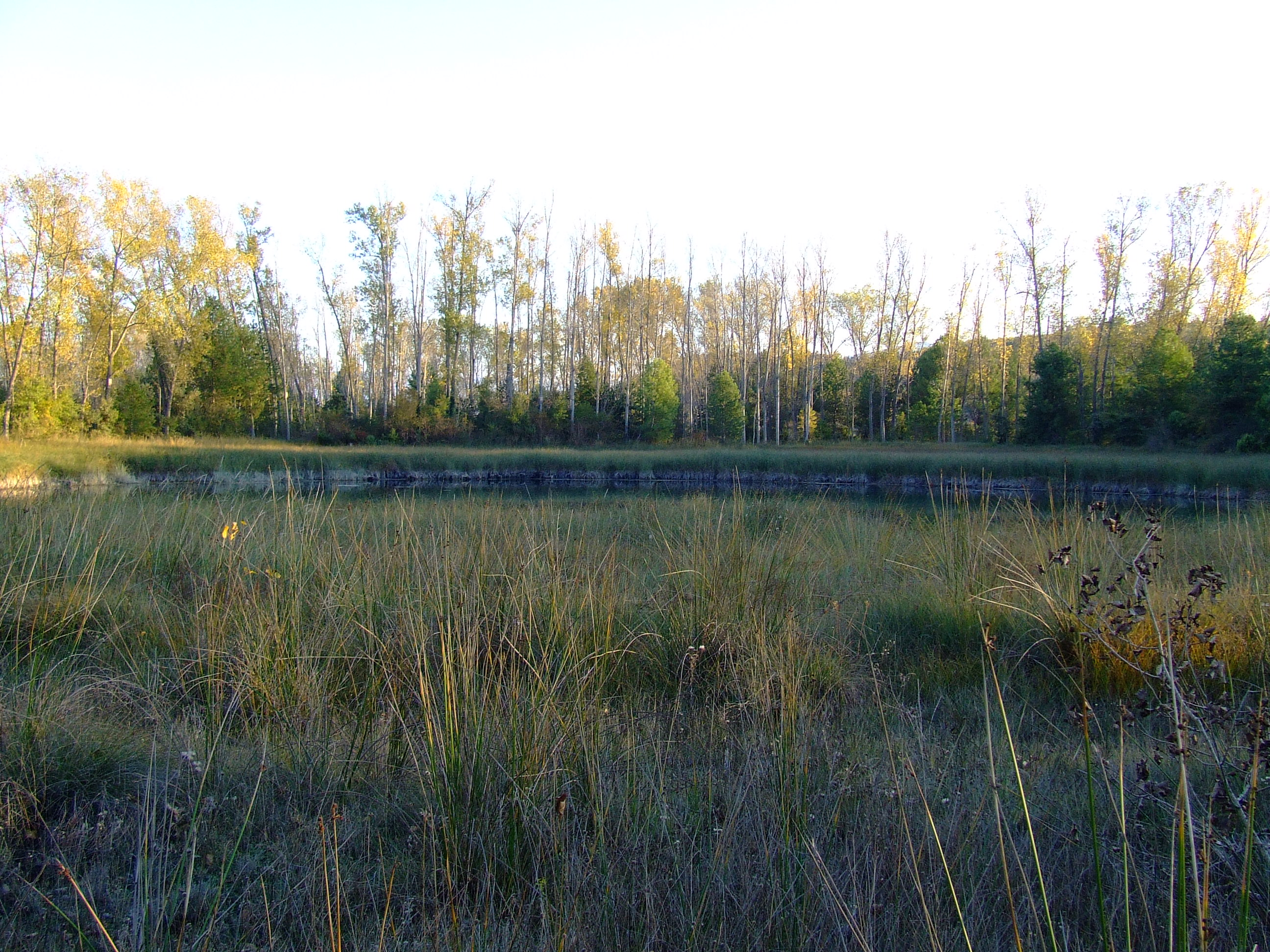
View of the Basturs Lake

The Basturs Lakes are part of the Isona Tufa Mound Complex developed within the Tremp Basin, an artesian structural basin that forms part of the south-central Pyrenean piggy-back thrust located in the Spanish Pyrenees. The Isona Tufa Mound Complex, located in the discharge zone of the confined artesian aquifer, is a unique geological formation in Europe including eleven subcircular depressions associated with tufa mounds and related to former groundwater outlets. These peculiar crater-like features consist of a central depression filled with lake deposits and enclosed by an annular more resistant tufaceous rimstone. The tufa complex developed in association with non-thermal artesian springs of calcium-bicarbonate-rich waters, perched above the local drainages. The elevation of both the base level of erosion and the groundwater outlets has changed throughout the evolution of the system in relation to the episodic entrenchment of the drainage network. Calcium carbonate precipitation around the artesian springs induced by CO_{2} degassing, aided by biogenic activity and local increase in turbulence resulted in the progressive upward growth of tufa mounds topped by annular rimstones enclosing quasi-circular lakes.

The Basturs Lakes, located on the northern foothills of this Mesa, are hydrogeologically related to the fossil lakes located on the raised parts of Mont de Conques. The precipitation of calcium carbonate during the last 100,000 years around the spring associated with the “Estany Gros” has resulted in the development of the tufa mound confining the large Basturs Lake, while the spring that feeds the “Estany Xic” began to emerge about 20,000 years ago. The emergence of the latter triggered a descent of the aquifer water table, causing the deactivation of the fossil lakes located on the “Mont de Conques” Mesa.

The current shape and arrangement of the Basturs Lakes is strongly conditioned by the action of man, the exploitation of the tufa deposits forming the rims of the lakes as a construction material, particularly for building Romanesque chapels and churches during the Middle Ages, followed by the excavation of drainage ditches in both lakes for the use of their water for irrigation of orchards located at lower altitudes, caused the lowering of their original water level.

== Flora ==
The Basturs Lakes feature very fragile habitats of unique characteristics. The physicochemical conditions are the main factors in the distribution of species that inhabit their waters. Note the complexity of the system formed by an almost conical basin with a marked zonification of aquatic biocenosis. Hydrophilic plants such as caraceae and other species found here are highly adapted to live in waters with a high degree of alkalinity. Some elements of these lakes are unique in Catalonia or are only found in some of the other karst lakes (such as the chara aspera and nitella tenuissima, or the Utricularia vulgaris). Some of the species that were identified in the past, like the nitellopsis obscure, have not been found again in recent years, probably due to a serious impoverishment of the biodiversity of area caused by the over-exploitation of the aquifer and the abrupt changes in water level.

Of the less singular helophytic vegetation, it is worth highlighting the dominance of Cladium mariscus, phragmites australis and scirpus holoschoenus. It is worth noting the extraordinary interest of bacterial lymphologic systems associated with the karst nature of the lakes, which have been the subject of specific research, focusing especially on sulfur related bacteria. Also, the presence of ceratium cornutum is noteworthy among the planktonic algal settlements.

The flora in the Basturs Lakes is very interesting, as there are a couple of endemic species, unique in the world. There have been 120 species identified of single-celled algae in the "Estany Gros" and 80 in the "Estany Xic", one of which, (the cornatum ceratium), is unique to the Basturs Lakes. Also, we find a carnivorous water plant, the Utricularia vulgaris. In addition, as in other humid areas, there are reeds and rushes and helophytic vegetation forming limnological systems. Finally, it is worth mentioning the occurrence of very rare species such as claudium mariscus and haplophyllum linifolium.

== Fauna ==
Although only viewed sporadically, the following species have been seen in the Basturs Lakes area: vultures, western capercaillie, grey heron, otters, deer, badgers and beech martens.
