= Sun-dried banana =

Sun-dried bananas are a type of food made by peeling bananas and drying them in sunlight.

They are popular in Thailand, where they are known as kluay-tak in Thai, from klauy-tak-hang for "sun-dried banana". In the Bang Kra Tum district, Phitsanulok province, kluay-tak is a popular dessert made with the local banana variety Mali-Ong, which is sweeter and softer than bananas from other geographic locations. The resulting kluay-tak is fragrant, sweet, and soft textured.

== See also ==
- Banana chip
- List of banana dishes
