= Cardava banana =

Banana cultivar

Musa 'Cardava'
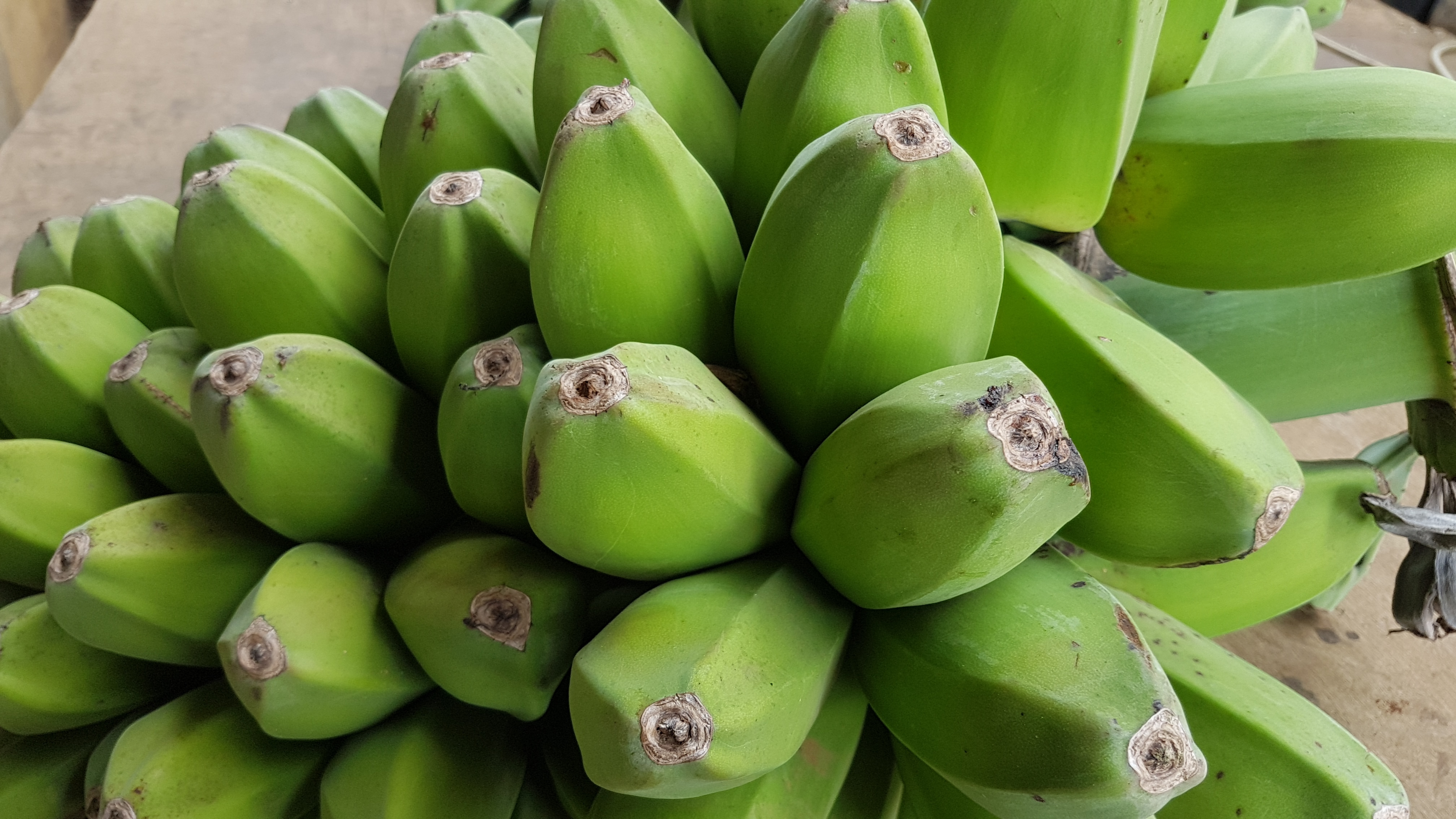
- Cardava bananas from Mindanao
- Hybrid parentage: Musa acuminata × Musa balbisiana
- Cultivar group: ABB group
- Cultivar: 'Cardava'
- Origin: Philippines

Cardava bananas, also spelled cardaba or kardaba, is a triploid hybrid (ABB) banana cultivar originating from the Philippines. It is primarily a cooking banana, though it can also be eaten raw. It is commonly confused with the more ubiquitous and closely related saba banana because they are used identically in traditional Filipino cuisine. Their common names can be interchanged in everyday usage though they are different cultivars.

== Description ==
Like saba bananas, cardava bananas have very large and robust pseudostems, growing up to a height of 4.5 m (15 ft), and a diameter of 68 cm (2.23 ft). It takes around 339 days to flower, and 479 days for the fruits to be ready to harvest. Each bunch contains around 150 fruits in 9 hands. The fruits are distinctively larger than saba bananas and have a rounder more pentagonal cross-section. They are typically harvested while unripe since they are used as cooking bananas, but they can be eaten as is if allowed to ripen.

== Taxonomy and nomenclature ==
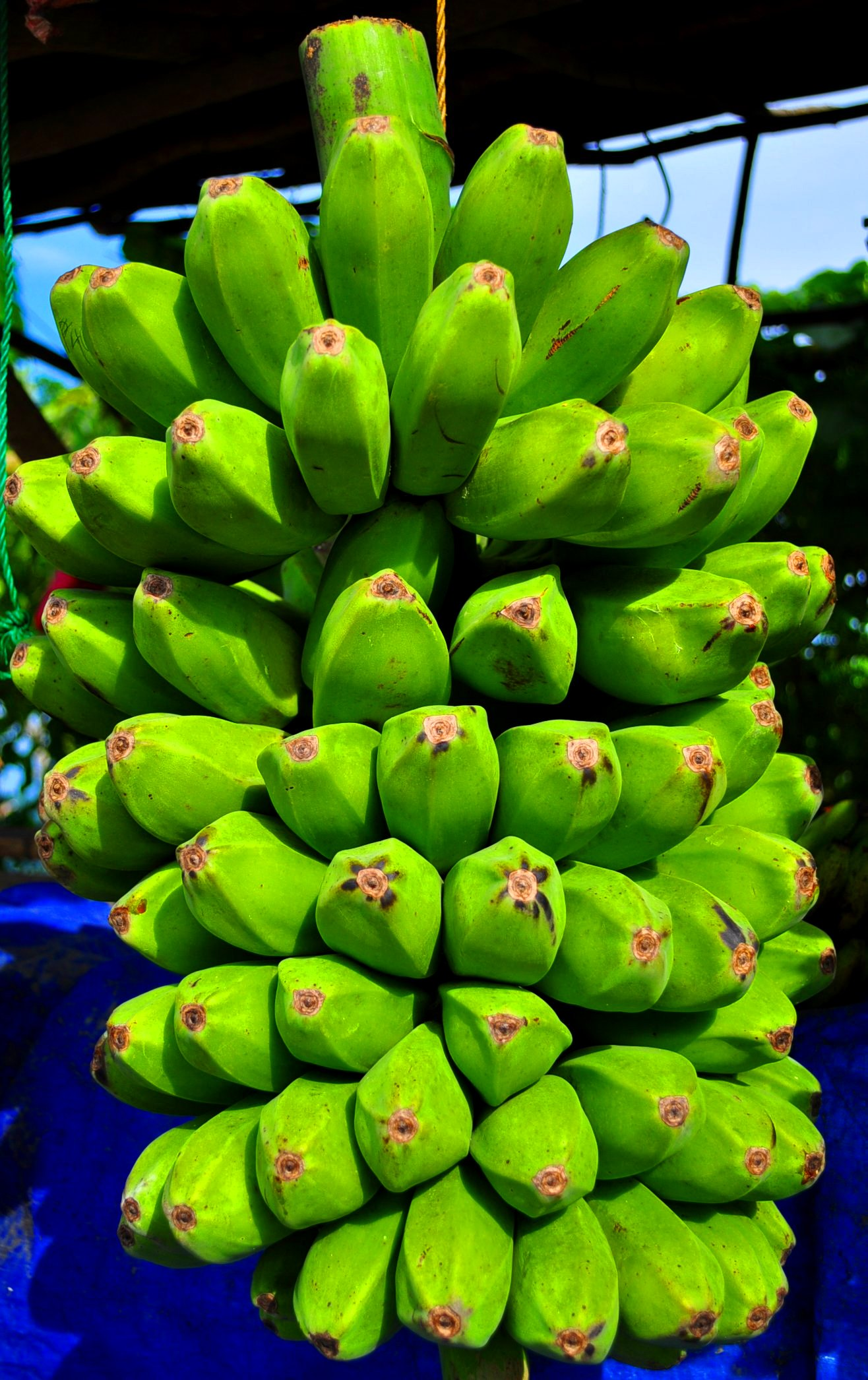
Cardava bananas from Cebu

The cardava banana a triploid (ABB) hybrid of the seeded bananas Musa balbisiana and Musa acuminata. It was formerly believed to be a triploid M. balbisiana cultivar (BBB), which is now known to be incorrect. Its official designation is Musa acuminata × balbisiana (ABB Group) 'Cardava'.

Cardava bananas are also spelled as "cardaba" or "kardaba" in Philippine languages. It is also known as pisang chematu or pisang kepok besar in Indonesia, and chuối mật in Vietnam.

== Uses ==
Cardava bananas are used in the same way as saba bananas in Filipino cuisine. However they are deemed more suitable for processing into banana chips due to their larger fruit sizes.

== Pests and diseases ==
Cardava bananas are highly resistant to black sigatoka (Mycosphaerella fifiensis). However it is vulnerable to the "bugtok" disease which causes the fruit pulp to harden and become inedible.

== See also ==
- Lakatan banana
- Latundan banana
- Banana
- List of banana cultivars
- Plantain
