= Non-bituminous binders =

Binder substance

Non-bituminous binders are alternative binding materials developed to reduce or eliminate the use of petroleum-derived asphalt in construction and infrastructure applications. These materials have gained increasing attention as part of global efforts to improve the environmental sustainability of road pavements, roofing systems, and other civil engineering works.

Conventional asphalt binders are produced from crude oil refining and are associated with greenhouse gas emissions, resource depletion, and economic dependence on petroleum markets. In response, non-bituminous binders have been investigated as potential substitutes that offer comparable mechanical and rheological performance while incorporating bio-based, recycled, or waste-derived components.

Research on non-bituminous binders covers a wide range of formulations, processing methods, and applications, from partial replacement of asphalt to fully asphalt-free systems. Ongoing developments focus on improving durability, temperature susceptibility, and compatibility with existing construction practices.

== Definition and scope ==
The term non-bituminous binders refers to binding materials used in construction that do not rely on petroleum asphalt as their primary component. These binders may be entirely free of asphalt or may use alternative organic or inorganic matrices to achieve cohesive and adhesive functions traditionally associated with bituminous materials.

Non-bituminous binders can be formulated from a variety of sources, including bio-based materials, recycled polymers, industrial by-products, and hybrid systems combining multiple constituents. Their formulation is typically designed to meet specific performance requirements such as load-bearing capacity, thermal stability, and resistance to moisture damage.

The scope of non-bituminous binders includes applications in road pavements, roofing membranes, and other infrastructure elements where conventional asphalt has historically been used. This article focuses on their material characteristics, applications, advantages, and limitations, rather than on specific proprietary products or individual developments.

== Types of non-bituminous binders ==
Non-bituminous binders can be classified into several broad categories based on their primary constituents and binding mechanisms. This classification reflects the diversity of materials and approaches used to replace or complement conventional petroleum asphalt.

Bio-based binders are formulated from renewable biological resources such as vegetable oils, natural resins, and biomass-derived compounds. These binders are often investigated for their potential to reduce environmental impact and reliance on fossil resources while maintaining sufficient mechanical performance for infrastructure applications.

Polymer-based binders rely on synthetic or recycled polymers to provide cohesion and adhesion. They may be designed to achieve specific rheological properties, durability, or resistance to environmental degradation, and can include thermoplastic, elastomeric, or reactive polymer systems.

Inorganic binders, such as those based on mineral or alkali-activated materials, represent an alternative approach that does not rely on organic matrices. These systems are more commonly used in structural applications, although their use in pavement-related technologies has also been explored.

Hybrid systems combine bio-based, polymeric, or inorganic components to balance performance, durability, and sustainability. Such formulations aim to take advantage of the complementary properties of different material classes within a single binding system.

== Raw materials ==
Non-bituminous binders can be produced from a wide range of raw materials, selected based on availability, performance requirements, and environmental considerations. These materials may originate from renewable resources, recycled streams, or industrial by-products, depending on the formulation approach.

Bio-based raw materials include vegetable oils, natural resins, and biomass-derived compounds obtained from agriculture or forestry. Such materials are investigated for their potential to reduce dependence on fossil resources and to lower the environmental footprint of construction materials.

Recycled and waste-derived materials, such as polymers recovered from post-consumer products or residues from industrial processes, are also used as constituents in non-bituminous binders. Their incorporation aims to enhance material circularity while maintaining adequate mechanical and durability properties.

Synthetic raw materials, including virgin polymers and chemically engineered compounds, may be employed to tailor specific performance characteristics such as thermal stability, elasticity, or resistance to environmental aging. These materials can be used alone or in combination with bio-based or recycled components.

== Applications ==
=== Road pavements ===
Non-bituminous binders are primarily investigated for use in road pavement applications as alternatives to conventional asphalt binders. Their use includes surface courses, binder courses, and maintenance treatments, where the binder plays a critical role in providing cohesion, adhesion to aggregates, and resistance to traffic and environmental loading.

In pavement applications, non-bituminous binders are designed to perform under a wide range of temperatures and loading conditions. Depending on their formulation, they can be applied in hot, warm, or cold mixing processes and may be compatible with conventional paving equipment and construction practices.

=== Roofing and building materials ===
Beyond road pavements, non-bituminous binders are also used in roofing systems and selected building applications. In these contexts, the binder contributes to waterproofing performance, mechanical stability, and resistance to thermal and environmental aging.

The use of non-bituminous binders in roofing materials is often motivated by the need to reduce dependence on petroleum-derived products and to improve environmental performance. Their formulations can be adapted to meet specific requirements related to flexibility, thermal behavior, and durability under exposure conditions

== Environmental and sustainability aspects ==
The development of non-bituminous binders is closely linked to efforts to improve the environmental sustainability of construction and infrastructure systems. Conventional asphalt binders are derived from petroleum refining, which is associated with greenhouse gas emissions, resource depletion, and environmental impacts throughout their life cycle.

Non-bituminous binders can reduce reliance on fossil resources by incorporating renewable, recycled, or waste-derived materials. This can contribute to improved material circularity and reduced environmental burdens, depending on the specific formulation and production processes involved.

Sustainability considerations for non-bituminous binders include energy consumption during production, emissions, durability, and end-of-life behavior. The environmental performance of these materials depends on their compatibility with existing construction practices and their ability to achieve comparable service life to conventional asphalt systems.

Ongoing research focuses on quantifying the environmental benefits of non-bituminous binders through life cycle assessment methodologies and on optimizing formulations to balance performance, durability, and environmental impact.
