= Banana powder =

Powder made from processed bananas

Banana powder is a powder made from processed bananas. It is used as a component for production of milk shakes and baby foods. It is also used in the manufacture of various types of cakes and biscuits.

== Manufacture ==
Banana powder is formed by using banana pulp, which is mechanically chopped and then processed with hydraulic shear using a colloid mill, turning it into a paste. Sodium metabisulfite is then used to brighten the yellow color of the paste. The paste is then dried by either spray- or drum-drying, although the latter is more common, because none of the paste is lost while drying. Drum-drying also produces about 2% more powder and dries it more thoroughly. Regardless of the drying process, banana powder can generally only stay fresh on the shelf for about a year.

== History ==
The use of banana powder in baby formula has been widespread since the very early 1900s as a method of keeping babies healthy. In 1916 it was also considered to be one of the "important industries of the West Indies" during this period, along with dried banana "figs".

The United Fruit Company began to produce a product named Melzo during the 1930s, in which banana powder was the main ingredient. Because of the useful properties of banana powder, Melzo was marketed as a "health food for children and old folks, as a corrective for certain indigestions, and as a revitalizer for all who are sluggish mentally or physically".

== Usage ==
=== General uses ===
Banana powder has been found to be a "major source of carbohydrate and calories". While it is generally low as a source of protein, the beneficial ingredients of the powder are still "markedly superior to that of other fruits". The powder has also been found to be useful as a general treatment for dyspepsia (indigestion).

=== Scientific uses ===
In 1984, scientists from India were able to extract part of the "antiulcer compounds" found in banana powder, which ended up creating a type of powder that was "300 times more active" in preventing ulcers in the stomach. Banana powder was later found to increase cell growth, which allowed more rapid healing of the area where ulcers had previously occurred.

== See also ==
- Banana chip
- Banana flour
