= North Dock Tufa =

Petrified tufa formation in England

Coordinates: 54°55′07″N 01°22′00″W

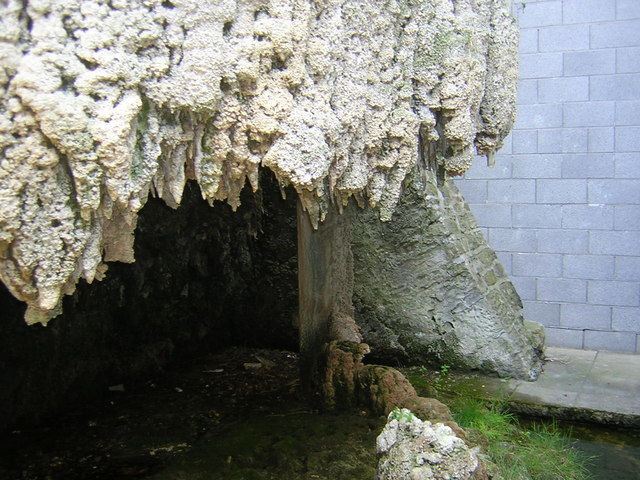
Tufa at Sunderland marina

The North Dock Tufa is a small dome-shaped petrified well, with stalactites and stalagmites, tucked away behind the Marine Activities Centre at Sunderland marina. It is notable for being the best example of its kind in the North of England.

== History of the Tufa ==
The North Dock Tufa was discovered behind some old huts in 1992, when Tyne and Wear Development Corporation began work on developing Sunderland marina. Geologists from Sunderland Museum and Sunderland University were called in to take a look and identified it as a “calcareous tufa dome.”

Tufa is the name given by geologists to deposits of calcium carbonate, a chemical compound which is a common ingredient of seashells, eggshells and rock. The water which flows through the North Dock Tufa is full of dissolved calcite – a mineral which makes up calcium carbonate.

The Tufa built up over several decades as the calcite water covered roots and grasses, forming stalactites and stalagmites. Eventually, everything became petrified. The wall to which the Tufu is attached is part of the original North Dock, which was opened in 1837, so it can only date back to this time.

The water trickling through the Tufa has been traced to just below Harbour View Road, where it can be seen to seep out of the ground. No-one, however, has yet discovered where this water is coming from. Geologists believe it must be filtering through the local Permian Limestone, picking up calcium carbonate along its route. It is possible that this process starts as far away as Fulwell Quarries, which is two miles away.

It is thought that the water could be channelled here through a buried valley, or by the original route of the old railway line, which used to enter the dock at about this point. To preserve the Tufa, the design of the Marine Activities Centre was modified and conservation began at the site in 1993.

The conservation work included removing material from the base of the dome, to make way for a concrete foundation. Bore holes were made through the back of the formation, and steel rods - known as stitch anchors - were placed in the holes, to support the Tufa and stop it coming away from the wall. The Marine Centre was then built around the Tufa.

In 1995 the North Dock Tufa was designated as a Regionally Important Geological Site by Sunderland Council. It was the first such site in Tyne and Wear to receive this status. Today the Tufa, which is still growing and becoming heavier each year, is used by geologists for teaching purposes.
