= Chengalikodan Nendran Banana =

Edible fruit cultivar

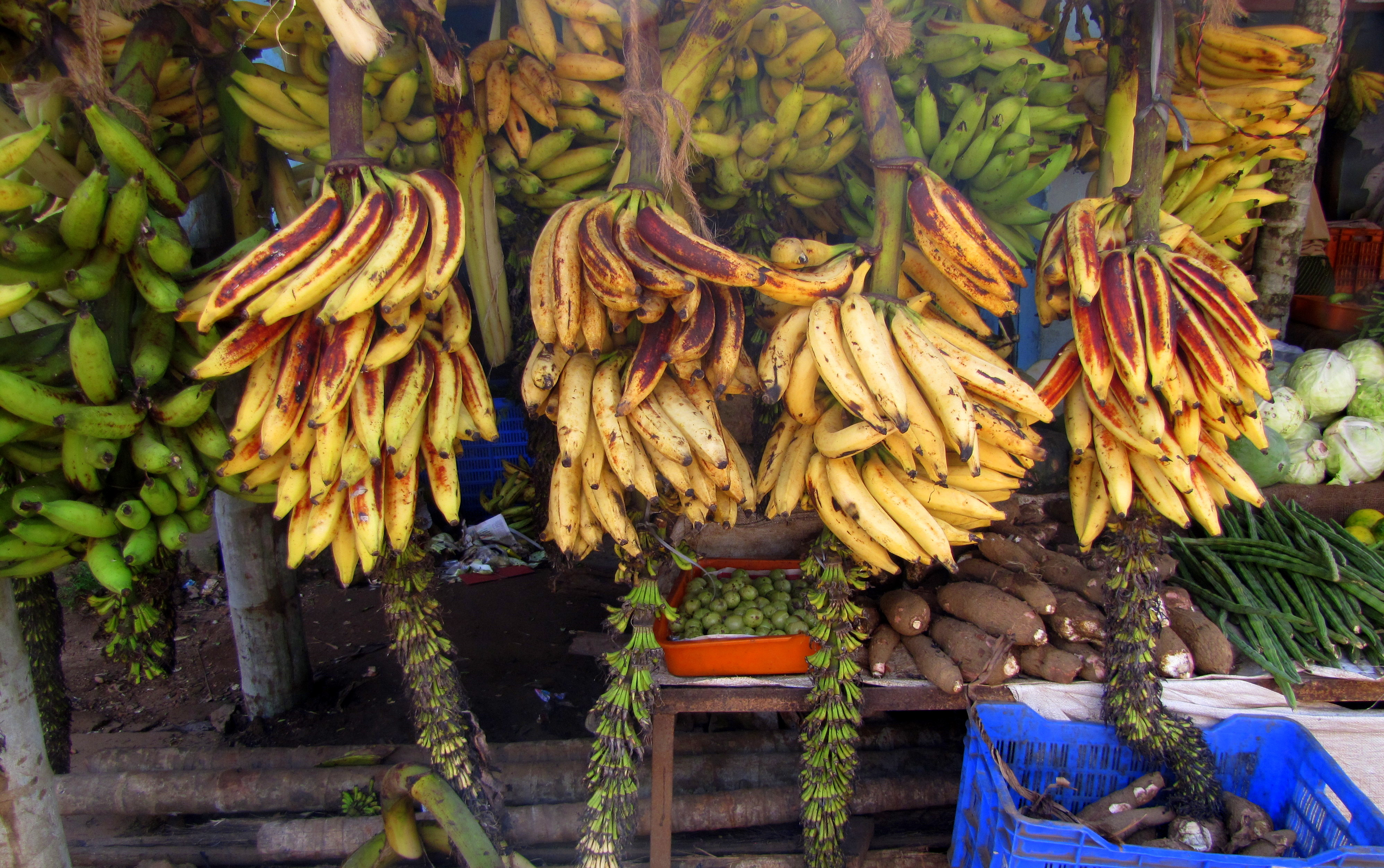
Changalikodan in shops for sale

Changalikodan Nendran Banana, or simply Changalikodan, is a banana variety originating and cultivated in Thrissur District in Kerala, India. Changalikodan, now are cultivated on the banks of the Bharathapuzha river. It is the Kaazhchakula to the presiding deity of the Guruvayur Temple Sree Krishna Temple. The average bunch bears 20 to 25 fruits per hand. Changalikodan received a geographical indication registration from the Geographical Indications Registry, Chennai. The Chengalikodan Banana Growers’ Association, Erumapetty, was given the registration.

== Cultivation ==
The Changalikodan is planted in the month of October and are grown organically which gives its unusual yellow colour and texture. More use of organic fertilizers can affect the appearance of banana bunches. Green leaf manure, ash and cow dung are used to supplement the growth.

== See also ==
- Kamalapur Red Banana
- Nanjanagud banana
- Coorg orange
