= Papercrete =

Cement and paper fiber

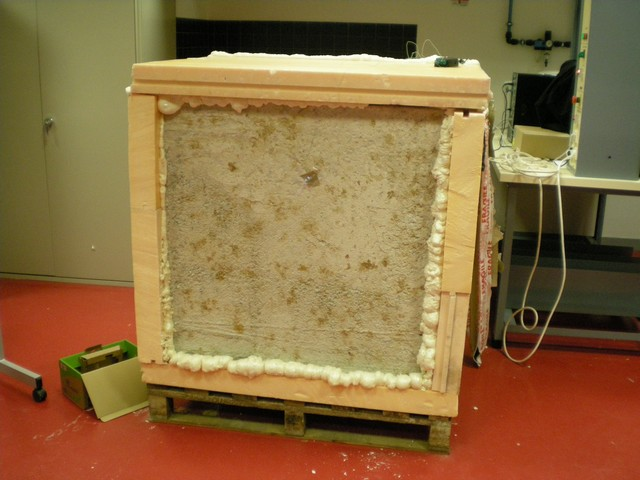
Testing the thermal conductivity of a papercrete panel

Papercrete is a building material that consists of re-pulped paper fiber combined with Portland cement or clay, as well as other soils. First patented in 1928 by Eric Patterson and Mike McCain (who originally named it "padobe" and "fibrous cement"), it was revived during the 1980s. It is generally perceived as an environmentally friendly material due to the significant recycled content, although this is offset by the presence of cement, which emits CO_{2} during manufacture. The material also lacks standardisation, and proper use therefore requires care and experience. However the inventors have both contributed considerably to research into developing the necessary machinery to make it, as well as methods of using it for construction.

== Manufacture ==
The paper used in papercrete can come from a variety of sources, including newspaper, junk mail, magazines, books. A mixer is used to pulp the mix before this is combined with cement or clay. Depending on the type of mixer, the paper may need to be soaked in water beforehand.

== Properties ==
The name papercrete arises from the fact that most formulas use a mixture of water and cement with cellulose fiber. The mixture has the appearance and texture of oatmeal and is poured into forms and dried in the sun, much like the process for making adobe.

Dried papercrete has very low strength, but fails by slow compression (due to the large air content and hence compressibility) rather than in a brittle manner. Concrete and wood (though dry soft wood can be as high as R-2 per inch, high moisture content reduces this value markedly) are not known for their insulating qualities; however, papercrete also provides good insulation.

Papercrete's R-value is reported to be within 2.0 and 3.0 per inch (2.54 cm); papercrete walls are typically 250 to 300 mm (10–12 in) thick. Unlike concrete or adobe, papercrete blocks are lightweight, less than a third of the weight of a comparably-sized adobe brick. Papercrete is generally mold resistant and has utility as a sound-proofing material, however mold can develop if the material remains warm and moist for too long.

Dried, ready-to-use papercrete has a rough surface. This increases its surface area and provides a very strong bond from one block to the next. Additionally papercrete's ready moldability provides considerable flexibility in the designed shape of structures, for example domed ceilings/roofs can be easily constructed using this material. When properly mixed and dried, the papercrete wall can be left exposed to the elements. In its natural state, it is a grey, fibrous-looking wall. For a more conventional look, stucco can be applied directly to it.

Papercrete construction has the advantage of being relatively low-cost, as materials are cheap and widely available. Furthermore, machinery suitable for small-scale construction is simple to design and construct.

== Standardization and commercial acceptance ==
As of 2007, papercrete lacks approval from the International Code Council. This limits its use within cities in the United States where building codes apply, for example in this area it cannot be used as a load-bearing wall. However, its strength in model structures has been proven, meaning that some homes and small commercial buildings have been constructed using it. In these small building projects, papercrete is being used as an in-fill wall in conjunction with structural steel beams or other load-bearing elements. However, there is little or no evidence of its long-term durability.

Research tests into papercrete were carried out by Barry Fuller in Arizona and Zach Rabon in Texas. Fuller directs government-funded research on papercrete through the Arizona State University Ira A. Fulton School of Engineering. He is also head of a subcommittee for the American Society for Testing and Materials, and it is his goal to set standards that will lead to acceptance of the product within the architectural community and commercialization of the product, especially for affordable housing.

Structural tests have been completed on several papercrete formulas and Fuller claims the compressive strength of papercrete to be in the 0.97–1.10 MPa (140–160 psi) range, while others like Kelly Hart claim 1.8 MPa (260 psi). For comparison, the compressive strength of concrete ranges from 15 to 70 MPa (2,200–10,200 psi) depending on the application. A more useful measure of papercrete's properties is its stiffness, that is, the extent to which it compresses under load. Its stiffness is many times less than that of concrete, but sufficient for the support of roof loads in some low-height buildings.

Papercrete was also tested for its tensile strength. Fuller noted that a papercrete block was the equivalent of hundred of pages of paper - almost like a catalog. Papercrete has very good shear strength as a block. Lateral load involves sideways force - the wind load on the entire area of an outside wall for example. Because papercrete walls are usually a minimum of 300 mm (12 in) thick, and usually pinned with rebar, they may be strong laterally.

Zach Rabon founded Mason Greenstar in Mason, Texas for the purpose of producing and selling a commercially viable papercrete block. His product, Blox Building System, is the only mass-produced commercial papercrete block in the market. He has built several residential structures with it.

The Mason Greenstar block had its genesis in a journey Rabon's father, Kent Rabon, made to Marathon, Texas. The elder Rabon made the acquaintance of Clyde T. Curry, the proprietor of Eve's Garden Organic Bed & Breakfast and Ecology Resource Center.

Curry was an early proponent of papercrete and benefited from the lack of building regulations in the small mountain community of Marathon. Curry built four of the rooms at the bed and breakfast either partially or entirely out of papercrete and is in the process of building two more, in addition to a library and reception area, entirely out of papercrete. Along with Fuller's work at Arizona State University, Curry's establishment has become a resource center for people interested in papercrete, and workshops are intermittently held there.

The Rabons had prior experience as homebuilders and are owners of a ready-mix cement plant in Mason. They invested in research and testing on their product for several years. However, they consider their product a proprietary formula. They filed for a separate patent even though a patent for papercrete had already been filed in 1928. The block developed by Mason Greenstar is known for its uniform shrinkage (all papercrete blocks go through a lengthy dry-time that involves some shrinkage), giving it a sharper edge.

Fuller has remarked that in tests he has performed on the Rabon block, it has outperformed other formulas.

A study model home made of papercrete has been built at the Lyle Center for Regenerative Studies. This study model is a sample of homes to be built for a sustainable community in Tijuana by students of California State Polytechnic University, Pomona.

== Similar materials ==
Different earth-paper mixes are promoted under different names. A mix that uses clay as a binder instead of Portland cement is often referred to as "Hybrid Adobe", "Fidobe", or "Padobe".

== See also ==
- Asbestos cement
- Papier mache
- Pykrete
- Fiber cement
- Concrete cloth
- Hypertufa
- Hempcrete
