= Hypertufa =

Cement and light aggregate

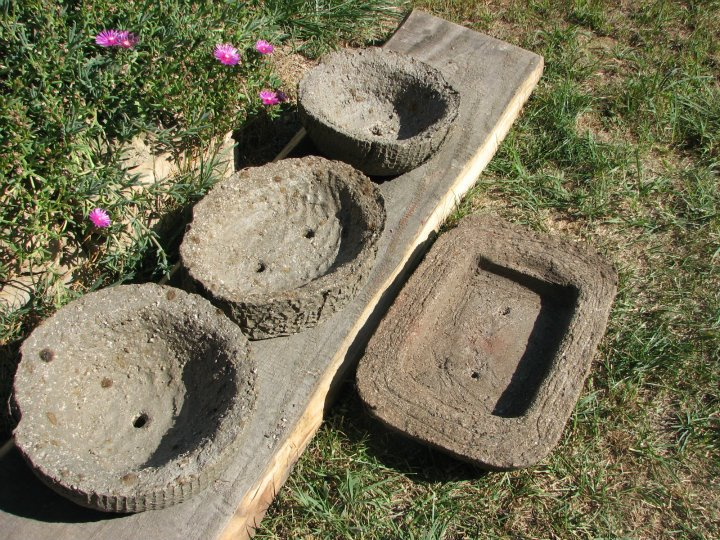
Hypertufa planters

Hypertufa is an anthropic rock made from various aggregates bonded together using Portland cement.

Hypertufa is intended as a manufactured substitute for natural tufa, which is a slowly precipitated limestone rock; being very porous, it is favorable for plant growth.

Hypertufa is popular for making garden ornaments, pots and land forms. It is relatively light compared with terracotta or traditional concrete and can withstand harsh winters, at least down to −30 °C (−22 °F).

Hypertufa was invented for use in alpine gardens. Alpine gardeners formerly used antique animal watering troughs, which became rare and expensive.

== Composition ==
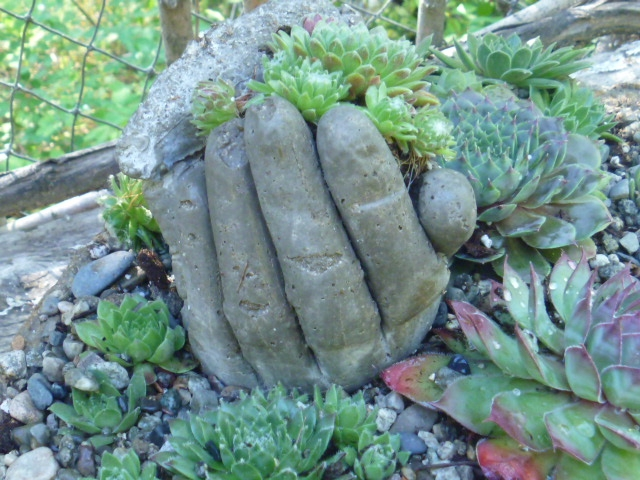
A hand-shaped planter made of hypertufa.

Aggregates are generally Sphagnum (peat moss), sand, and perlite or vermiculite. Coconut coir is another option that can be used in place of peat moss.

To increase structural strength and longevity, polymer fibers, liquid acrylic, and fiberglass may be incorporated into the mixture, along with various grades of sand, pebbles, and crushed rock which add to the final object's overall strength and stone-like appearance though they increase its weight. Powdered concrete dyes (in small amounts) also tint the hypertufa to resemble natural rock.

== Example ==
An example of a hypertufa mortar mix (with classic proportions) is a 1:3 mix of cement-to-aggregate, given by a composition of:

- Three parts type I Portland cement
- Four parts sphagnum or coir
- Five parts perlite

Restated: Three parts cement to nine parts aggregate (by volume, not weight, very rough measure).

== Manufacture ==
After water is added to the mixture, it is packed into a previously constructed mold, then sealed or covered in plastic and allowed to cure. The object may be carefully removed from its wrapping after 2–3 days for trimming and/or distressing, after which it is re-wrapped for another 3–5 days, at which time it is no longer considered "green" and can be handled & worked without danger of breakage. It is then re-wrapped, moistened if necessary & left to cure for a month. The longer the cure, the stronger the hypertufa. After the hypertufa object is completely cured, it is removed from the plastic, rinsed thoroughly, and allowed to sit exposed to the elements for several more weeks to reduce its otherwise-toxic surface alkalinity. It can then be used to hold plants.

== See also ==
- Papercrete
