= Kerala cuisine =

Culinary style that originated in Kerala

Kerala cuisine is a culinary style that originated in Kerala, a state on the southwestern Malabar Coast of India. It includes both vegetarian and non-vegetarian dishes prepared using fish, poultry and red meat, with rice as a typical accompaniment. Chillies, curry leaves, coconut, mustard seeds, turmeric, tamarind, asafoetida and other spices are also used in the preparation.

Kerala is known as the "Land of Spices" because it traded spices with Europe as well as with many ancient civilizations, with the oldest historical records of the Sumerians from 3000 BCE.

== Historical and cultural influences ==
In addition to historical diversity, cultural influences, particularly the large introduction of Muslims and Christians, have added dishes and styles to Kerala cuisine, especially non-vegetarian dishes. Some Hindus in Kerala do not consume beef and pork according to religious dietary restrictions. Most Muslims do not eat pork and other food forbidden by Islamic law. Alcohol is available in Kerala in many hotels, bars and liquor stores.

== Overview ==
A traditional Kerala meal is the vegetarian sadya. A full-course sadya consists of rice with about 20 different accompaniments and desserts, and is the ceremonial meal usually eaten on celebratory occasions in Kerala, including weddings, Onam and Vishu. It is served on a plantain leaf.

Because of its rich trading heritage, over time, various indigenous Kerala dishes have been blended with foreign dishes to adapt them to local tastes. Coconuts grow in abundance in Kerala, so grated coconut and coconut milk are commonly used for thickening and flavouring.

Kerala's long coastline and numerous rivers have led to a strong fishing industry in the region, making seafood a common part of meals. Rice is grown in abundance along with tapioca and is the main starch ingredient used in Kerala's food.

Having been a major production area of spices for thousands of years, Kerala makes frequent use of black pepper, cardamom, clove, ginger, and cinnamon. Kerala also has a variety of breakfast dishes like idli, dosa, appam, idiyappam, puttu, and pathiri.

== Snacks ==
Well-known snacks from Kerala include:

- Banana chip - Thinly sliced raw bananas fried in coconut oil, often flavored with salt or jaggery.
- Achappam - A crispy, flower-shaped, deep-fried snack made from rice flour, coconut milk, and eggs.
- Kuzhalappam - A cylindrical snack made from rice flour, coconut, cumin, and sesame seeds.
- Unni appam - Deep-fried rice cakes made with jaggery, banana, and coconut.
- Ela ada - A steamed snack made with rice flour dough, filled with jaggery and grated coconut, wrapped in banana leaves.
- Pazham pori - Bananas are slit lengthwise after peeling and dipped into a batter made from all-purpose flour, salt, turmeric powder and sugar. This is then deep-fried in oil until golden brown.
- Neyyappam - A sweet rice-based fritter fried in ghee.
- Kozhukkatta - Steamed rice dumplings filled with sweet coconut and jaggery.
- Sukiyan - A deep fried fritter made from mung bean, jaggery and maida.
- Undampori - A deep-fried, round fritter made from wheat flour, mashed bananas, and jaggery.
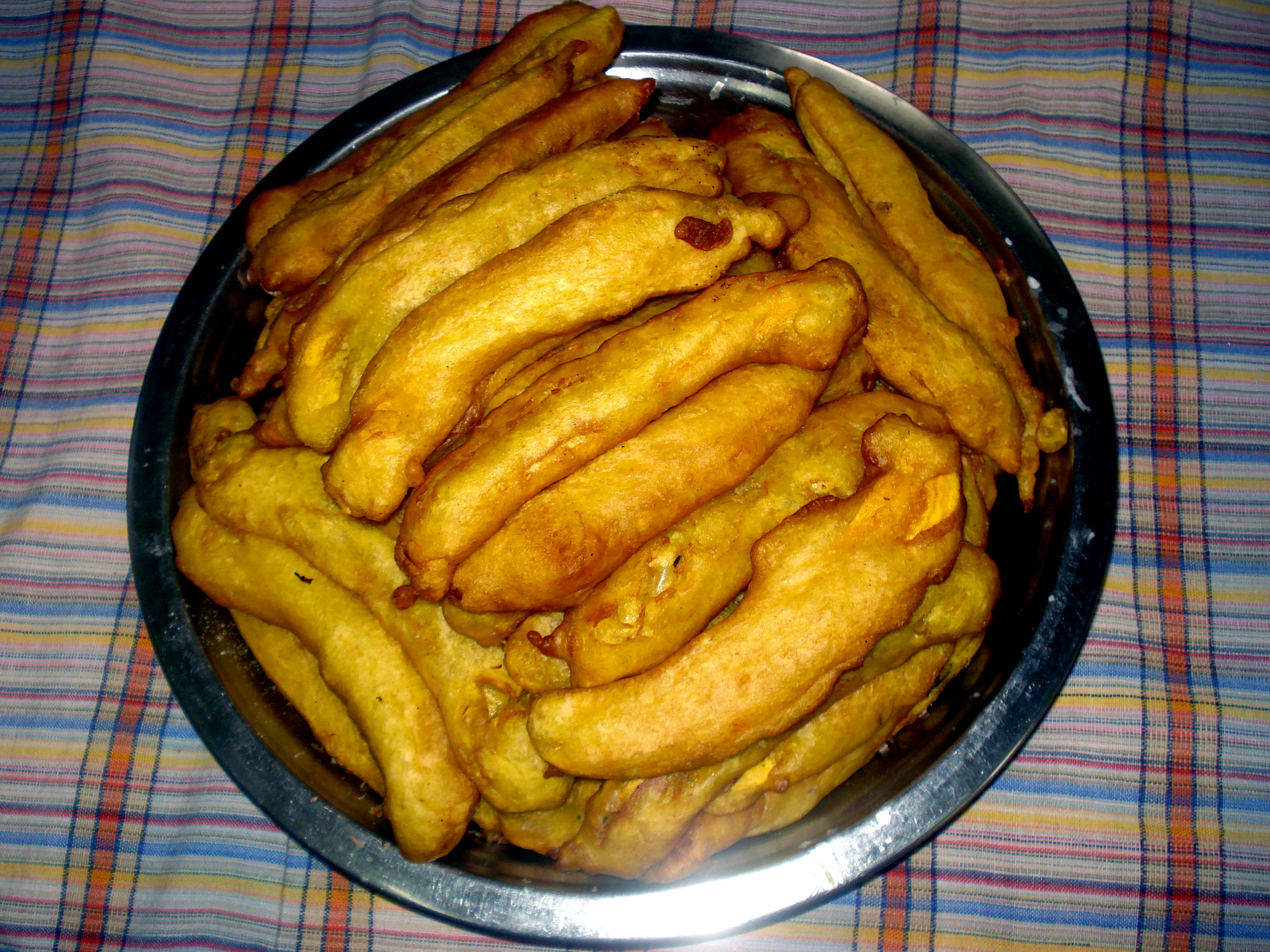
Pazham pori

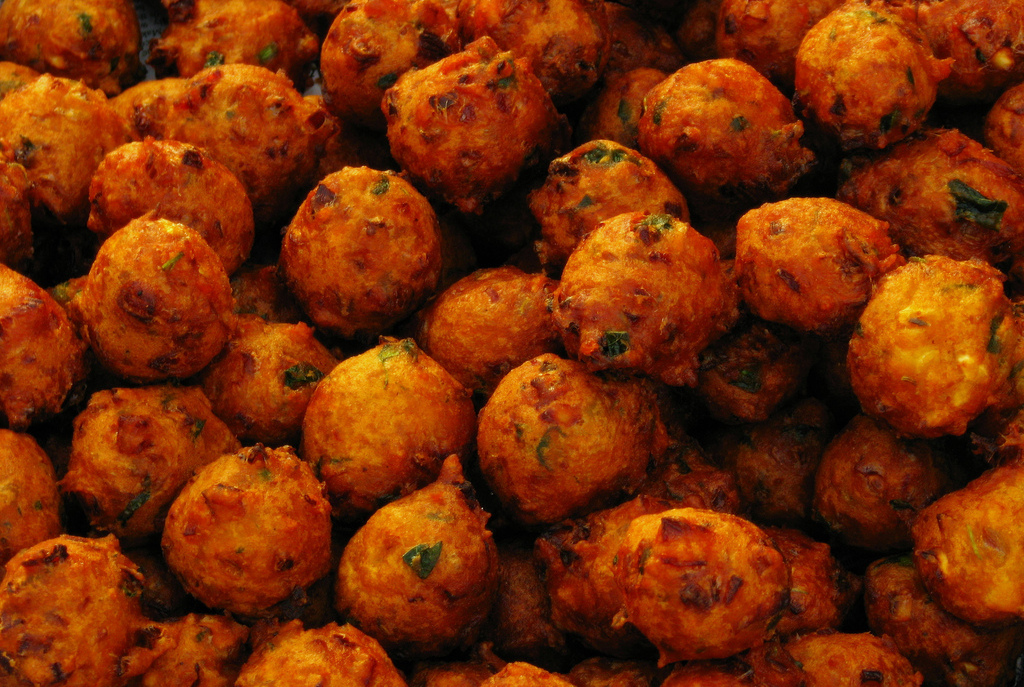
Bonda

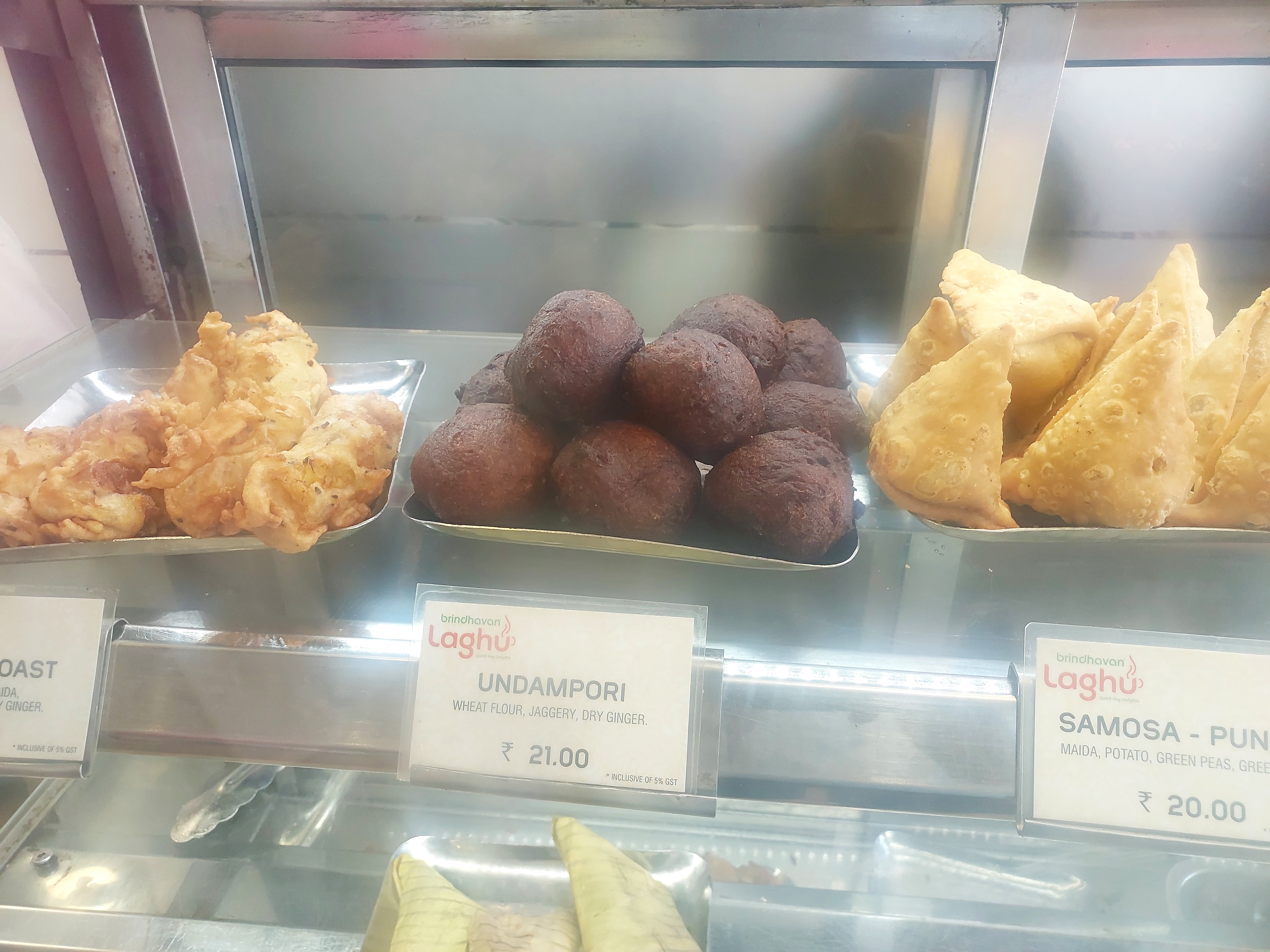
Undampori

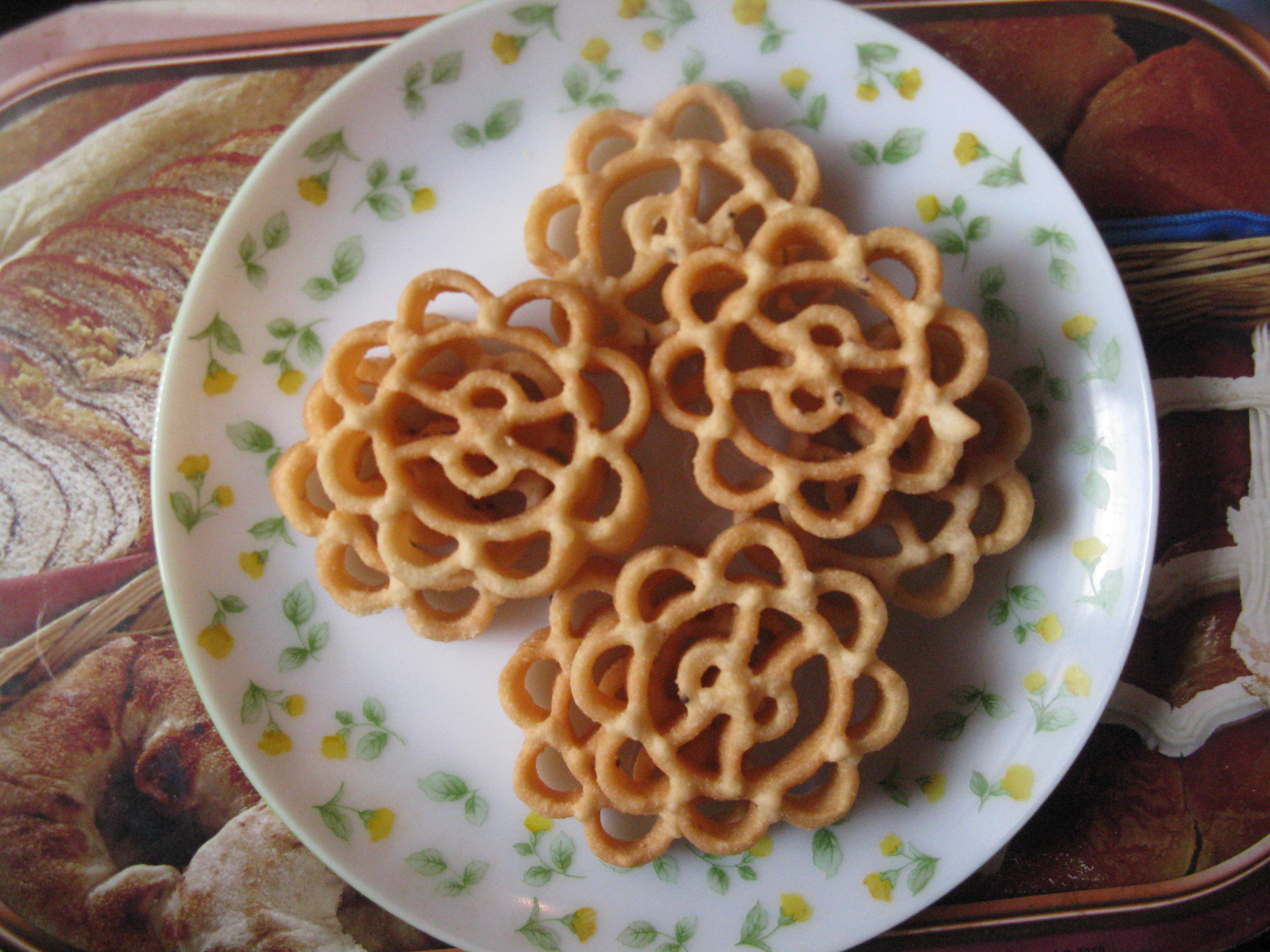
Achappam

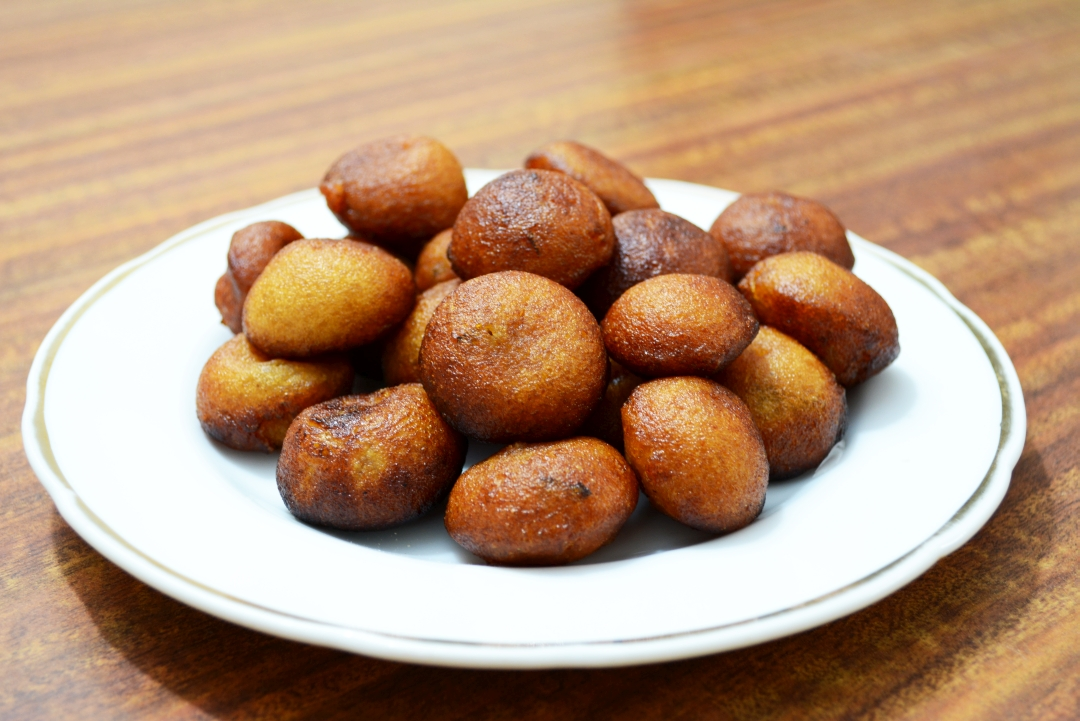
Unni appam

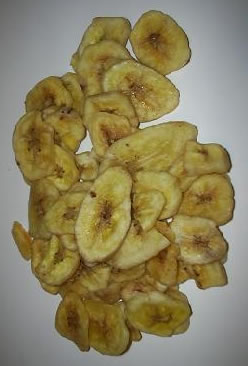
Banana chips

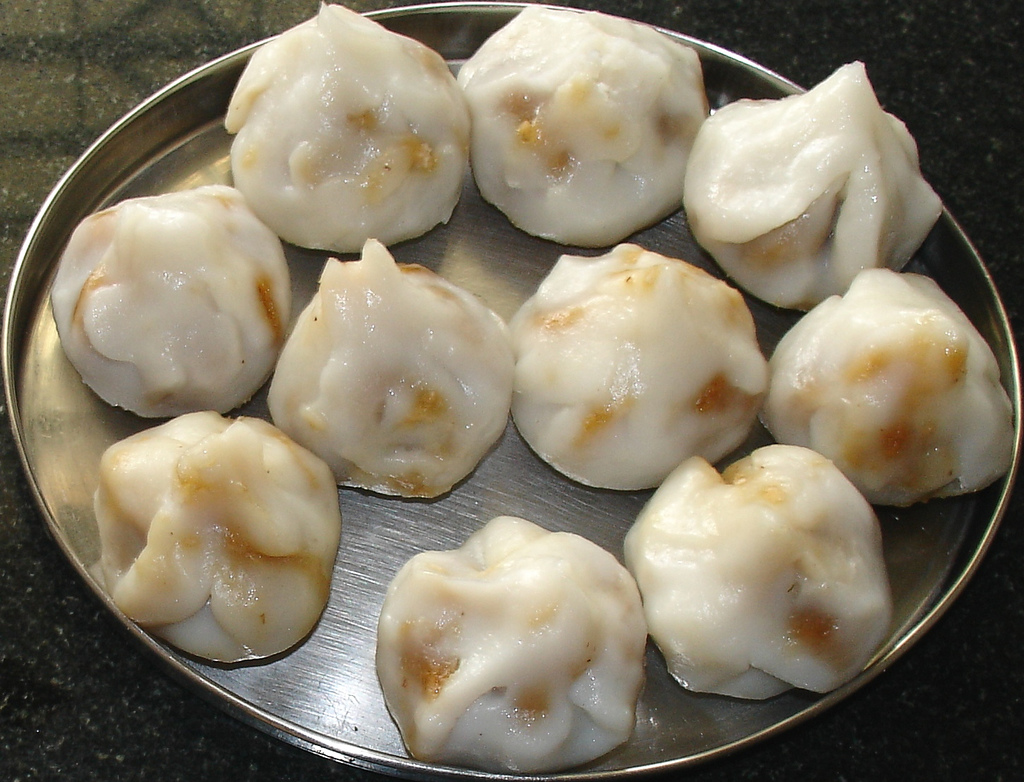
Kozhukkatta

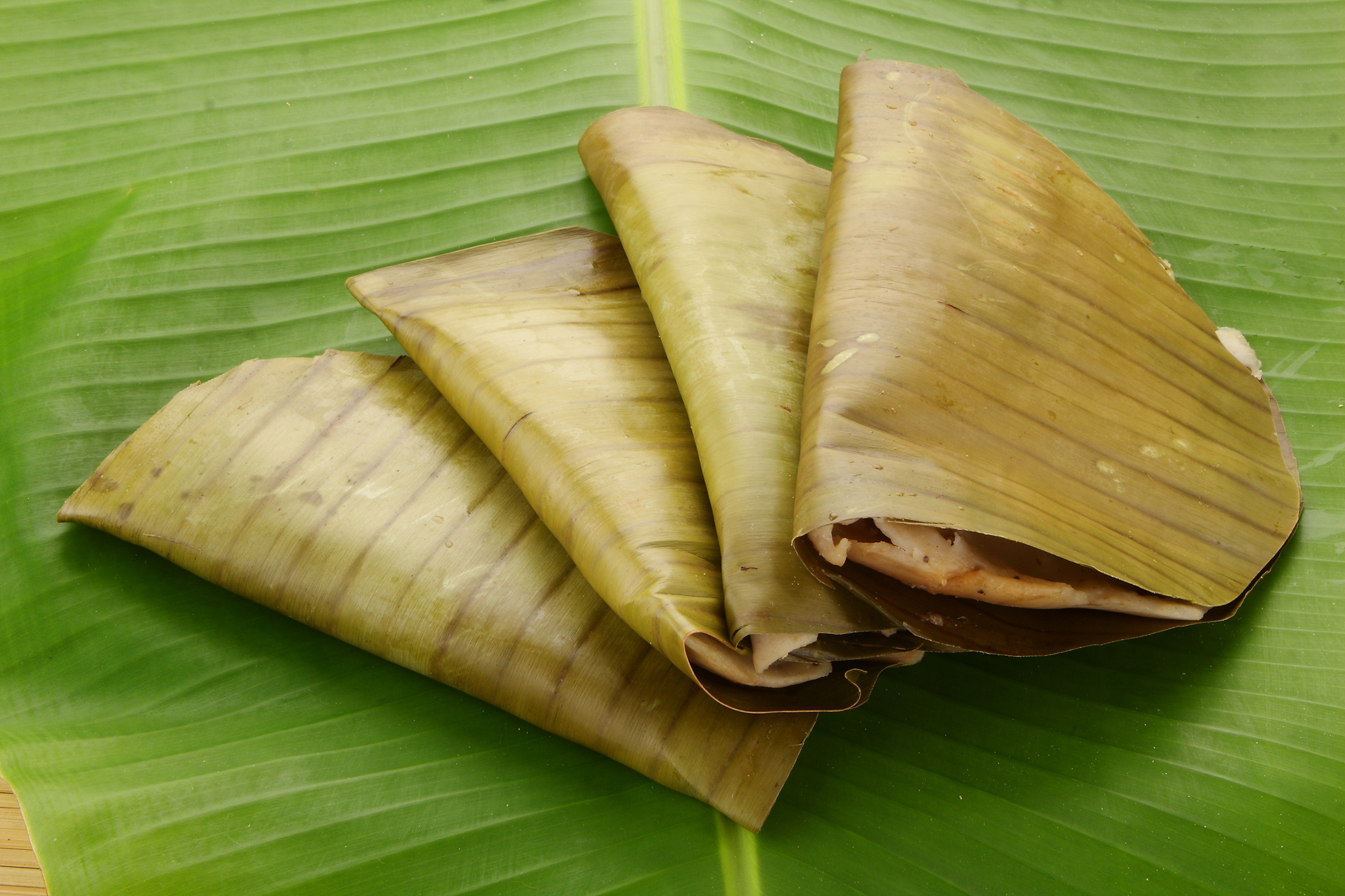
Ela Ada

== Breads ==
Kerala has a variety of traditional breads prepared by baking or frying.

- Appam - A bowl-shaped pancake made with fermented rice batter and coconut milk, typically paired with stew or egg curry
- Parotta - It is a layered flatbread made from refined flour and oil.
- Dosa - It is a thin, savoury crepe in Indian cuisine made from a fermented batter of ground black gram and rice.
- Pathiri - Thin rice flour flatbread popular among the Malabar Muslim community, paired with coconut milk-based curries.
- Puttu - Steamed cylinders of rice cake made of ground rice layered with coconut shavings, sometimes with a sweet or savory filling on the inside.
- Vattayappam - It is made from rice flour, sugar, and coconut. It is an oil-free tea-time snack.
- Kalathappam - A soft, fermented rice pancake made with coconut milk and toddy (or yeast).
- Idiyappam - Thin, steamed rice noodles shaped like nests, served with coconut milk, sugar, or spicy curries.
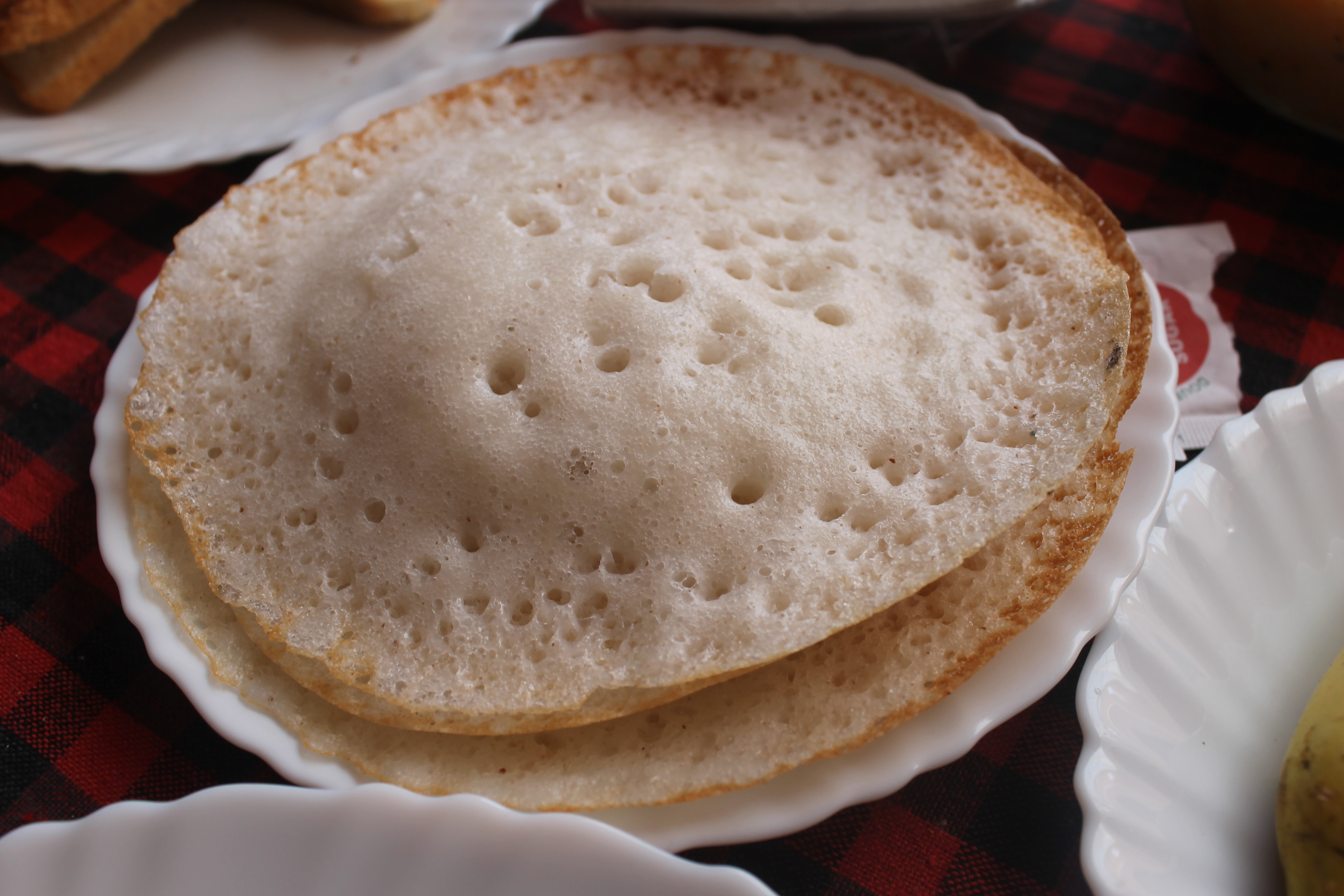
Appam

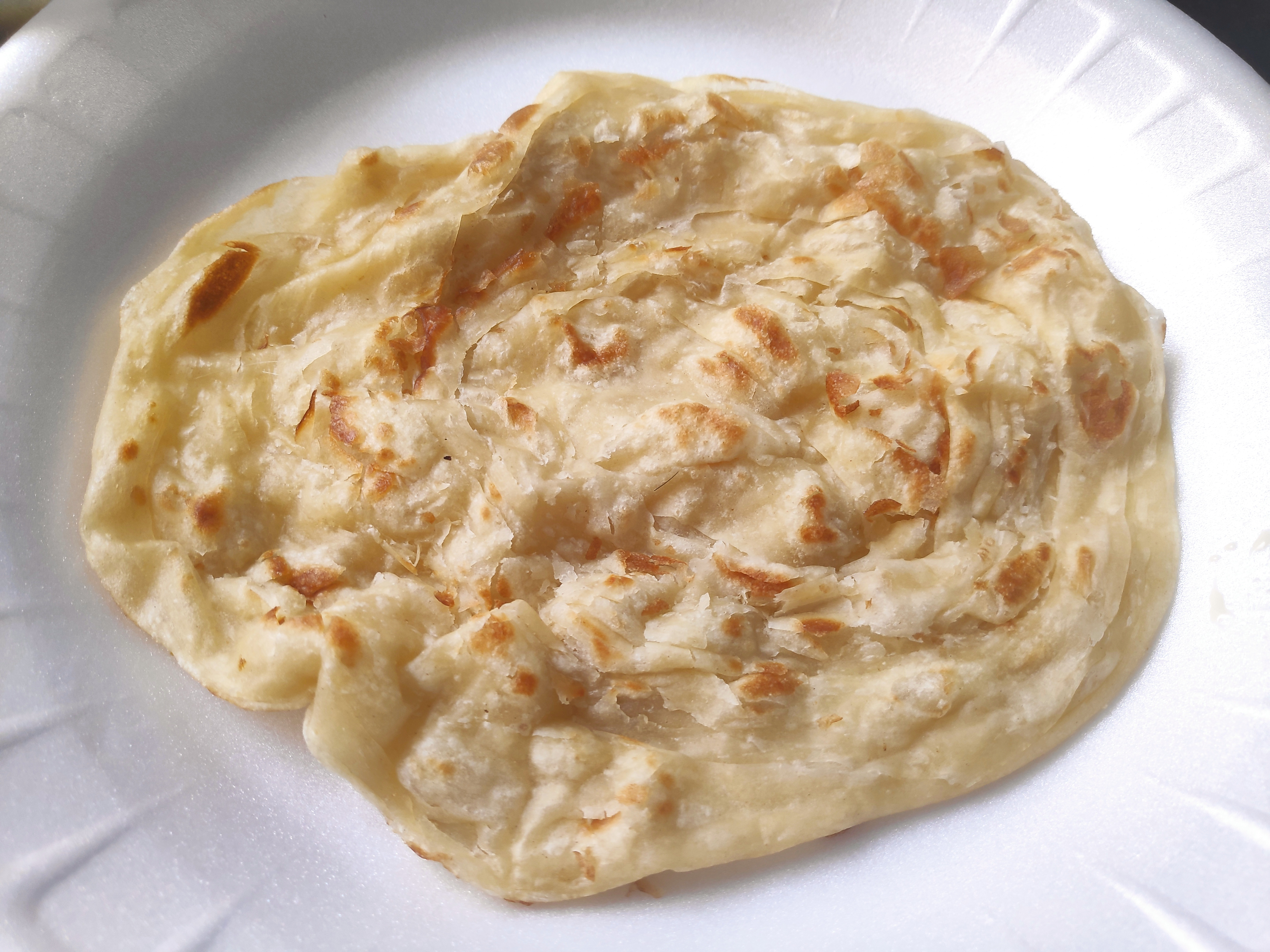
Parotta

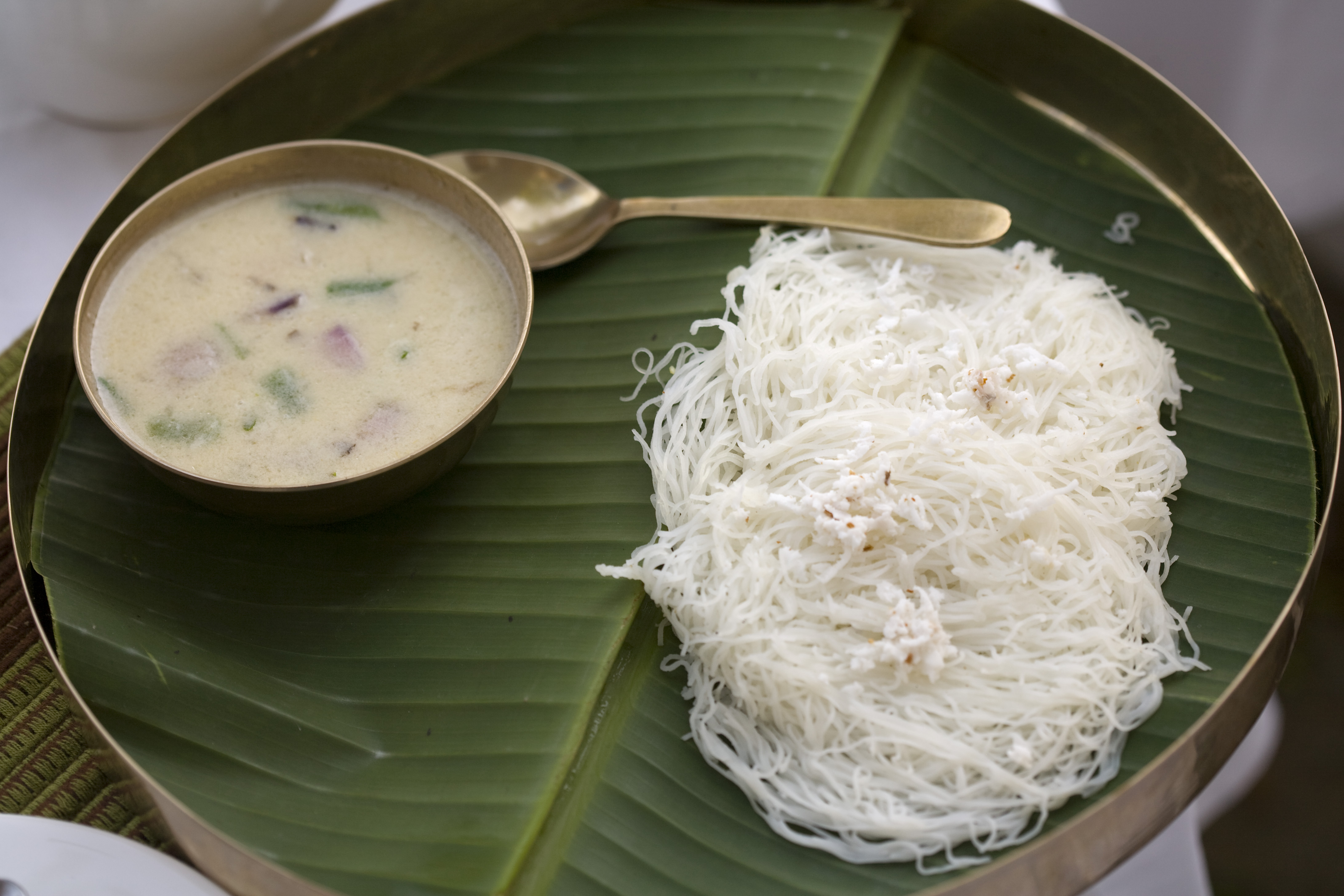
Idiyappam

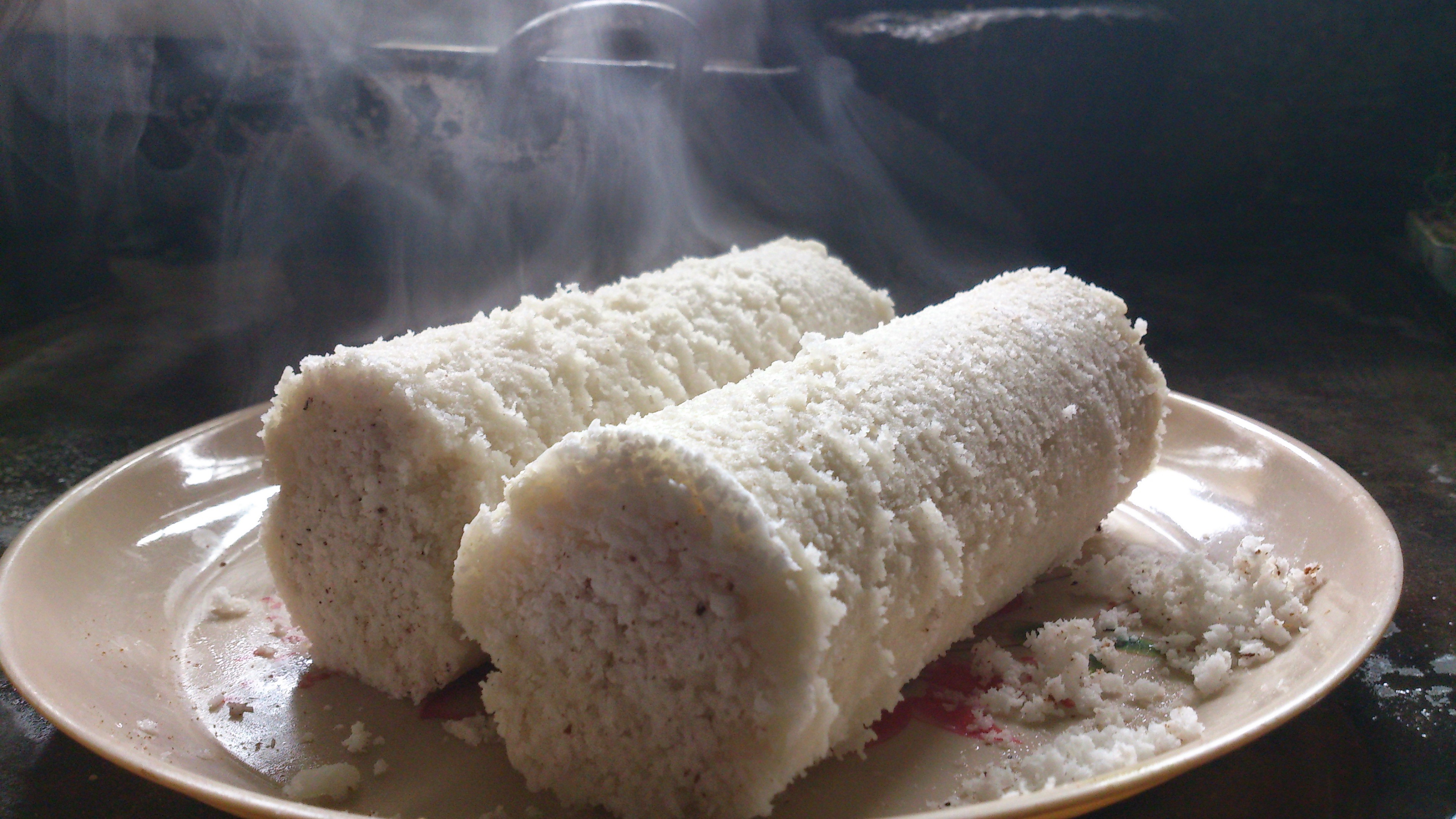
Puttu

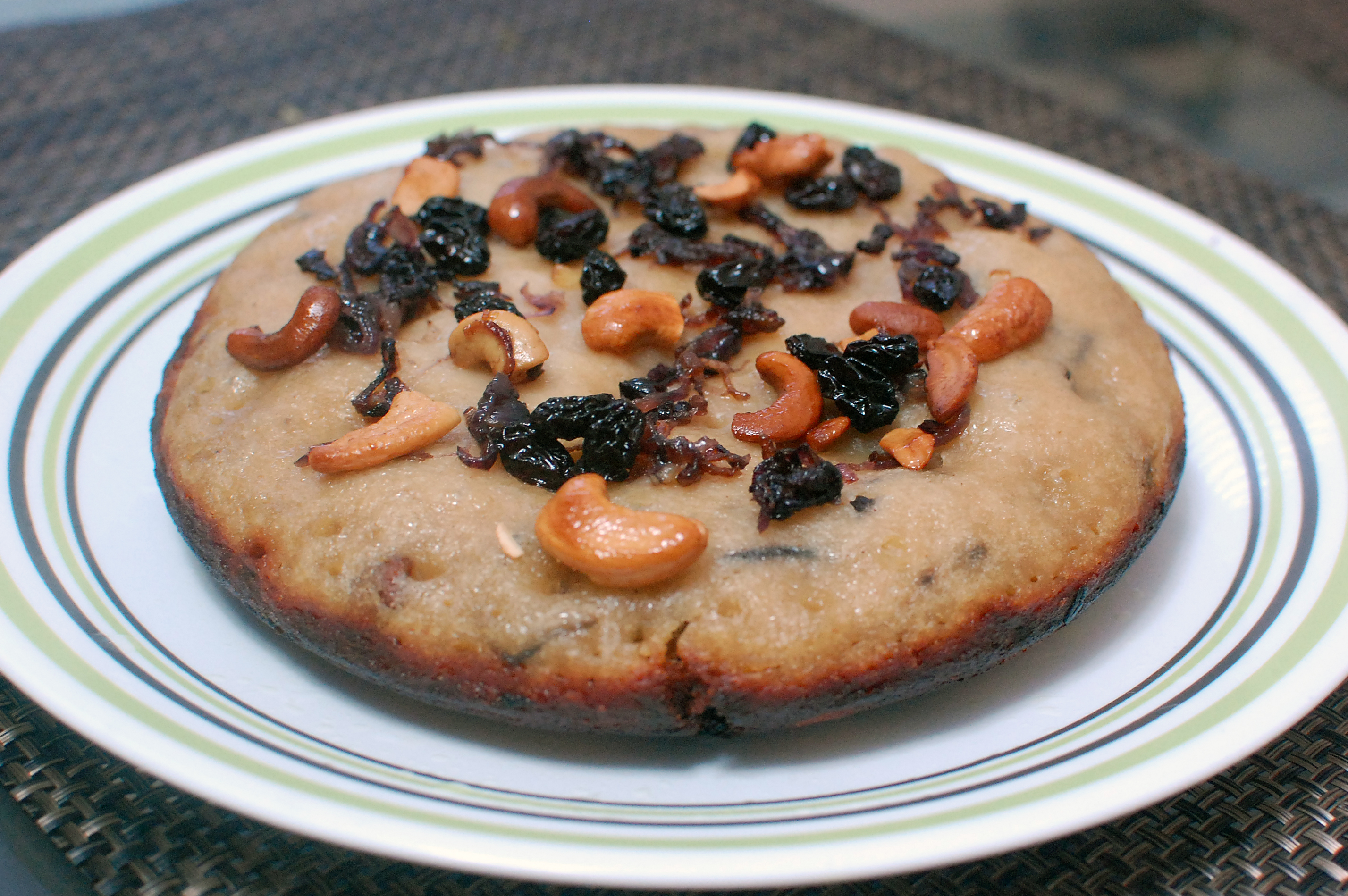
Kalathappam

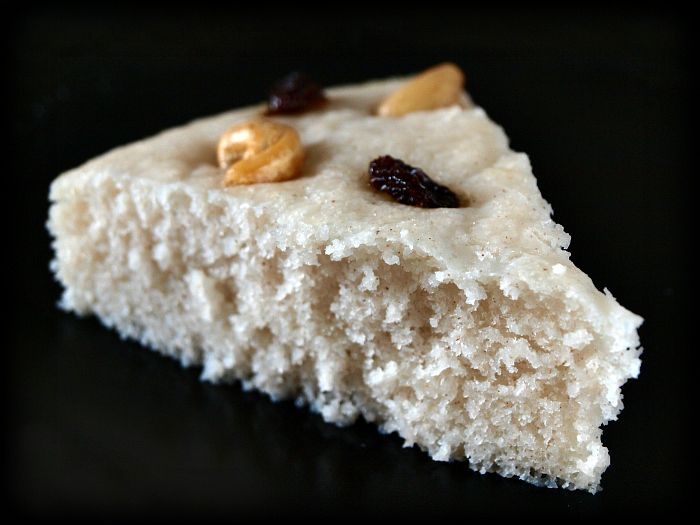
Vattayappam

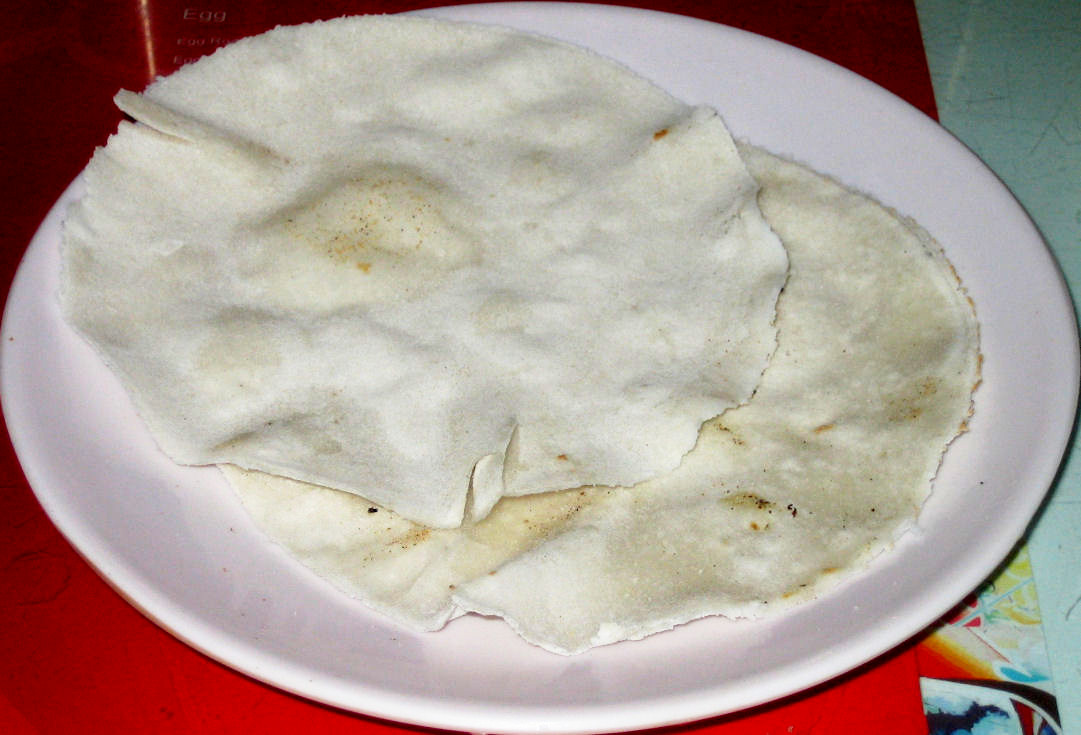
Pathiri

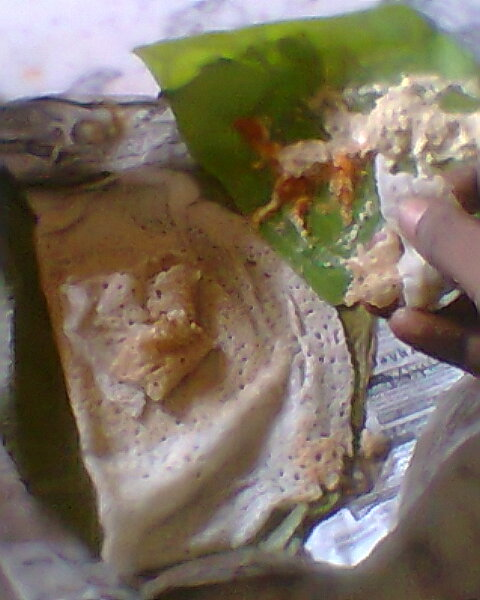
Dosa

== Religion-specific cuisines ==
=== Hindu cuisine ===
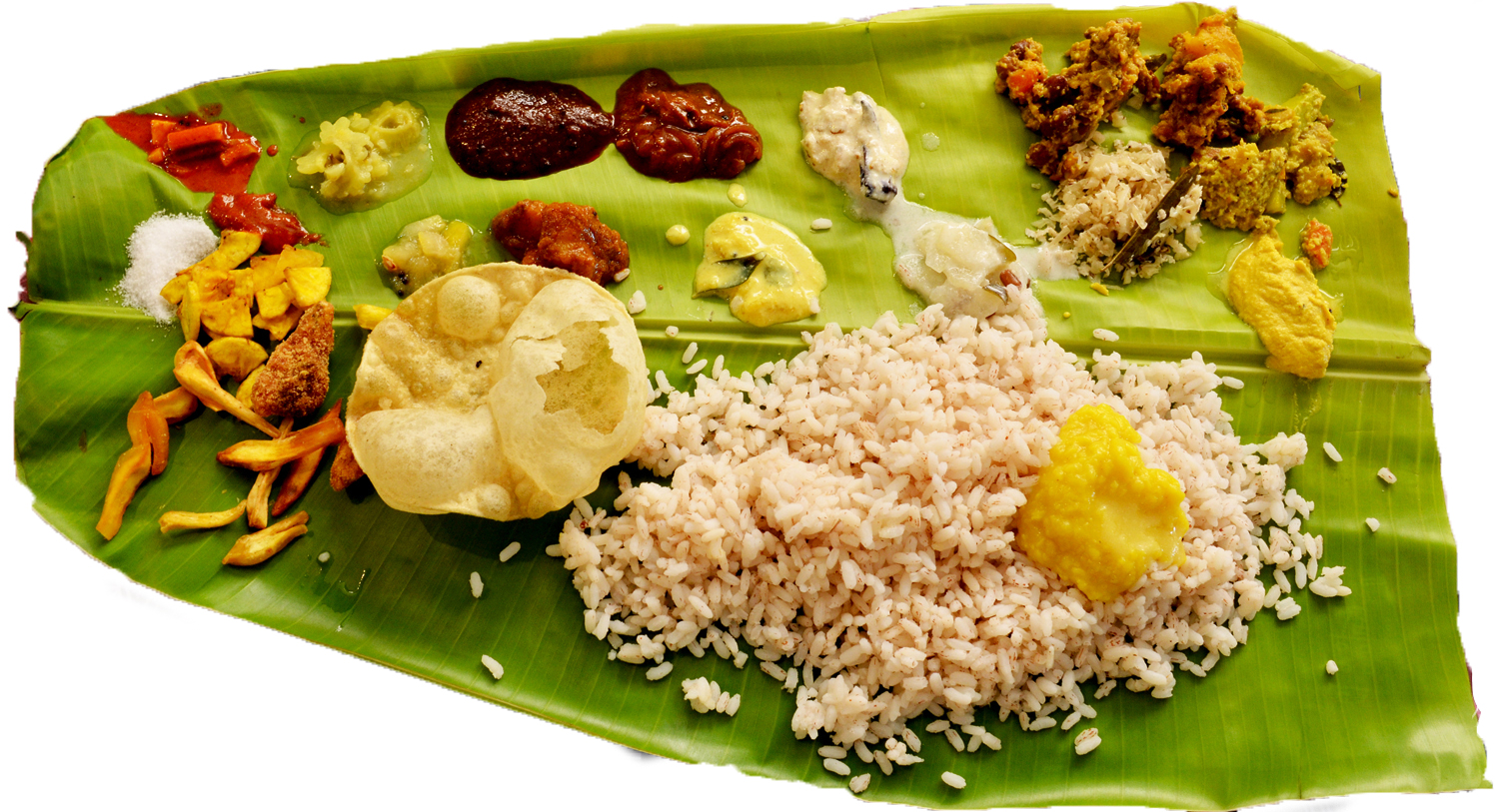
A typical sadhya, where banana leaves are used as plates

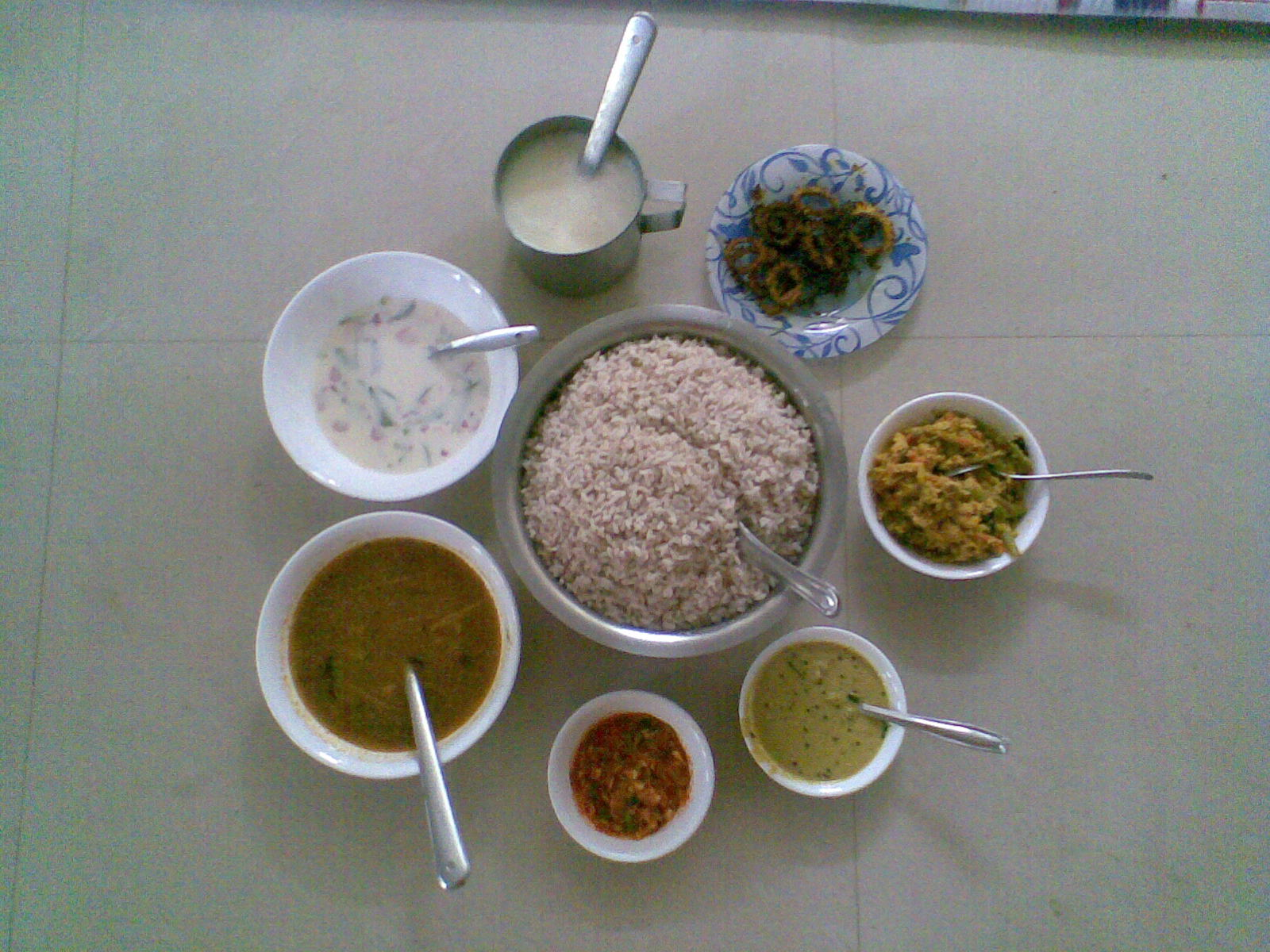
Sadhya items ready to be served. Clockwise from top: paayasam or pradhaman, bitter gourd thoran, aviyal, kaalan, lime pickle, sambar, and buttermilk with boiled rice in center

The vast majority of Kerala's Hindus, except certain communities and ovo-lacto vegetarians, eat fish, red meat (beef, carabeef, and lamb) and chicken. There are many vegetarians in Kerala, as well as throughout India.

=== Mappila cuisine ===
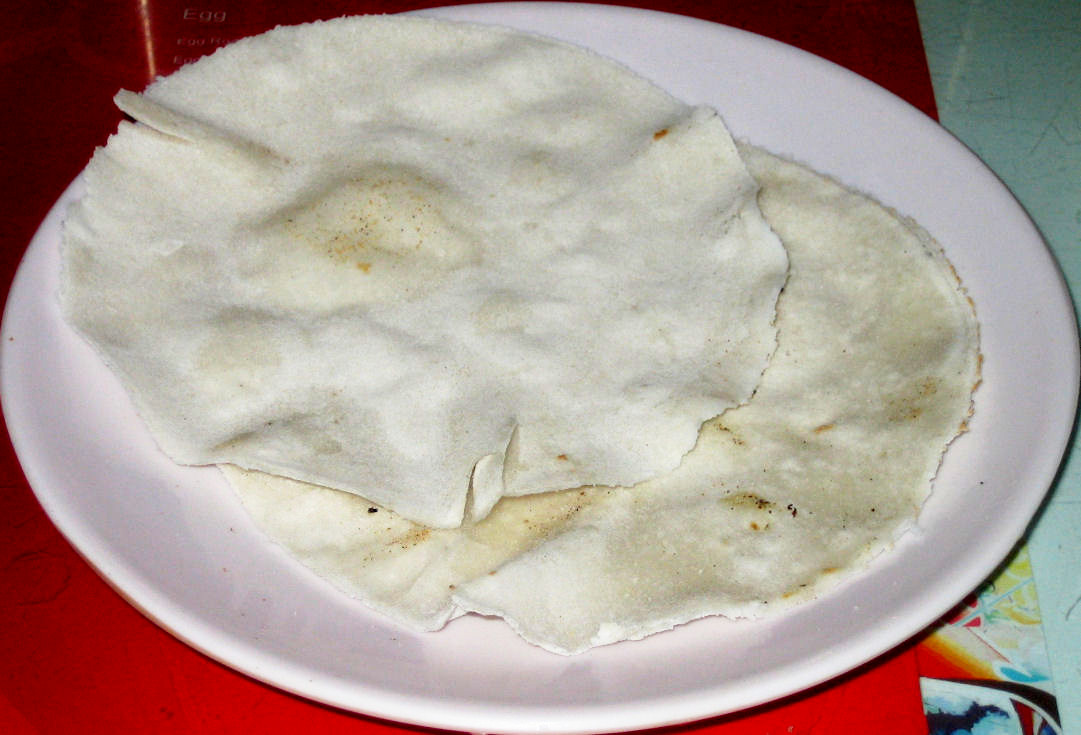
Pathiri, a pancake made of rice flour, is one of the common breakfast dishes among Mappilas

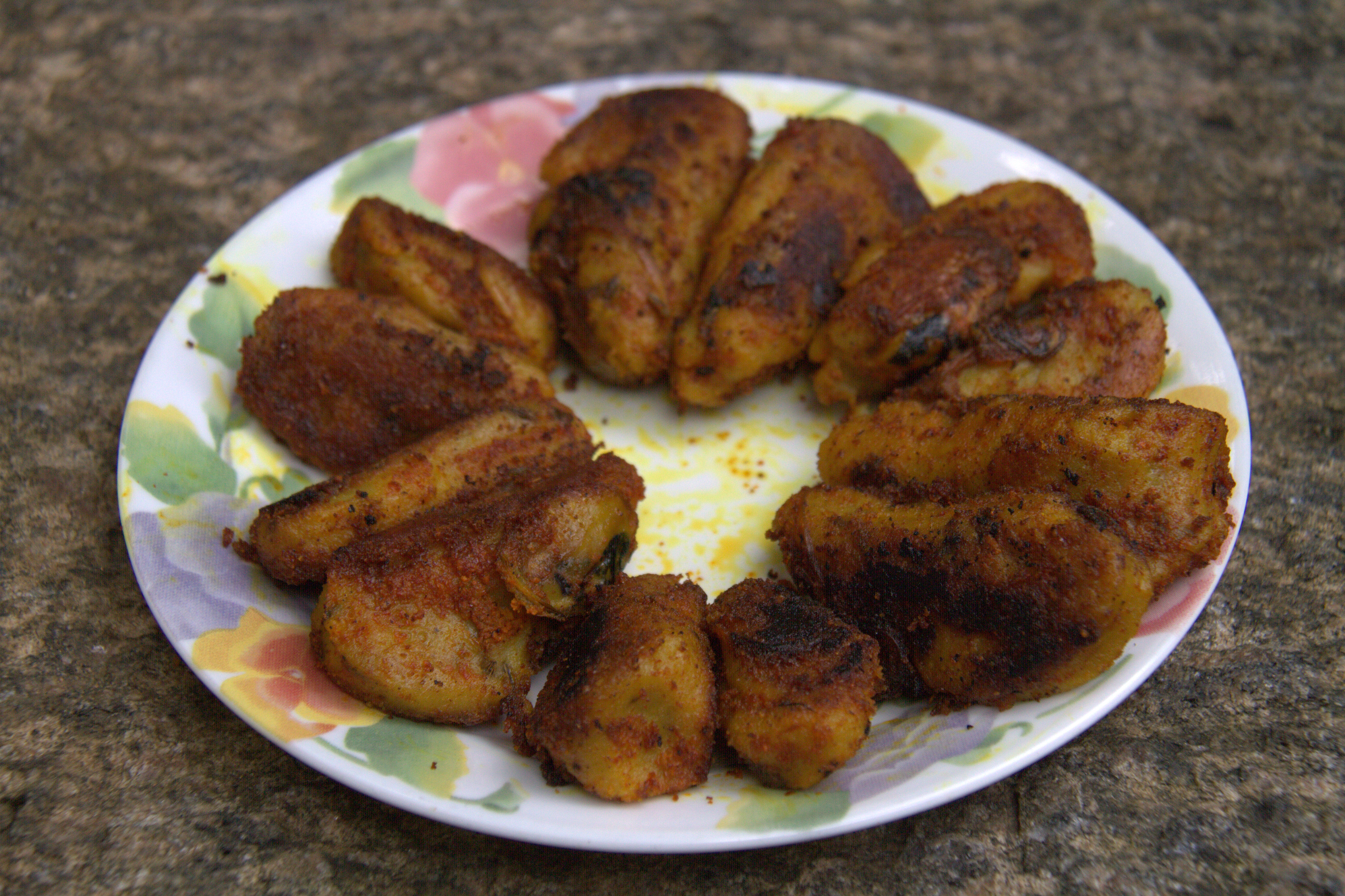
Kallummakkaya nirachathu or arikkadukka (mussels stuffed with rice)

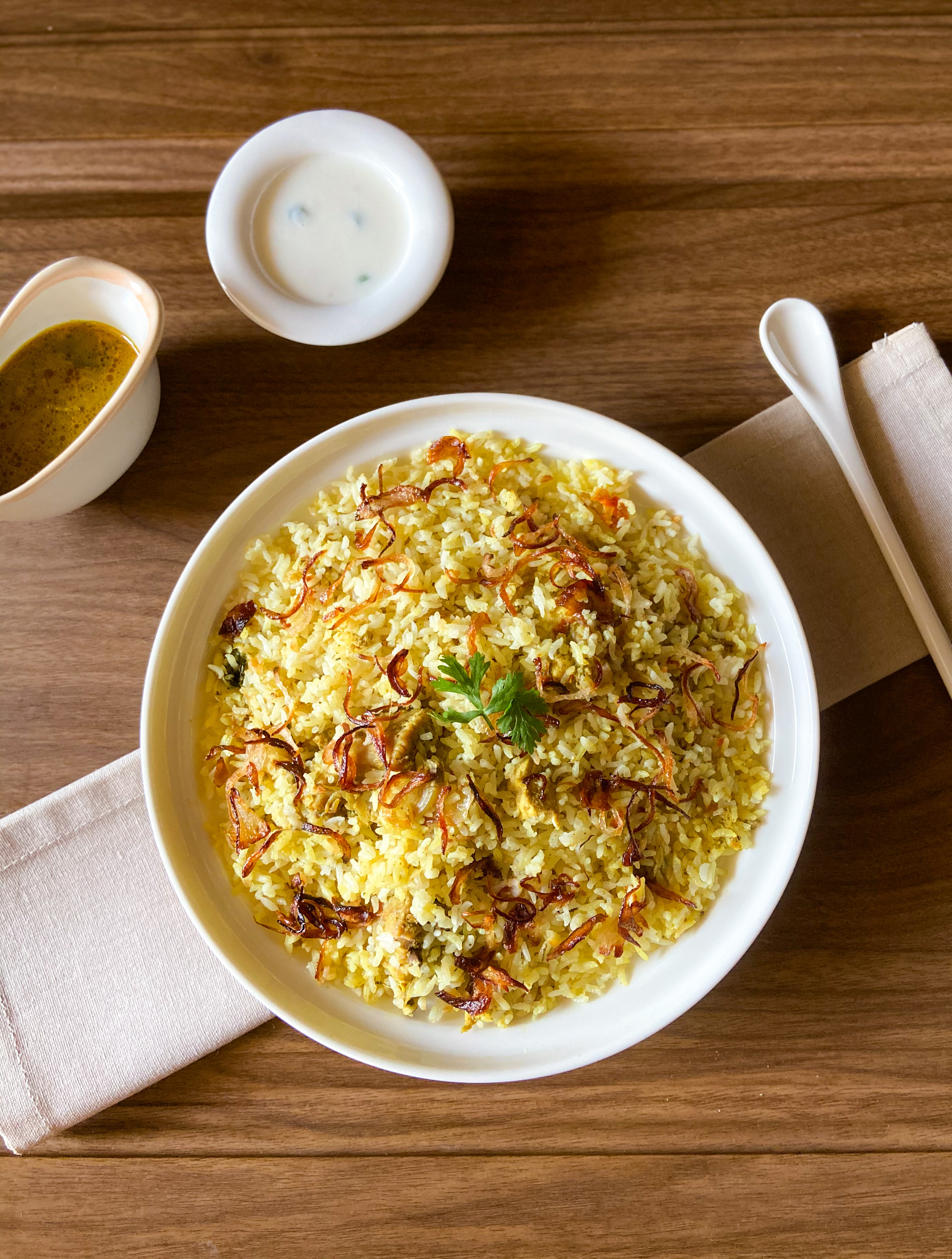
Thalassery biryani with raita

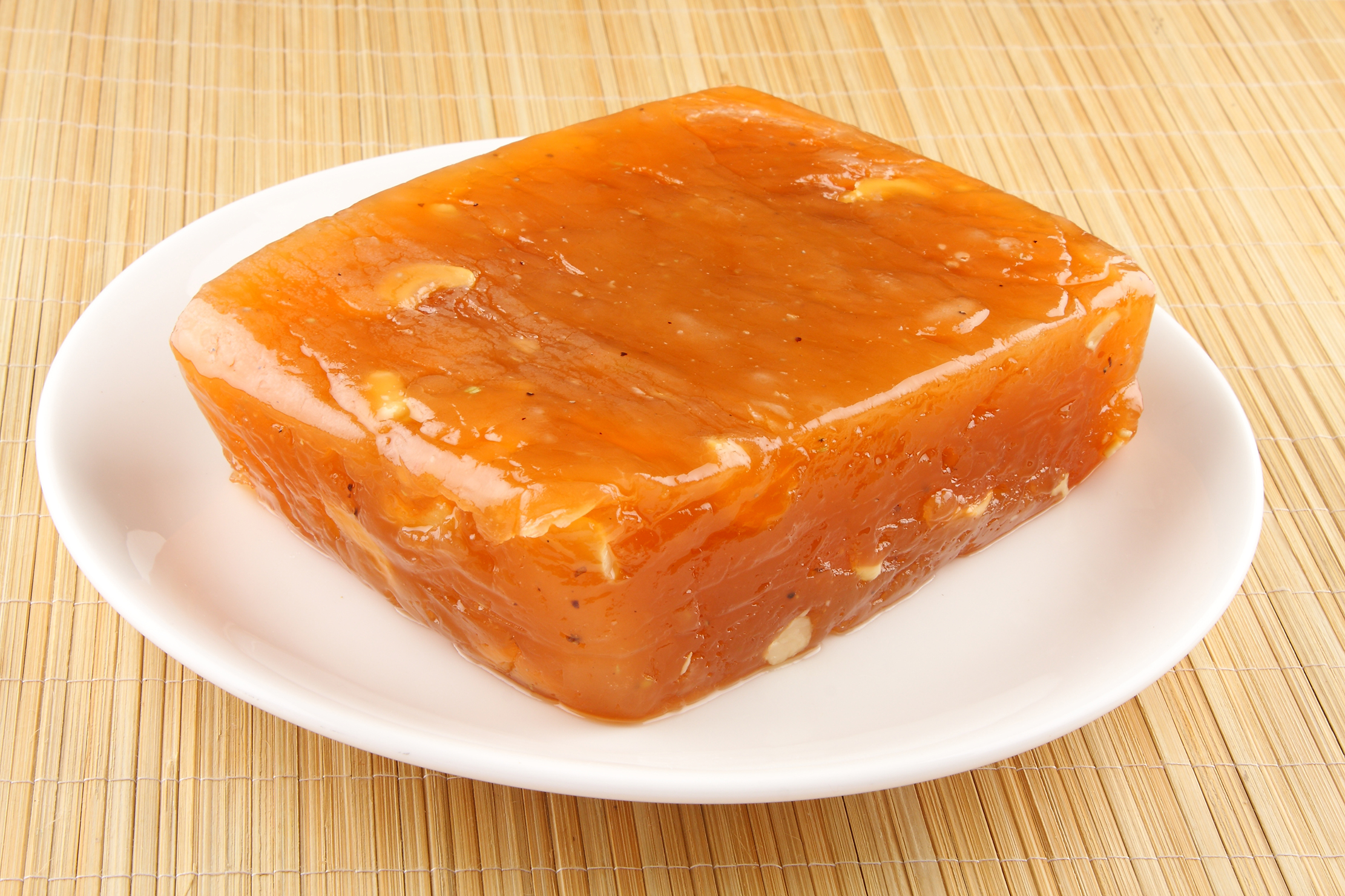
Kozhikode Halwa is popular everywhere in Kerala

Muslim cuisine or Mappila cuisine is a blend of traditional Kerala, Persian, Arab, Portuguese and Western food culture. This confluence of culinary cultures is best seen in the preparation of most dishes. Kallummakkaya (mussels) curry, irachi puttu (irachi meaning meat), Pathiri (a type of rice pancake), and ghee rice are some of the other specialties. The characteristic use of spices is the hallmark of Mappila cuisine—black pepper, cardamom, and clove are used profusely.

Kuzhi Mandi (Mandi (food)) is another popular item, which has an influence from Yemen. Malabar biriyani is known as Thalassery biriyani which uses kaima rice for preparation and is called dum biriyani. Malabar biriyani originated from Thalassery and spread to other places.

The snacks include unnakkaya (deep-fried, boiled ripe banana paste covering a mixture of cashews, raisins and sugar), pazham nirachathu (ripe banana filled with coconut grating, molasses or sugar), muttamala made of eggs, chatti pathiri, a dessert made of flour, like a baked, layered chapati with rich filling, arikkadukka, and more.

=== Christian cuisine ===
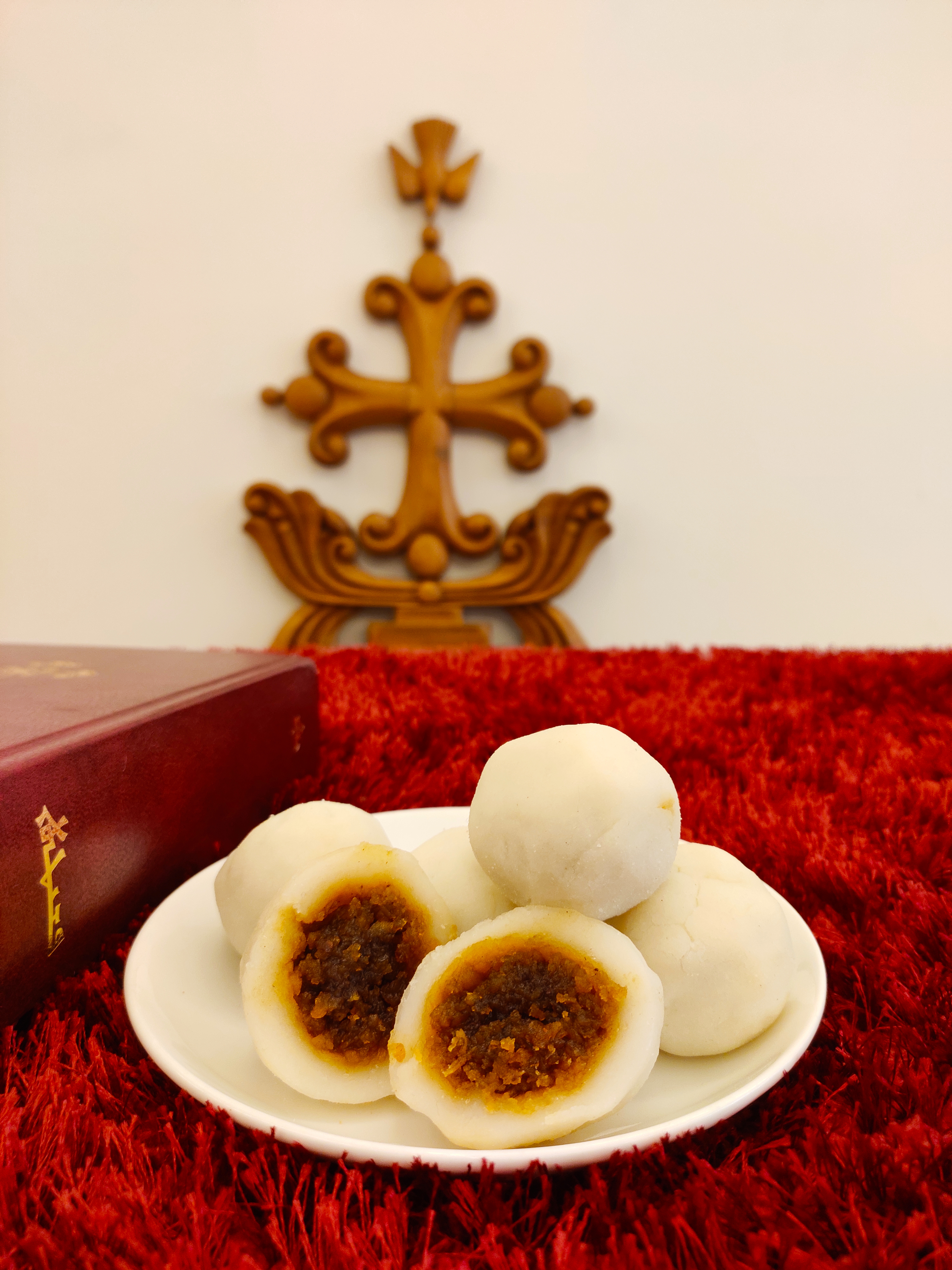
Kozhukkatta is prepared by Saint Thomas Christians on the Saturday prior to Palm Sunday.

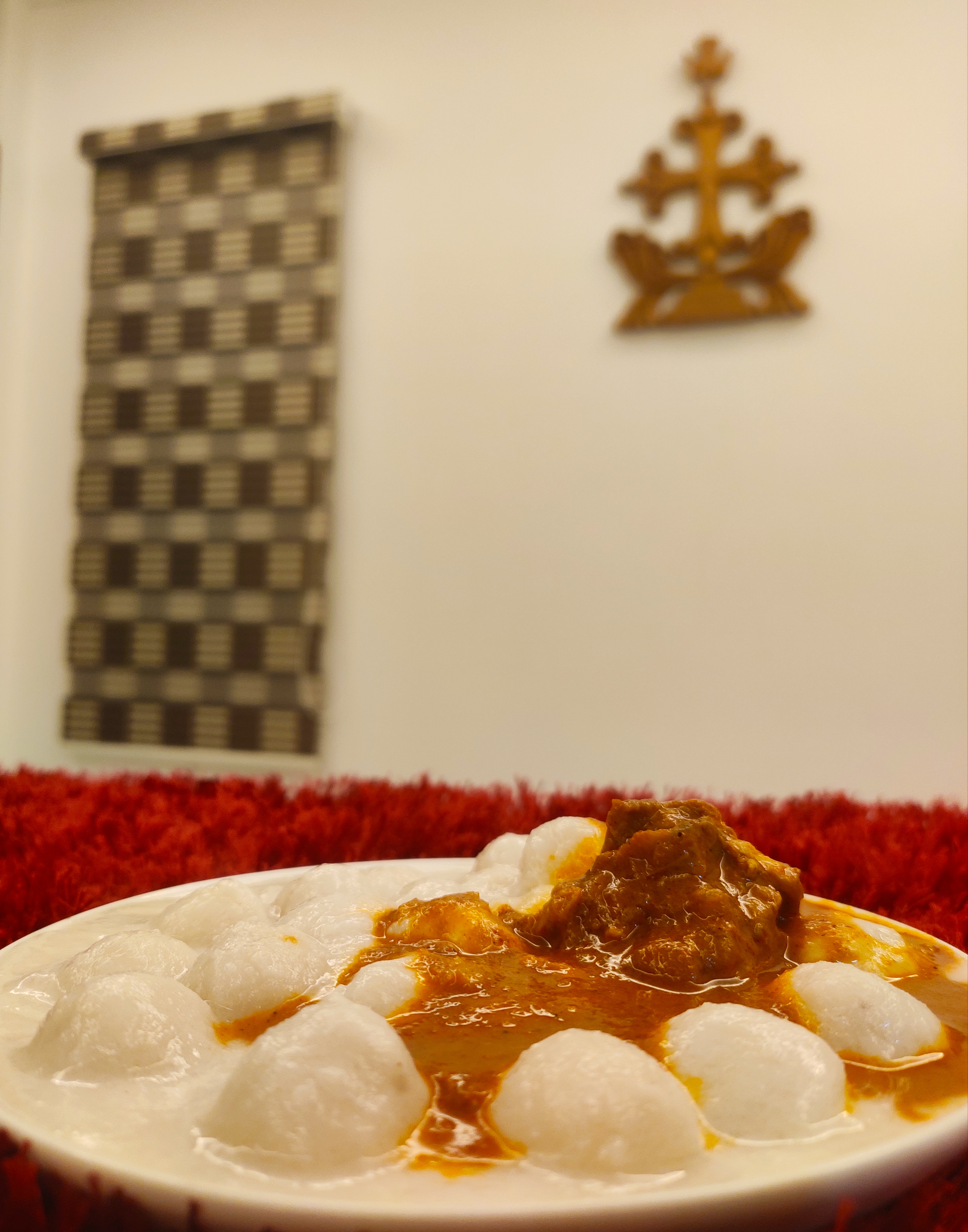
Pidiyum kozhiyum

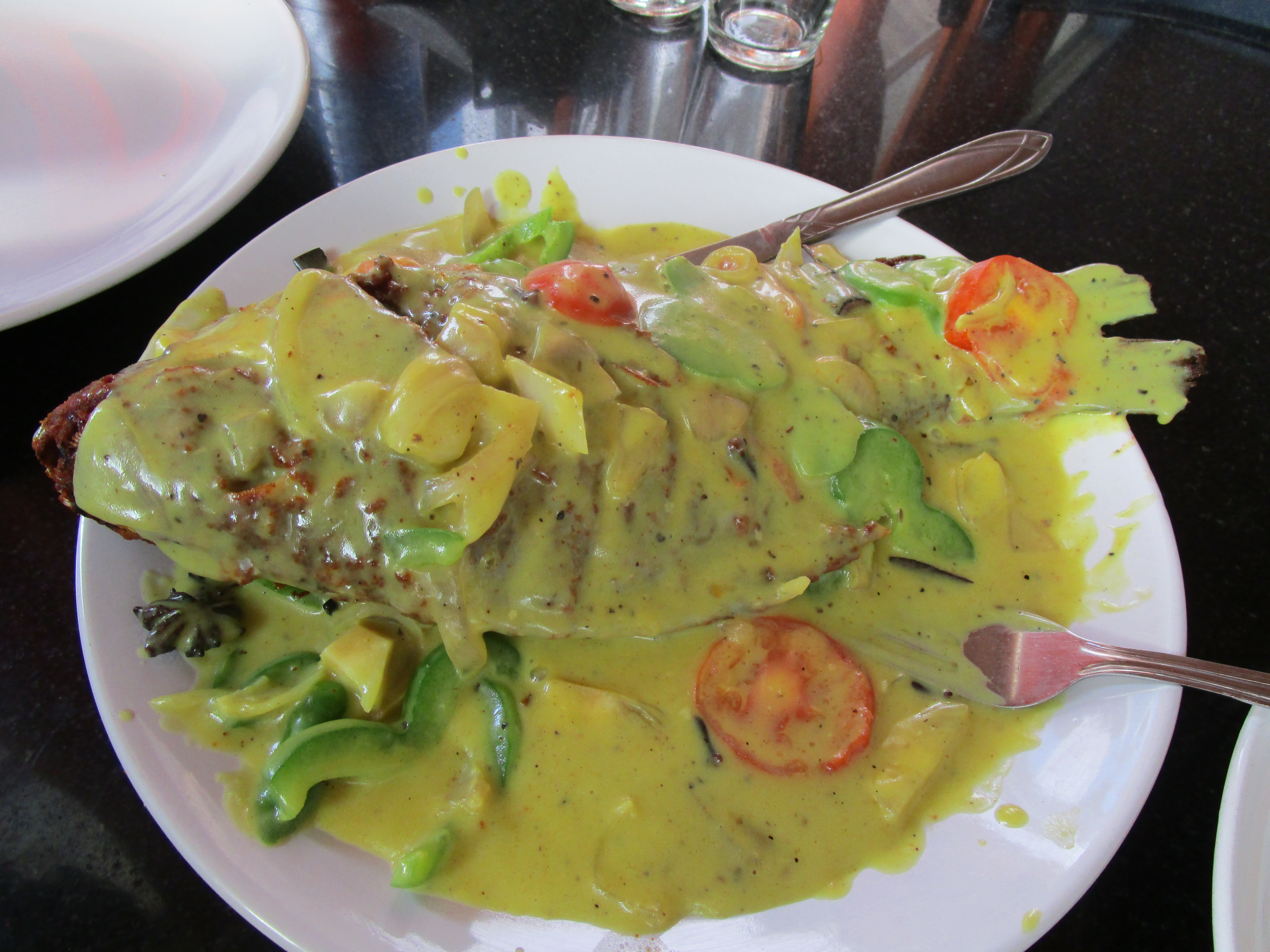
Meen molee

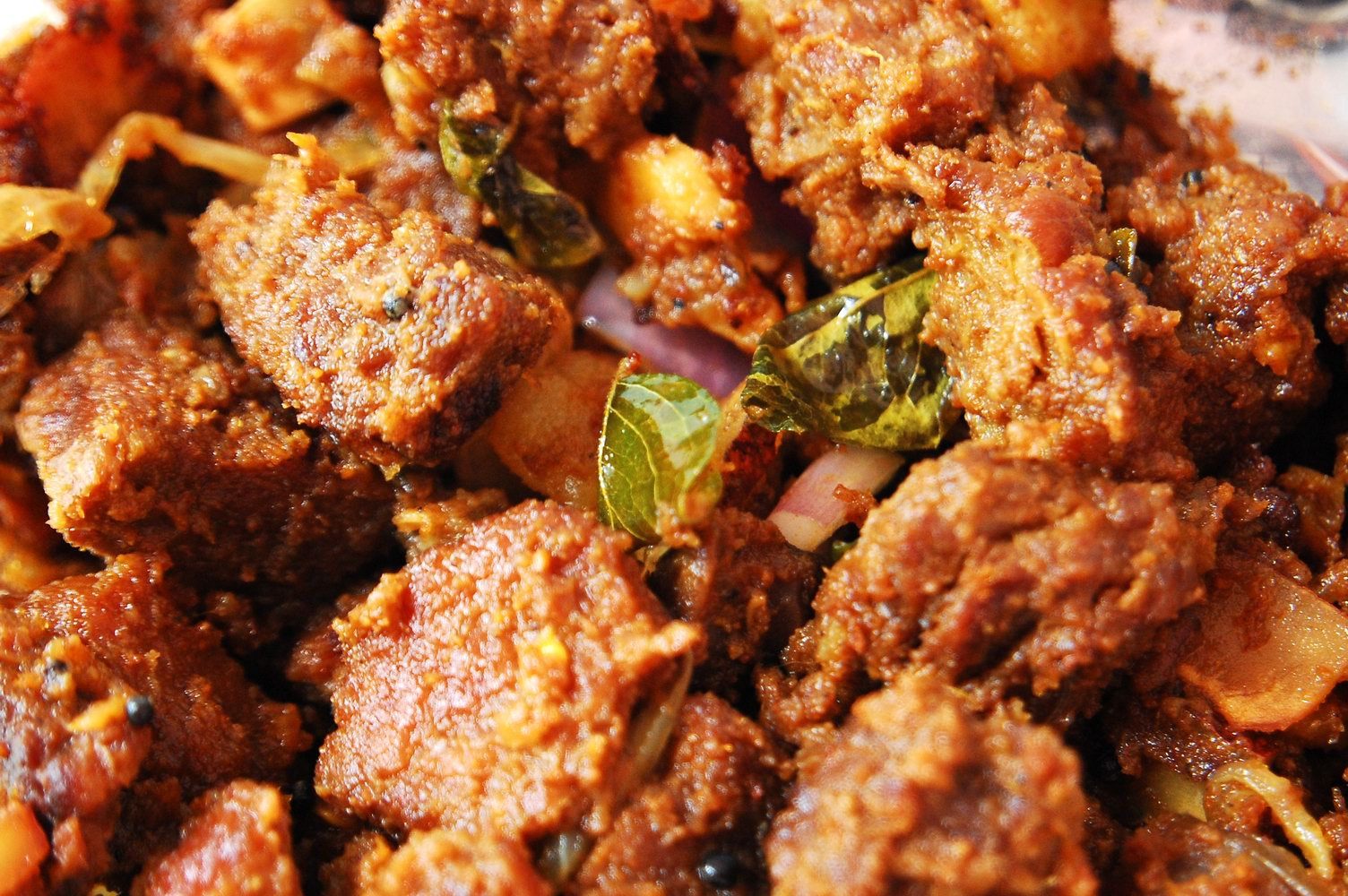
Beef ularthiathu

Christians of Kerala, especially Nasranis (Saint Thomas Christians), have their own cuisine, which is a blend of Indian, Middle Eastern, Syrian, Jewish and Western styles and flavours of cooking.

A commonly served dish among Kerala Christians is mappas, or ishtu. For this dish, chicken or beef, potatoes, carrots, green peas and onions are simmered gently in coconut milk flavoured with black pepper, cinnamon, coriander, mint, cloves, green chillies, lime juice, and shallots. In Central Kerala, this is made only with beef or lamb; the usage of chicken in stew is very rare. Lamb and duck can replace chicken in the stew recipe.

Pidi is another dish made mainly by Syrian Christians from Central Kerala, consisting of dumplings made from rice flour boiled in a mixture of coconut milk, cumin seeds and garlic.

Other dishes include piralen (chicken stir-fried), meat thoran/roast/ullathiyathu (dry curry with shredded coconut), seafood and duck roast, and meen molee (spicy stewed fish). This is eaten with appam. Pork vindaloo and meen mulakittathu or meen vatichathu (fish in fiery red chilli sauce) "are other commonly served items.

Latin Christian ceremonial food includes bread and stew. They are served after cake and wine at the banquet, followed by a meal that includes fish, cutlets, salads, pork, vindaloo, fish moli, duck roast and mustad (mustard and coriander skins fried in vinegar).

Irachi ularthiathu, also known as Kerala beef fry, is a beef dish cooked with spices.
