= Erachichor =

Kerala cuisine

Erachi choru
- Alternative names: Erachichor, Irachi choru
- Type: Rice dish
- Course: Main course
- Place of origin: India
- Region or state: Malabar, northern Kerala
- Main ingredients: Rice, meat (beef, mutton or chicken), spices, coconut

Erachi choru (Malayalam: ഇറച്ചിച്ചോറ്), also written erachichor, is a meat-and-rice dish from the Malabar region of northern Kerala, India. The name joins the Malayalam erachi (meat) and choru (cooked rice). It is a speciality of Kozhikode and is made across Malabar with local variations. The dish resembles biryani in look and taste, but it is made with ordinary boiled rice instead of the layered method of a biryani.

== Preparation ==
Erachi choru is made with beef, mutton or chicken, depending on the cook. The meat is cooked with a paste of ginger, garlic and green chillies and the whole spices of Malabar cooking, among them cinnamon, cardamom, cloves, fennel and star anise, with coconut oil used for frying. The rice is boiled separately, sometimes with coconut milk and spices, and is then mixed into the cooked meat and its gravy.

Set against biryani, erachi choru is quicker to prepare and is not layered, the rice and meat being brought together in one pot at the end. Kozhikode versions grind fresh coconut into the masala.

== See also ==
- Kerala cuisine
