= Chakka prathaman =

Payasam (pudding) of Kerala, India

Chakka Pradhaman
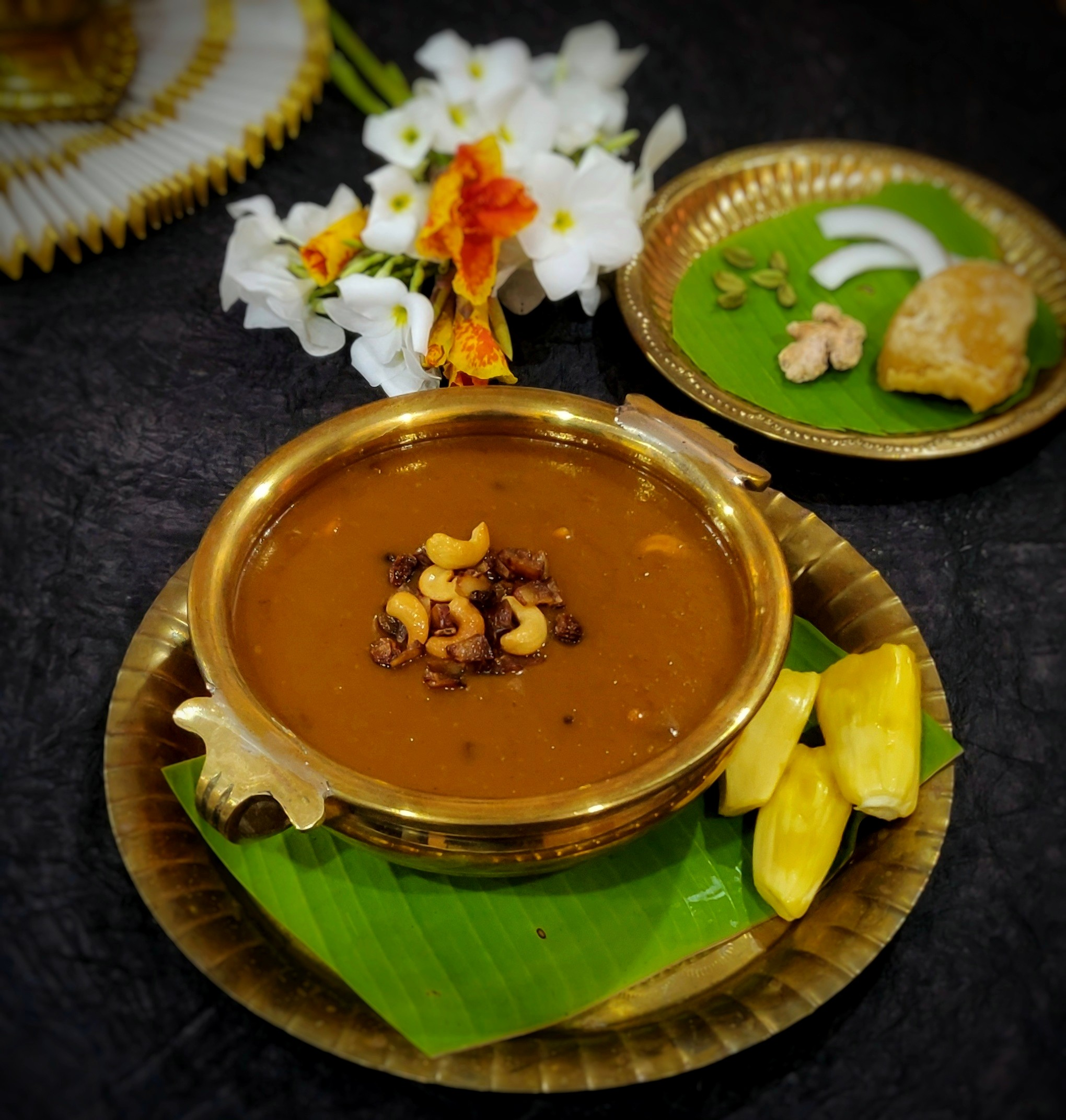
- Chakka prathaman
- Type: Pudding
- Course: Dessert
- Place of origin: India
- Region or state: Kerala
- Main ingredients: Jackfruit, jaggery or sugar, ghee

Chakka prathaman is a traditional payasam (pudding) of Kerala, India.

== Typical preparation ==
The main ingredients of chakka prathaman are chakka varattiyathu and jaggery. Chakka varattiyathu is made by cooking finely chopped pieces of Chakka Chula (the edible yellow part of jackfruit) with ghee and jaggery (or sugar) at a high temperature until it becomes paste-like. The dish is usually prepared in a traditional vessel called an uruli (a heavy casting of bronze), to withstand the high temperature. Once this paste is ready, it can be kept for a long time without losing its taste. Metallic containers may damage the taste, thus it is usually keep in bharani, which are made of porcelain.

To make the prathaman, the 'chakka varattiyathu' is mixed with water and additional jaggery. The mixture is boiled at a high temperature so that the jaggery is dissolved in the water. Grated raw coconut is ground with water and the milk is added to this mixture. For garnishing, small pieces of coconut, cashew nut, or currants fried in ghee may be added into it.

The dish is usually served hot. It is made more often in Kerala than in other south Indian states.

== See also ==
- Ada pradhaman
