= Poornalu =

Indian dessert dumpling

Boorelu
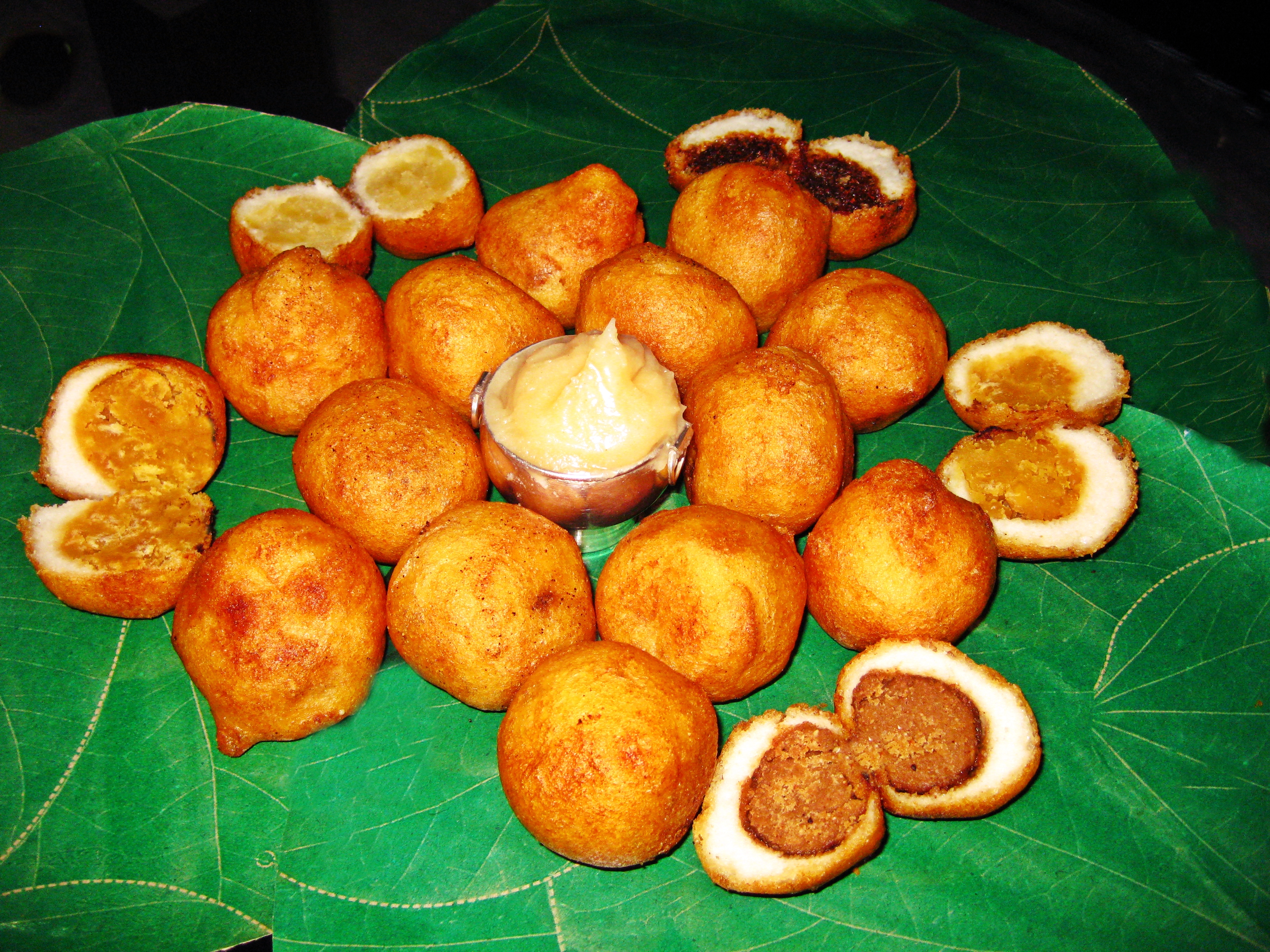
- Alternative names: Poornam Boorelu
- Course: Dessert
- Place of origin: India
- Region or state: Andhra Pradesh, Telangana and Karnataka
- Serving temperature: Hot
- Main ingredients: Rice flour, jaggery, chanadal paste

Poornalu, purnalu, boorelu (Telugu: బూరెలు) or burelu is an Indian sweet and dumpling made of rice flour stuffed with jaggery mixed dal paste and dry fruits. It is often served hot with ghee. It is called poornam in Telangana and Andhra Pradesh. Poornam preparation follows the traditional methods common to all South Indian cuisines. Poornam Boorelu are traditionally prepared using a rice-urad dal batter, and then packed with some shredded dry fruits and channa dal mixture known as poornam and it is then deep-fried in oil until golden brown.

== History ==
The first occurrence of Poornalu is not known. However it has been an integral part of the menu in most Telugu festivals and occasions. Like most other Telugu dishes, Poornalu also uses urad dal as its main ingredient since in Southern India; urad dal has long been the most commonly grown pulse.

== Serving ==
Poornalu is mostly served after the main course and rarely as an evening snack in most Telugu households. Often Poornalu is served along with ghee to enhance its flavour. Preferably it is better consumed hot. It is made in abundance during the famous Makar Sankranti – the festival of harvest. During this time, poornalu is made exuberantly and most heartily and distributed among friends, relatives and neighbours. Poornalu is often served at weddings and other festivities. The preparation and serving of poornalu, however, undergoes minor alterations from place to place.

== Other names ==
Poornalu is also called suyyam, seeyam, sukiyan, sugeelu or sugunta in various parts of Southern India. It is also often termed as Poornam Boorelu(Telugu: పూర్ణం బూరెలు) in Andhra Pradesh and Telangana and Poornalu(పూర్ణాలు) seems to be the shortened form of it.

== See also ==
- List of stuffed dishes
