= Malabar matthi curry =

Indian dish

Malabar fish curry
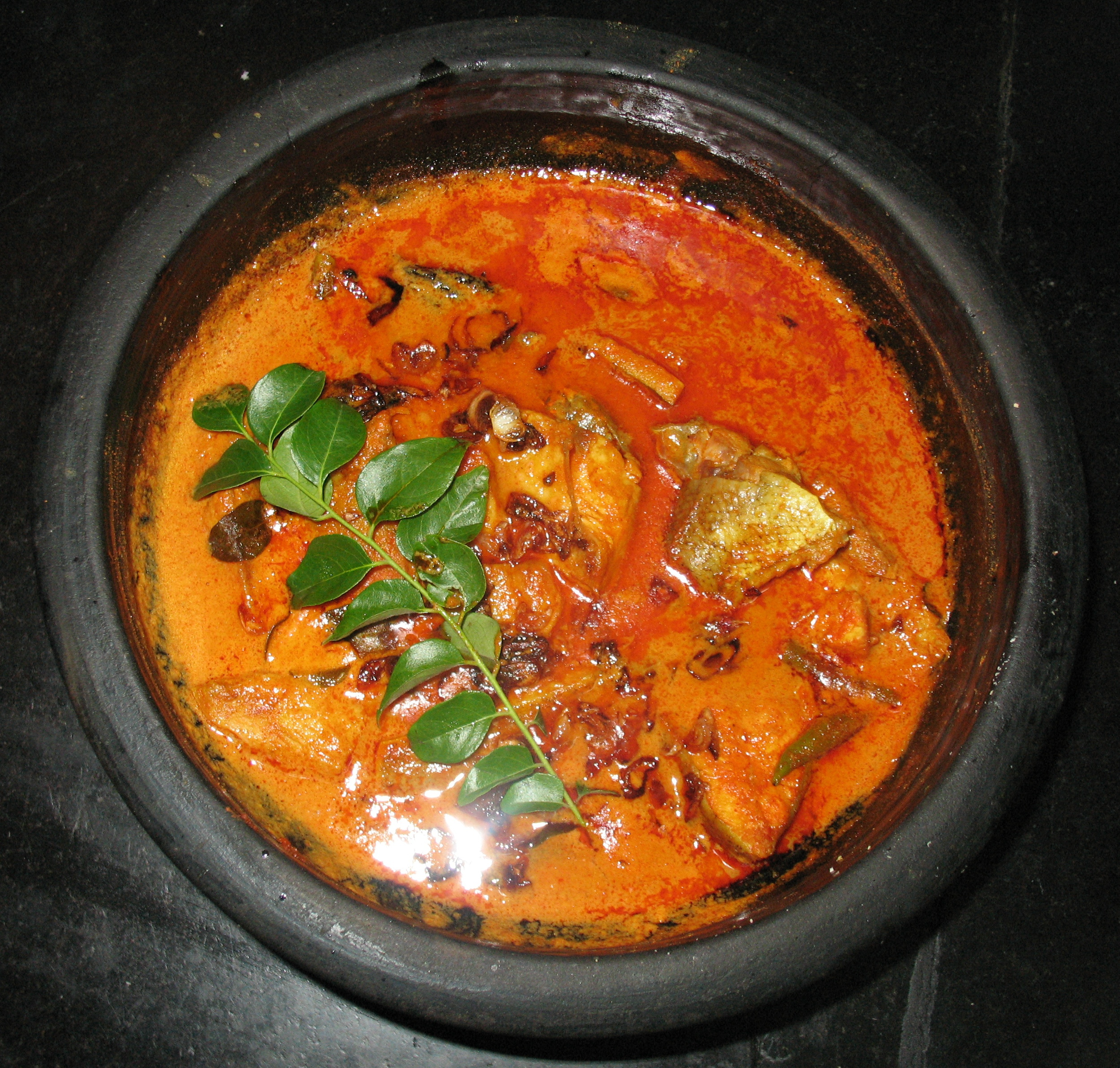
- Kerala-style fish curry
- Alternative names: Fish curry
- Type: Curry
- Place of origin: India
- Associated cuisine: India, Sri Lanka
- Main ingredients: Sardines, curry, vegetables (okra or onions); rice or tapioca

Malabar matthi curry, also known as fish curry, is a traditional Kerala dish. It is usually prepared with fish semi-stewed in a Kerala-style sauce that typically includes a blend of spices and assorted vegetables, such as okra or onions. While sardines are commonly used, the dish can be prepared with a variety of fish, such as mackerel, kingfish, or pomfret. It is usually served with rice or tapioca. The dish is most popular in Kerala, Goa, and Sri Lanka, where rice and fish are staple foods. Other variations may include adding tamarind juice or coconut milk.

== History ==
The origins of the modern dish can be traced back to Tamil Nadu and Kerala.

== Preparation ==
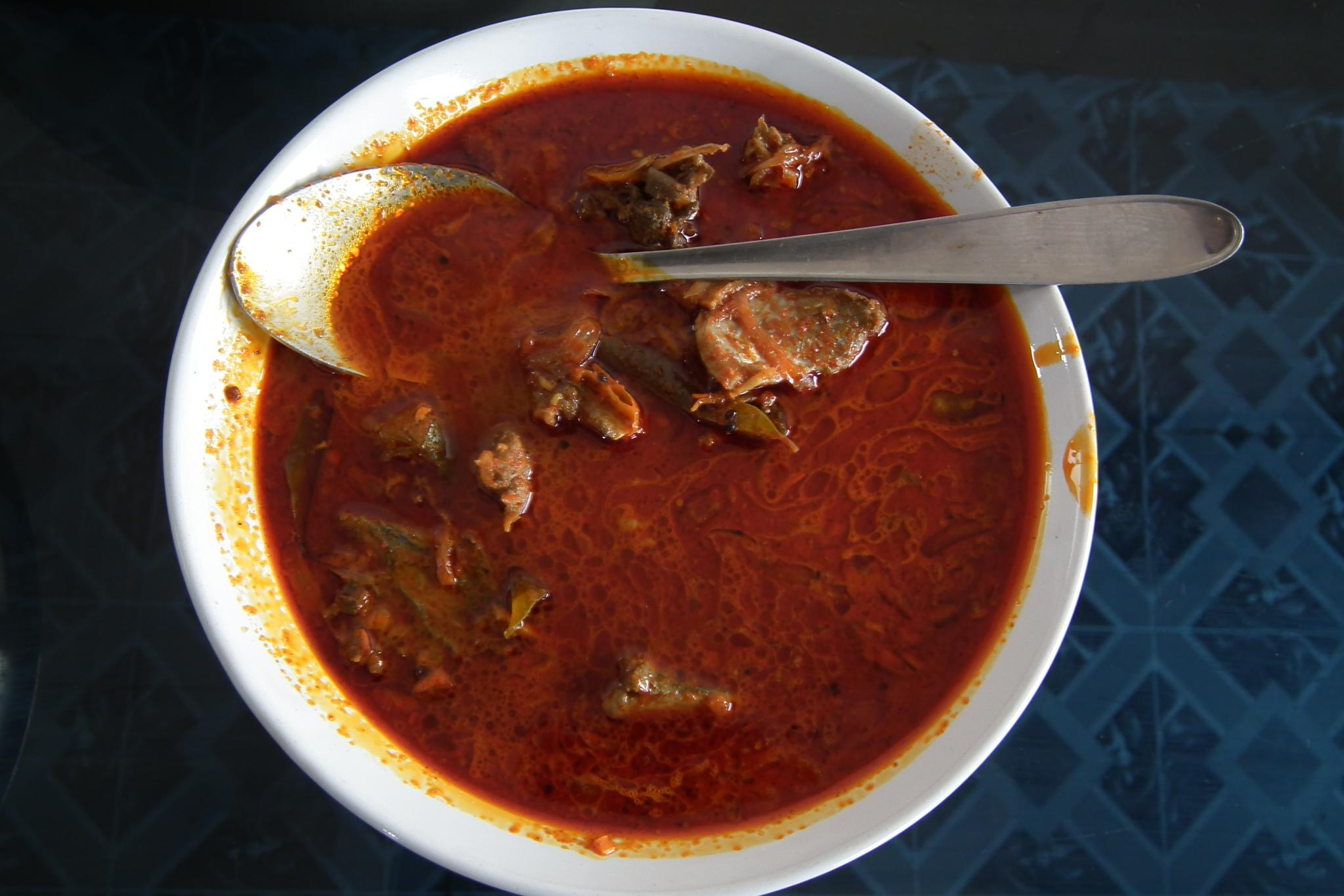
Kerala spicy fish curry

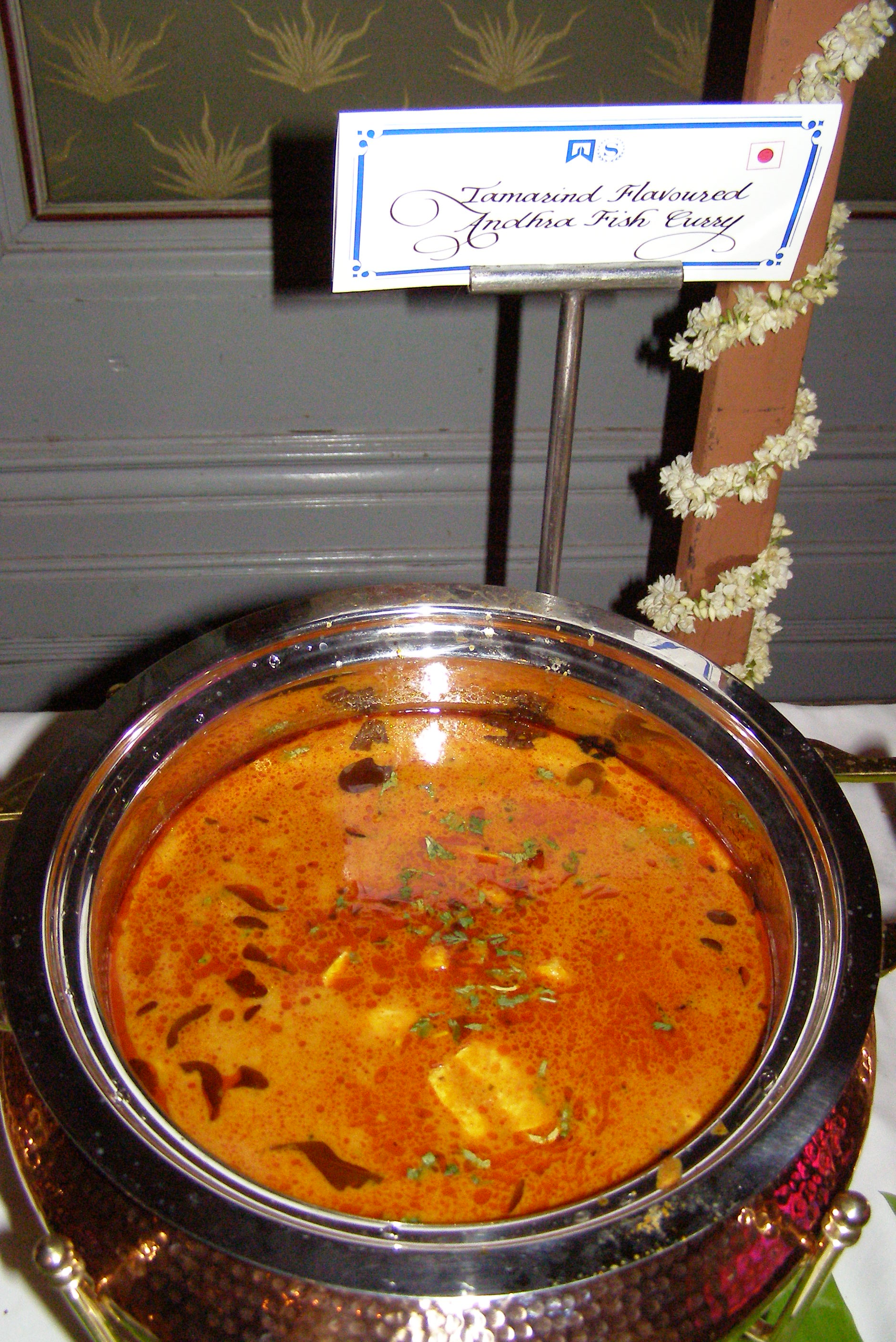
Tamarind Andhra fish curry

The curry is often made in a single pot. Sliced shallots, garlic, ginger, slit green chillies, turmeric, chilli, salt, curry leaves, coconut oil and pieces of kudampuli are mixed together with water and brought to the boil, and the sardines are then added one at a time. The pot is covered and left to cook, and rather than stirring it, which would break the fish, the cook swirls or shakes the pot to move the gravy around. Once the fish is done the lid comes off and the gravy is reduced until it thickens. Fenugreek seeds browned in a little coconut oil are stirred in at the end.

Kudampuli, the dried rind of Garcinia gummi-gutta or Malabar tamarind, is the souring agent that gives the curry its character.

The curry is largely cooked at home in earthenware. Ann Rose Davis, writing in the Journal of Ethnic Foods, records that Kerala fish curry is traditionally made in a meen chatti or clay pot set on a stone stove, and that cooks hold the pot itself to improve the flavour. The dish keeps without refrigeration, which is part of why it is made ahead for events. It can be prepared a day or two in advance and left at room temperature, needing only reheating each morning. Cooks also hold that the flavour improves overnight.

Similar fish curries are also eaten in Sri Lanka and other countries. The dish is also mass-produced, processed and packaged in cans and flexible pouches for consumer purchase.

== See also ==
- Kedgeree
- Machher jhol
- Fish head curry
- Cuisine of Kerala
- Indian cuisine
- Cuisine of Malaysia
- Cuisine of Singapore
