= Ada pradhaman =

Traditional dessert from Kerala, India

Ada Pradhaman
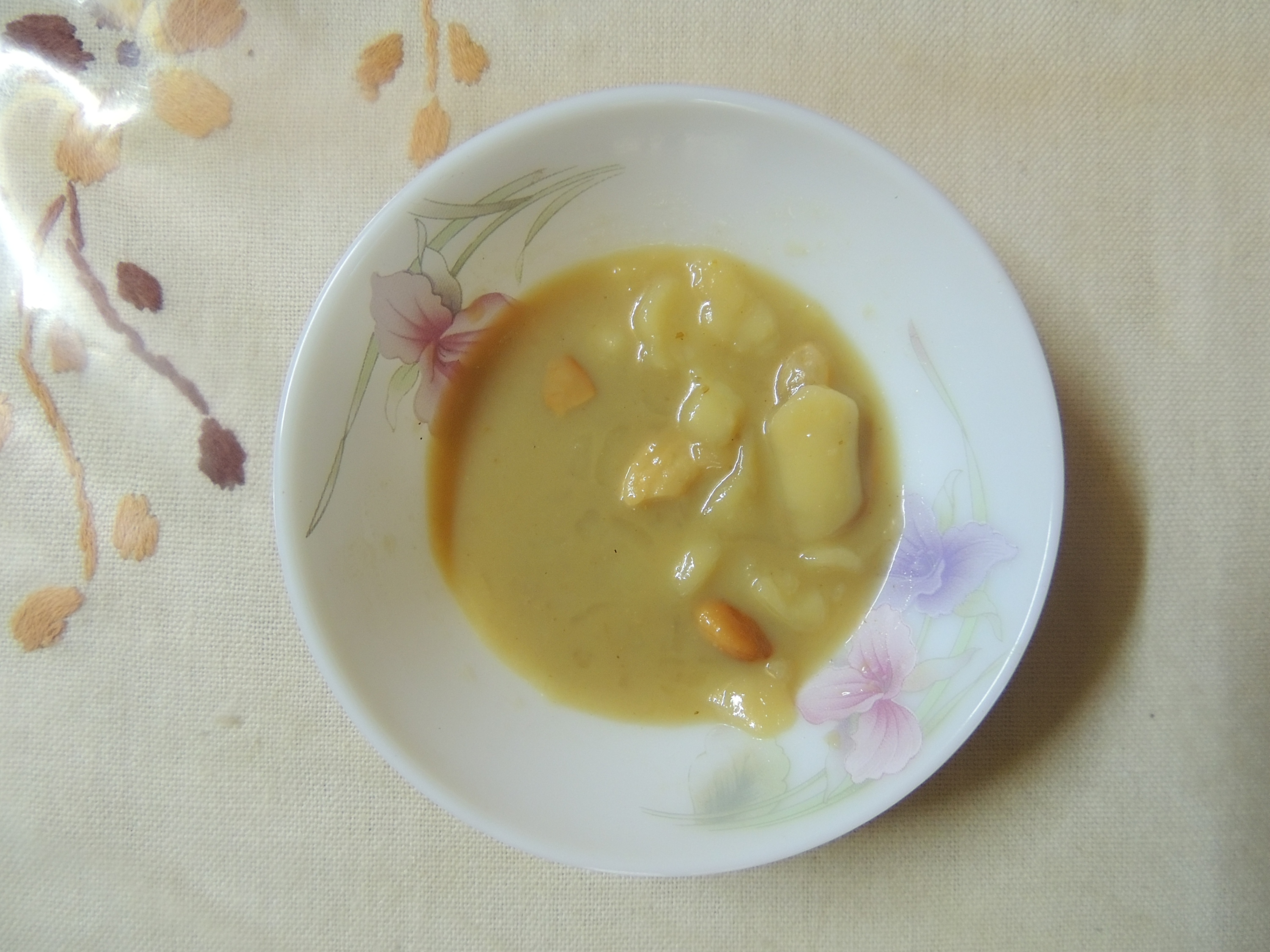
- Ada pradhaman
- Type: Pudding
- Course: Dessert
- Place of origin: India
- Region or state: Kerala
- Main ingredients: Rice ada, Coconut milk, jaggery or sugar, ghee

Ada pradhaman is a traditional Keralite dessert made by using the rice ada (rice pasta or flakes) with a sauce of cooked coconut milk and jaggery. Ada pradhaman is specially prepared in homes of the state of Kerala in India on the festival day of Onam. It is a variety of payasam, and is served together with sadya.

== Typical preparation ==
Cooked rice ada is added to coconut milk, then topped with a jaggery syrup and other ingredients such as nuts, raisins, and cardamom powder.

The dish is usually served hot. It is one of the most common desserts in Kerala.

== Palada Pradhaman ==
Palada Pradhaman or Palada Payasam is a type of Payasam made with Pal (milk), rice ada, sugar, cardamom powder, nuts and raisins. Palada Pradhaman or palada payasam is offered specially to devotees as Prasada in Kerala Temples.

== See also ==
- Chakka prathaman
