= Chakkavaratti =

Jackfruit based sweet snack from Kerala

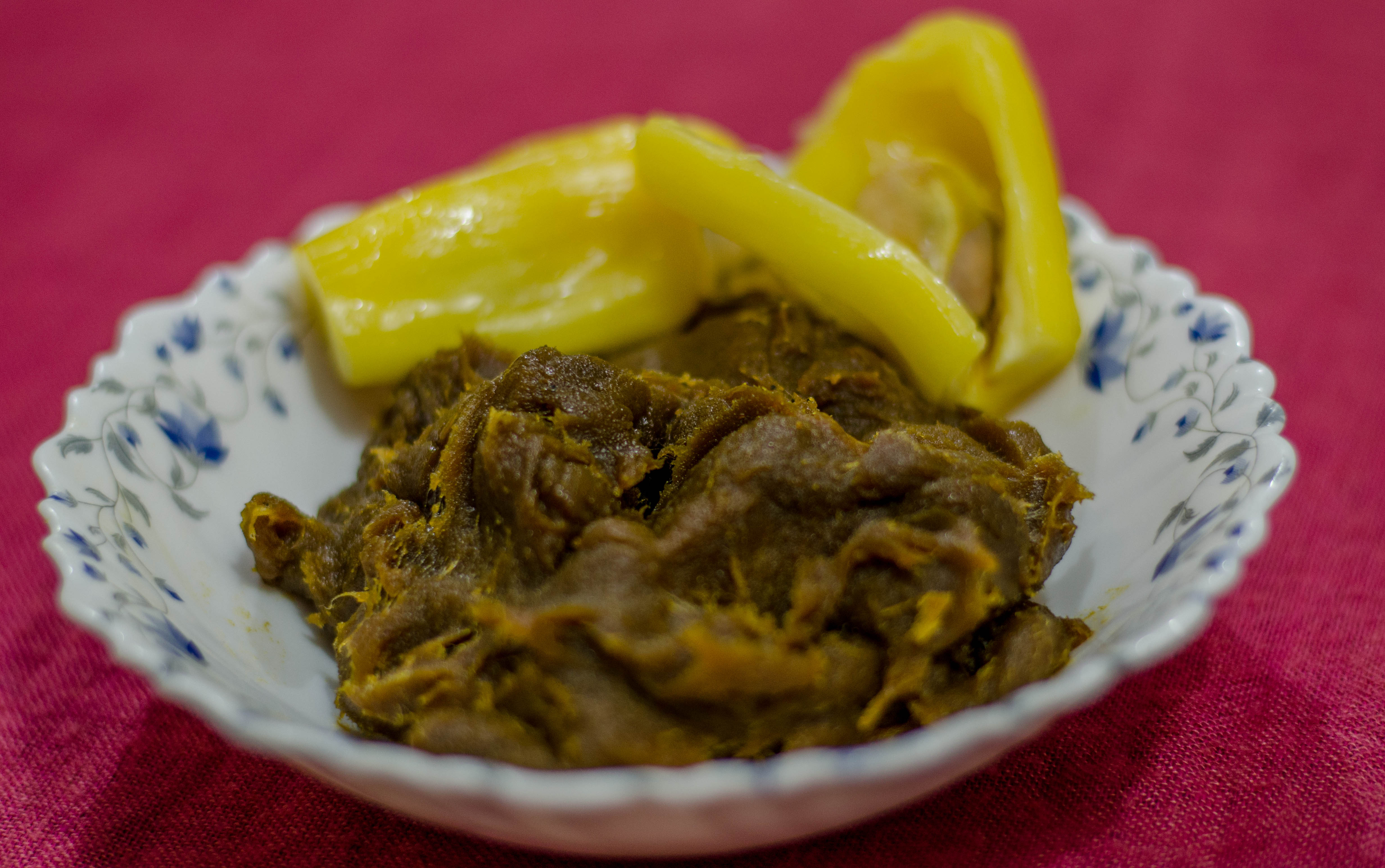
Chakkavaratti (jackfruit jam)

Chakkavaratty, chakka varattiyathu, chakka varatti, jackfruit preserves or jackfruit halwa is a type of food made from jackfruit. The seeds are removed from the fruit and it is cut into small pieces. The fruit is then cooked with ghee and jaggery; it eventually reaches a paste- or jam-like consistency. After cooling it can be eaten; and it keeps for six to ten months. Malayalis prepare ada with this chakkavaratti as a special food.
