= Pidiyum kozhiyum =

Traditional food item of Kerala

Pidiyum Kozhiyum
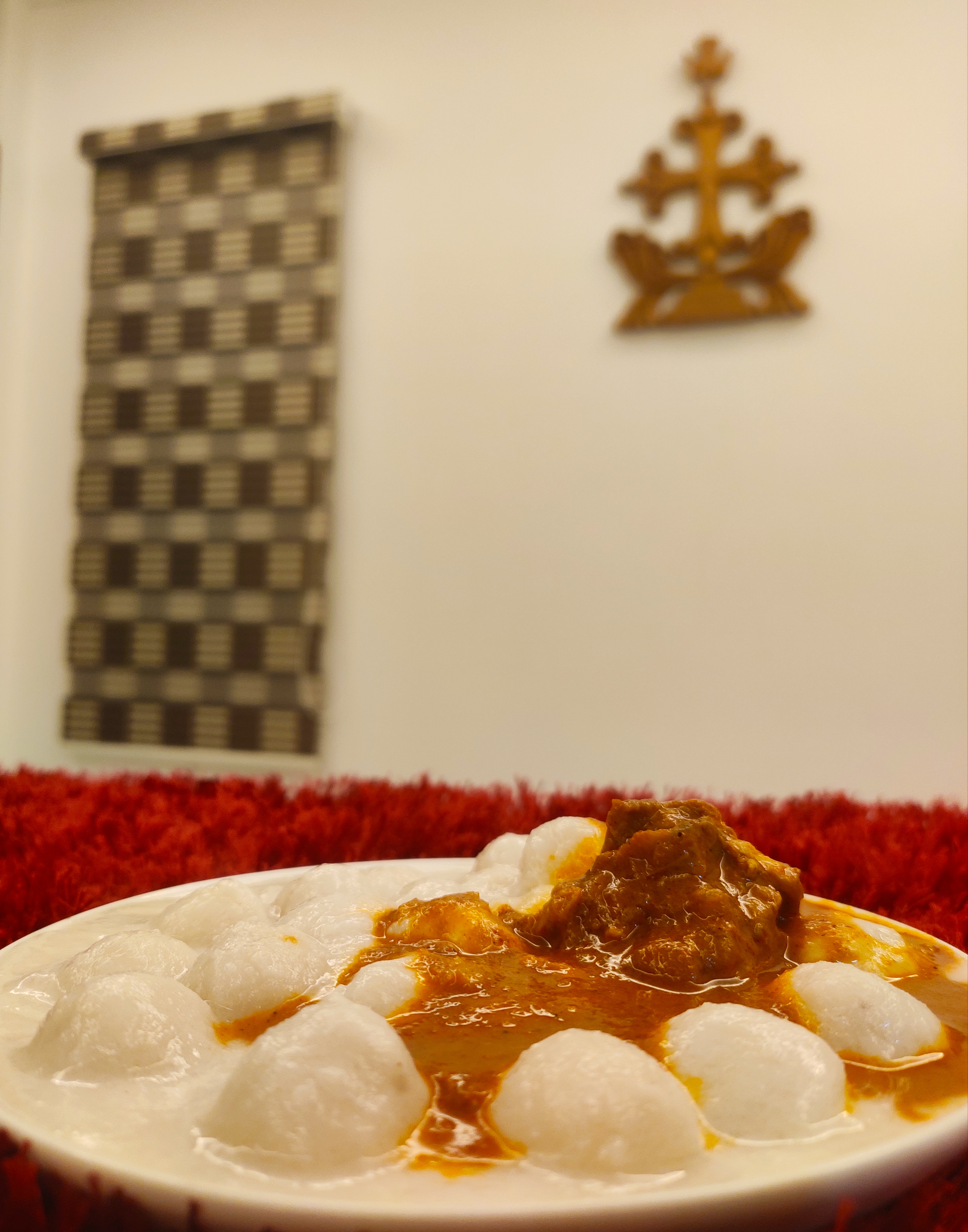
- Pidi and Kozhi
- Place of origin: India
- Region or state: Kerala
- Associated cuisine: India
- Main ingredients: Grated coconut, Chicken, rice flour

Pidiyum Kozhiyum is a traditional food item of St. Thomas Christians in Kerala. It is a kind of dish which can be consumed for breakfast or dinner. Term 'Pidi' stands for a whitish semi-liquid dish with small boiled balls of finely powdered rice. The 'Kozhi' in 'Pidiyum Kozhiyum' stands for chicken curry, which is prepared with traditional ingredients.

It has some similarities with Italian Gnocchi, in preparation and texture. Instead of wheat and potato to make pidi just use rice flour and cumin for flavor.

'Pidiyum Kozhiyum' is a symbolic dish that represents the 'Manna' and 'Quaill' that Yahweh provided to Israelites in the desert, during their journey from Egypt to the Promised Land. The dish in those days was expensive and was exclusively prepared for special occasions or more commonly in the houses of wealthy families. That was because its ingredients were too expensive. This dish is influenced by the dish 'Kozhikkotta' or 'Panchara Unda' or 'Chakkara Unda'.

== Preparation ==
The pidi are made by grinding rice into a paste, mixing it with grated coconut and cumin, and rolling it into small balls about the size of a lemon. These are boiled in water flavoured with a ground paste of shallots, garlic, curry leaves, and cumin until they cook through and the liquid turns into a thick gravy. Coconut milk is stirred in to enrich it, and the dish is finished with a tempering of mustard seeds, curry leaves, and coconut oil. It is eaten with a chicken curry, and is prepared especially at Christmas and New Year in Kerala.

== Religious importance ==
'Pidiyum Kozhiyum is blessed and served as a part of a religious ceremony, 'Panthrandu Sleehanmaarude Nercha' or the ' to Twelve Apostles', a traditional ceremony related to Syrian Orthodox Christians (known as Syrian Jacobite Christians) and Syro Malabar Christians in which blessed food is served to twelve boy children under the age of 15. Those twelve boy children denotes the twelve apostles of Jesus Christ.
