= Sukiyan =

Indian snack

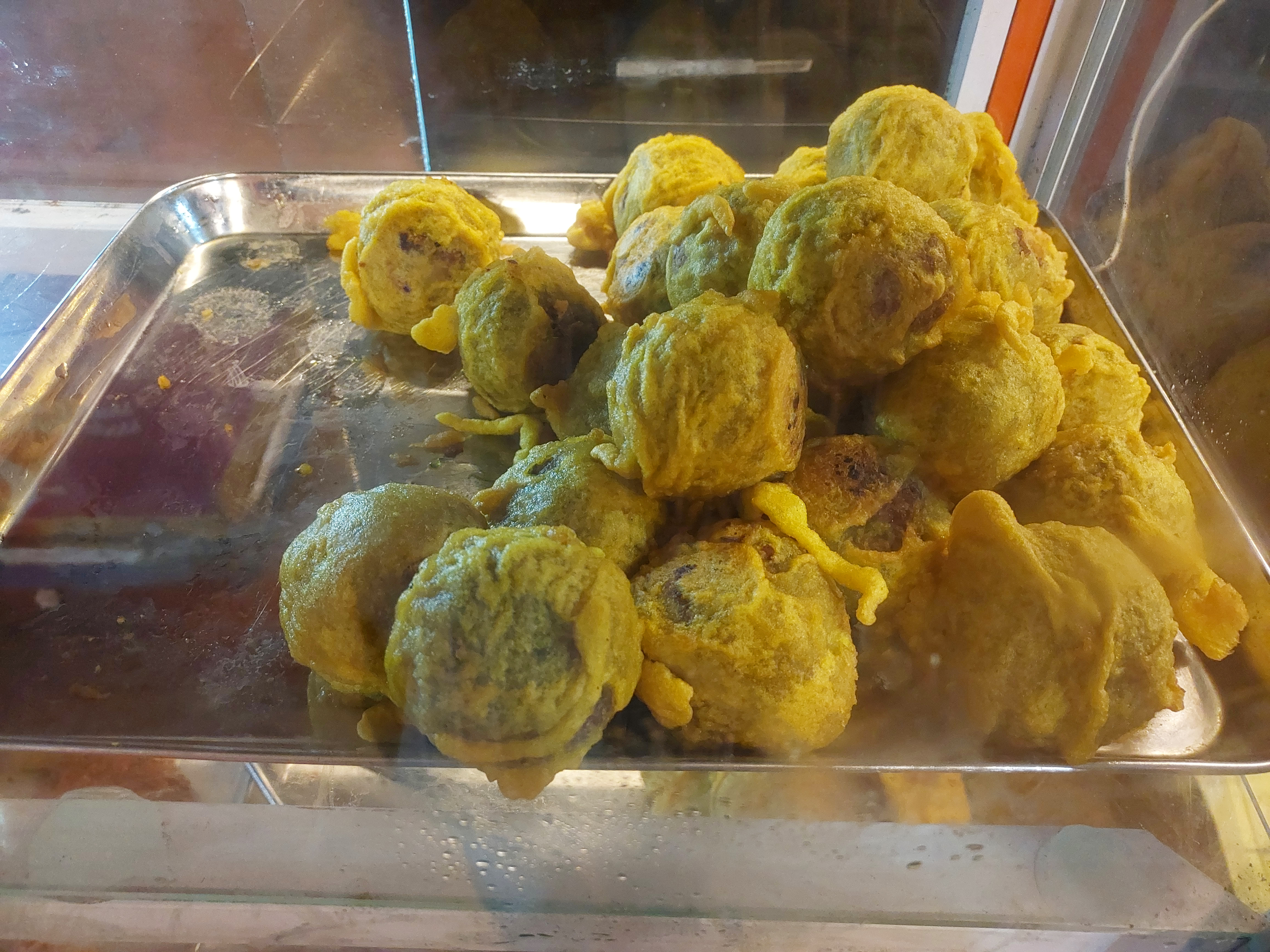
- Sukiyans at a restaurant
- Place of origin: India
- Region or state: Kerala
- Serving temperature: Hot
- Main ingredients: Maida flour, Mung beans, Jaggery, water

Sukiyan (or sukhiyan or sugiyan) is a fritter food made with pulses, jaggery and maida flour. Also called "Suguntalu", it is a popular food item in South Indian cuisines, and it is generally eaten as a breakfast, a side dish, or a snack. The lentils (mung beans) and jaggery are cooked, ground to form the stuffing, formed into the size of a ping pong ball, to finally deep fry in coconut oil / any other oil. This snack is also often found in small tea shops in the towns and villages of Kerala and Tamil Nadu.

== Preparation ==
Sukiyan is prepared by cooking mung beans in water and it is drained out. Boiled Jaggery and grated coconut are mixed with the cooked beans. Add cardamom powder, cumin powder and dried ginger powder. Small balls made out of this mixture are kept aside. This is then coated with a combination of maida, rice flour and a pinch of turmeric. Turmeric gives the yellow hue to this snack. The balls are deep fried in oil, preferably coconut oil.
