= Ada (food) =

Regional traditional Indian sweet

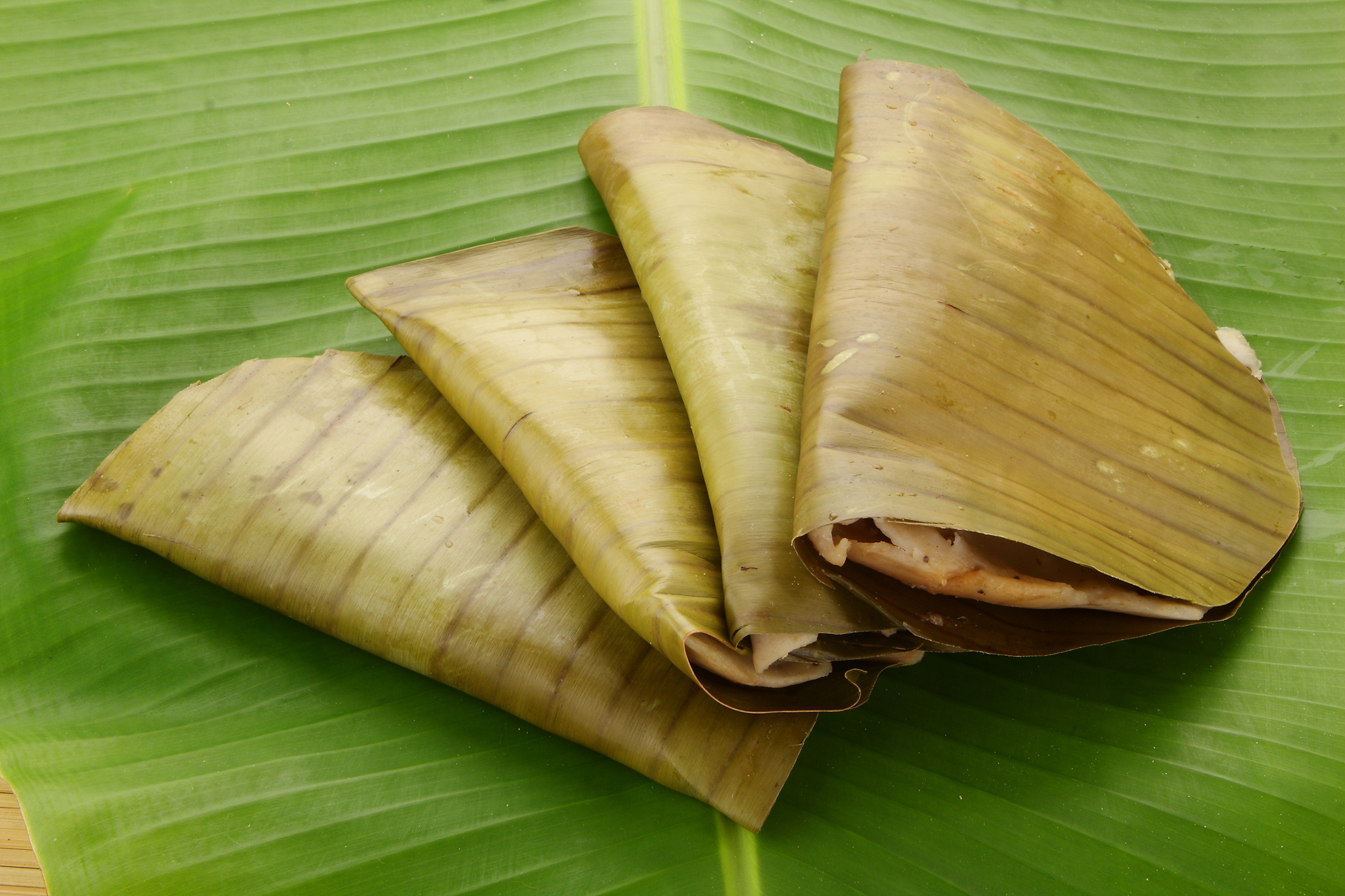
- Ada in banana leaf
- Alternative names: Ela ada
- Place of origin: India
- Region or state: Kerala
- Main ingredients: Rice flour, sugar or jaggery, grated coconut

Ada, ela ada, patholi, genasele, or yelaiyappam is an Indian sweet traditionally served in Kerala, Karnataka, Konkan, and parts of Tamil Nadu. It consists of rice parcels encased in a dough made of rice flour, with sweet fillings, steamed in a banana leaf, and served as an evening snack or as part of breakfast. It is made of raw rice flour, sugar or jaggery, and grated coconut. It is usually prepared on Onam.

Poovada is prepared in the tip end of the plantain leaf as the Nivedyam for Onam, into this ada goes, with the coconut filling, a sprinkling of the Thumbapoo (a white flower Leucas aspera), making it more auspicious. Sometimes banana is also added in the filing which is coconut-jaggery-banana filling. Spicy ottada is a unique breakfast with maida and rice flour as the main ingredients. It can be also made with rice flour alone, and not steamed but cooked on a tava or flame. Sometimes the fillings inside ada would be chakkavaratti (jackfruit jam). Ada is also given as prasadam (sacred food) to devotees at temples in Kerala.

== See also ==
- List of dumplings
- Tamale
