= Karadikali =

Folk dance performed in Kerala

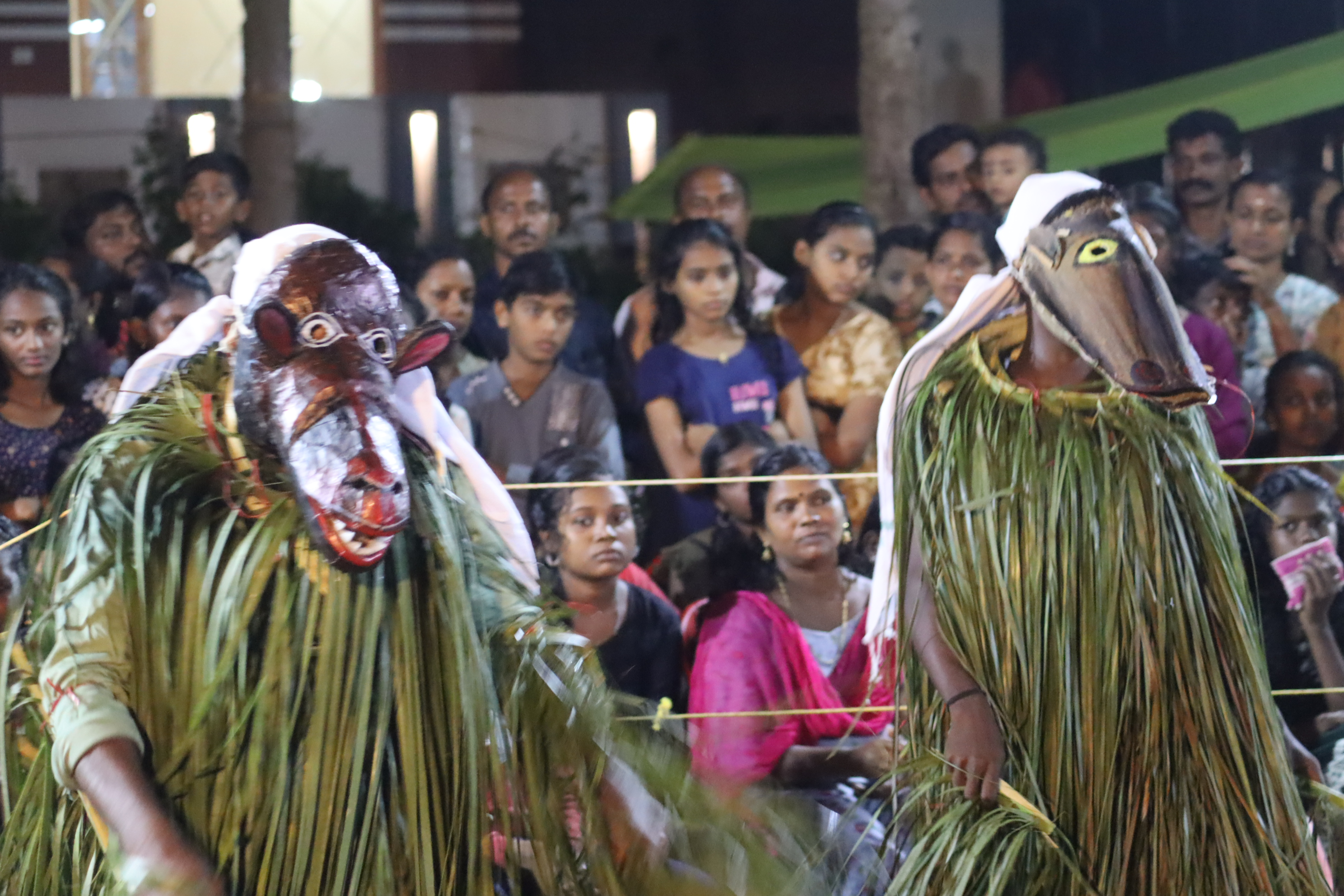
Karadikali

Karadikali (Malayalam: കരടികളി, lit. 'dance of the bears'), also written as Karadi kali, is a folk art form performed in regions of Kerala (including Kollam and Kayamkulam) during the Onam festival. It is performed in the courtyards of houses on the evening of Onam. It is a counterpart of Pulikali (the 'dance of the tigers').

Karadikali performance in 2024

== Performance ==
The main characters are the bear and the hunters. A young man is dressed in a lightweight wooden mask made of banana leaves and bamboo tied to his head. He is also painted black and covered with coconut palm leaves. The hunters come dressed in the guise of a 'Sayippu', wearing socks, a hat, and a gun made of wood. A group of singers and drummers accompany the bear and the hunter. Folk instruments such as kaimani, kanjira, and cymbals are played in the background.

First, the bear steps to the rhythm. In some places, the bear plays with a mask made of areca leaves. Then the song begins. In 'Karadikali', the performers dress up to get the appearance of a bear to dance to the tune of 'Karadippattu'. Finally he "shoots" the bear down using a bow and arrow marking the end of the performance. The bear visits all the houses in the locality and "dies" at every courtyard after the hunter shoots it.
