= Maladera onam =

Scientific classification
- Kingdom: Animalia
- Phylum: Arthropoda
- Class: Insecta
- Order: Coleoptera
- Suborder: Polyphaga
- Infraorder: Scarabaeiformia
- Family: Scarabaeidae
- Genus: Maladera
- Species: M. onam

Binomial name
- Maladera onam Gupta, Bhunia, Ahrens & Chandra, 2025

Species of beetle

Maladera onam is a species of beetle of the family Scarabaeidae. It is found in India (Kerala).

== Description ==
Adults reach a length of about 9.5 mm. They have an uniformly dark reddish brown, oval body. The dorsal and ventral surface are dull and nearly glabrous, except for the lateral setae of the elytra and pronotum.

== Etymology ==
The species is named after a famous festival in Kerala.
