= Bhagaban Sahu =

Odia folk dance teacher, actor, singer

- Born: 21 September 1914; India
- Died: 12 August 2002 (aged 87)
- Occupations: Dancer; Choreographer
- Known for: Folk dancing
- Awards: Padma Shri

Bhagaban Sahu (1914-2002) was an Indian folk dancer, teacher and choreographer, known for codifying the folk dance forms of Odisha.

He was born on 21 September 1914 at Ganjam in Bihar and Orissa Province of British India in a Brahmin family and took to folk dancing. He was credited with efforts to revive the traditional Odissi dance forms such as Bagha Nacha (Tiger dance), Stilt dance, Jodi sankha, Laudi, Paika dance and Chadheia chadheiani. He taught the villagers about these dance forms and trained them on the art. He was the choreographer of the popular tiger dance sequence in the 1989 Bengali movie, Bagh Bahadur, directed by Buddhadev Dasgupta.

The Government of India awarded him the fourth highest civilian honour of the Padma Shri in 1992. Sahu's life has been documented in a biography, Folk Legend Baghaban Sahu, written by Sujata Patnaik, and published by the Ministry of Information and Broadcasting. He died on 12 August 2002, a month before turning 88.

== See also ==
- Bagha Nacha
