= Onapottan =

Folk character, traditional art form from Kerala

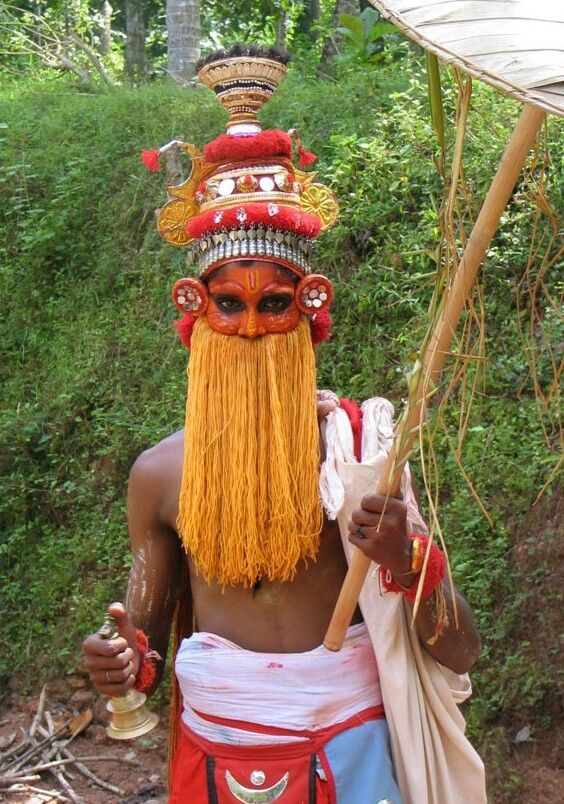
Onapottan wearing costume and props

Onapottan (Onesvaran) is a folk character that appears during the Onam season in North Malabar region of Kerala. The Onapottan visits the houses during the Utradam and Thiruvonam days of Onam. The role of Onapottan is enacted by an artist. The name Onapottan is given to this character because he does not speak (pottan = deaf in Malayalam language). His arrival is announced by the ringing of the traditional 'hand bell'. He wears elaborate props including the heavy crown, palm leaf umbrella, bangles and face paint. He is supposed to bring prosperity to the houses he visits by giving blessings. Onapottan is not a common sight now, and is popular only in villages. In some parts of Kerala, the right to enact Onapottan is restricted to members of Malaya community.
