= Pulikali =

Recreational folk art from the state of Kerala

Pulikali പുലിക്കളി
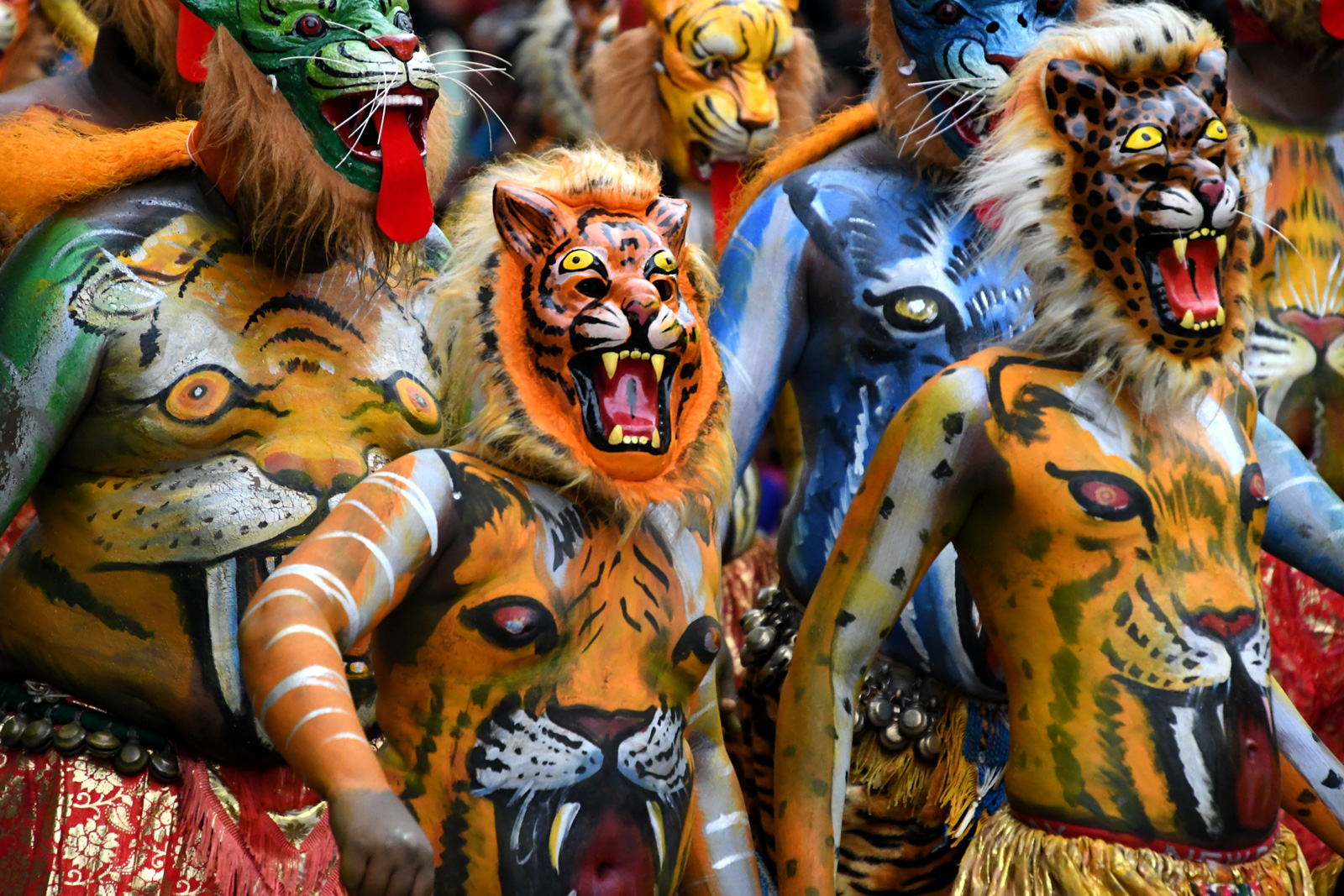
- Dates: 4th Onam day (Vishakham) in the month of Chingam
- Frequency: Annually
- Venue: Swaraj Round, Thrissur
- Country: India
- Founded: 1886; 140 years ago
- Founder: Sakthan Thampuran

Pulikali (Malayalam: പുലിക്കളി, lit. 'dance of the tiger') is a recreational folk art from the state of Keralam, India, performed during Onam, an annual harvest festival. The performance revolves around the theme of tiger hunting.

On the fourth day of Onam celebrations (Naalaam Onam or chathayam), performers painted like tigers and leopards in bright yellow, red, and black shake their bellies and dance to the beats of instruments like the chenda and chengila. In Thrissur, on the fourth day of Onam, Pulikali troupes from across the district gather to display their skills, attracting thousands of people to the city. Pulikali is also performed during various other festive seasons.

== History ==
Pulikali dates back more than 200 years, to when Rama Varma Sakthan Thampuran, then the Maharaja of Cochin, is said to have introduced the folk art. The art form, then known as 'Pulikkettikali', was performed by dancers decked out as tigers, using peculiar steps that resembled a tiger's movements, and was greatly enjoyed by the locals. Pulikali in Thrissur is held in memory of this event.

== Modern ==
Over the years, there have been changes in the adornment of Pulikali dancers. In the early days, masks were not used, and participants had their whole bodies painted, including their faces. Today, participants wear ready-made masks, artificial teeth, tongues, beards, and mustaches in addition to body paint. The tigers also wear a broad belt with small bells around their waists. This festival in Thrissur has become a highly popular community event, attracting strong participation from local youth and robust support from sponsors. The event is organized by the Pulikali Coordination Committee, a unified council of Pulikali groups formed in Thrissur in 2004 to preserve and promote the art form.. The Thrissur Municipal Corporation gives each Pulikali troupe a grant of ₹30,000 (US$400)..

Pulikali - പുലിക്കളി

The art form is usually performed by men and children. In 2016, for the first time, three women, as part of a 51-member troupe, took part in the Pulikali in Thrissur.

Owing to the COVID-19 pandemic and lockdown restrictions, many Onam celebrations were postponed. At the initiative of the Ayyanthole Desham Pulikali Samithy, Pulikali was live-streamed on the group's Facebook page. About 17 people took part in the dance virtually from various locations.

== Preparations ==
A striking feature of this folk art is the colourful appearance of the performers. A particular combination of tempera powder and varnish or enamel is used to make the paint. First, the dancers remove their body hair, and then the base coat of paint is applied. This coat takes two to three hours to dry. A second coat is then applied with a more elaborate design. The entire process takes five to seven hours. Many artists gather to paint the tigers. The process is meticulous and often begins in the early hours of the morning. By afternoon, the Pulikali groups, known as 'sangams', from all four corners of Thrissur move in procession through the streets, dancing, bouncing, and shaking their bellies to the beat of the drums. They travel along Palace Road, Karunakaran Nambiar Road, Shornur Road, A. R. Menon Road, and MG Road to the Swaraj Round, Thrissur, in the heart of the city.

Along the way, scenes such as a tiger preying on an animal and a tiger being hunted by a hunter are enacted. Thousands of spectators line the streets, enjoying the dance and cheering on the dancers, and some even try to join in. The groups assemble at Naduvilal on the Swaraj Round, Thrissur, in front of the Vadakkunnathan Temple, and each offers a coconut to the deity of the Ganapati shrine there (Naduvilal Ganapati Kovil) before processing around the ground. The procession also includes floats from each village. The troupes compete to create the best floats and the best-dressed tigers.

== Gallery ==
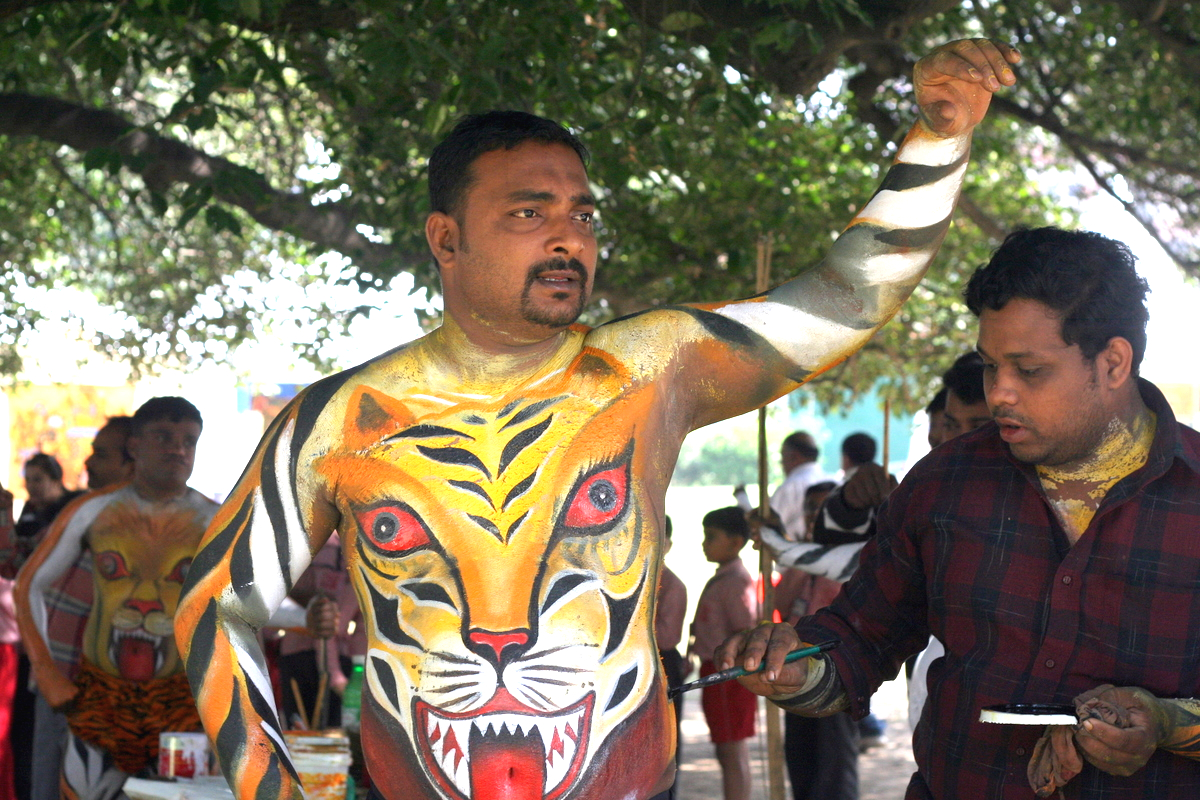
Pulikali artist

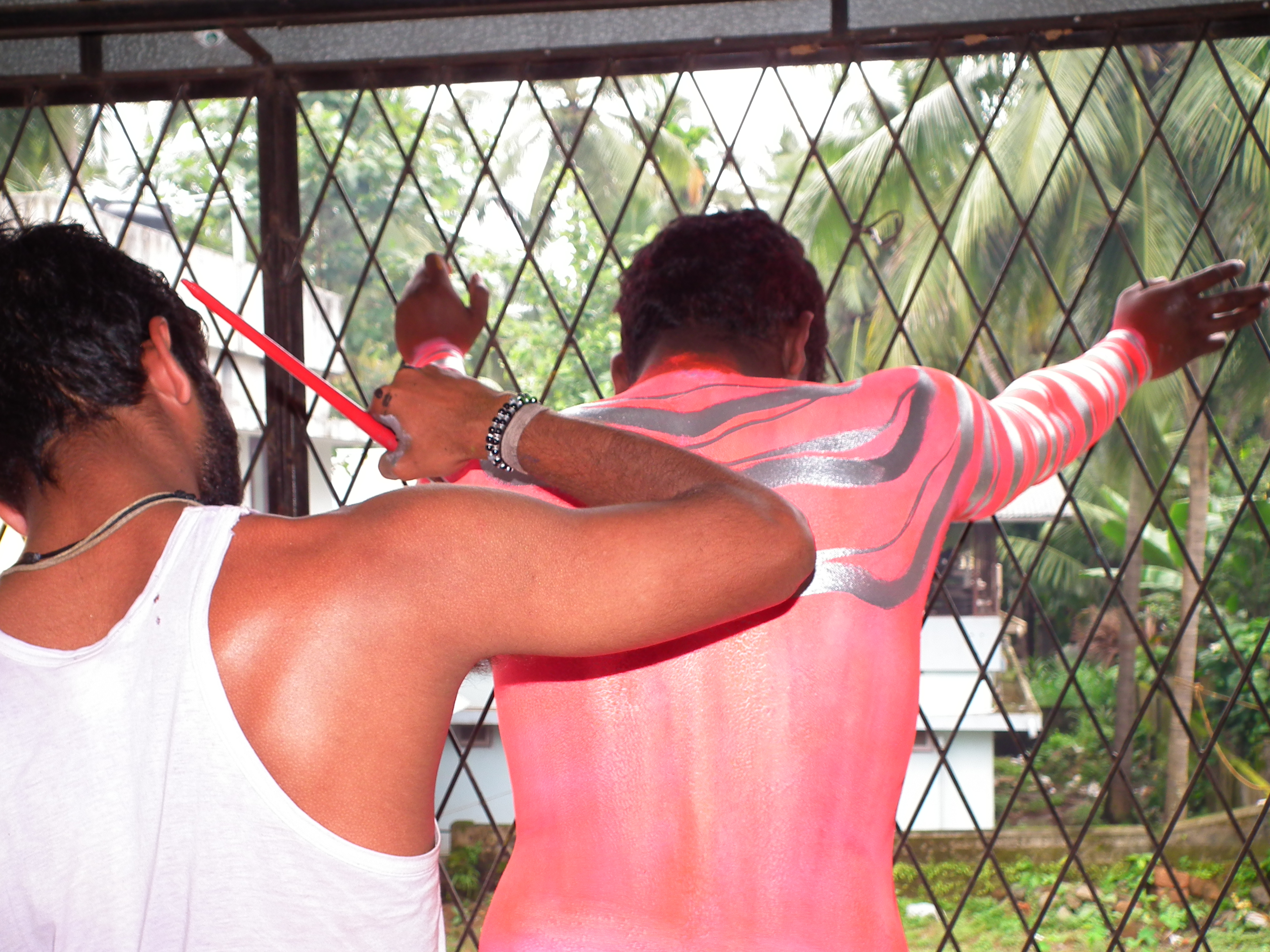
Artist painting tiger stripes on the back

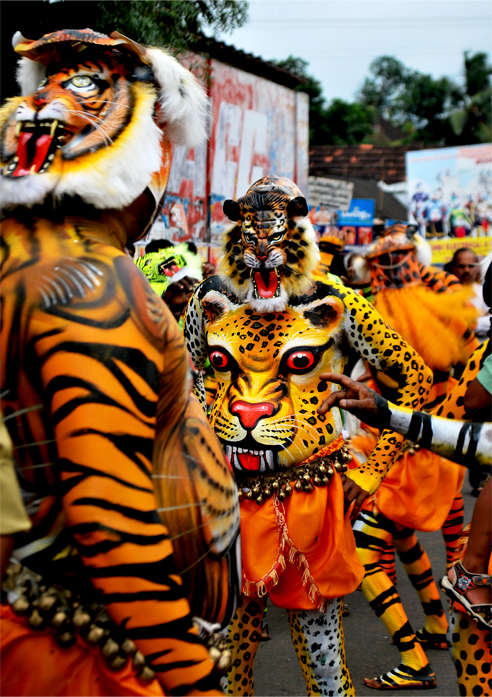
Pulikali 2010

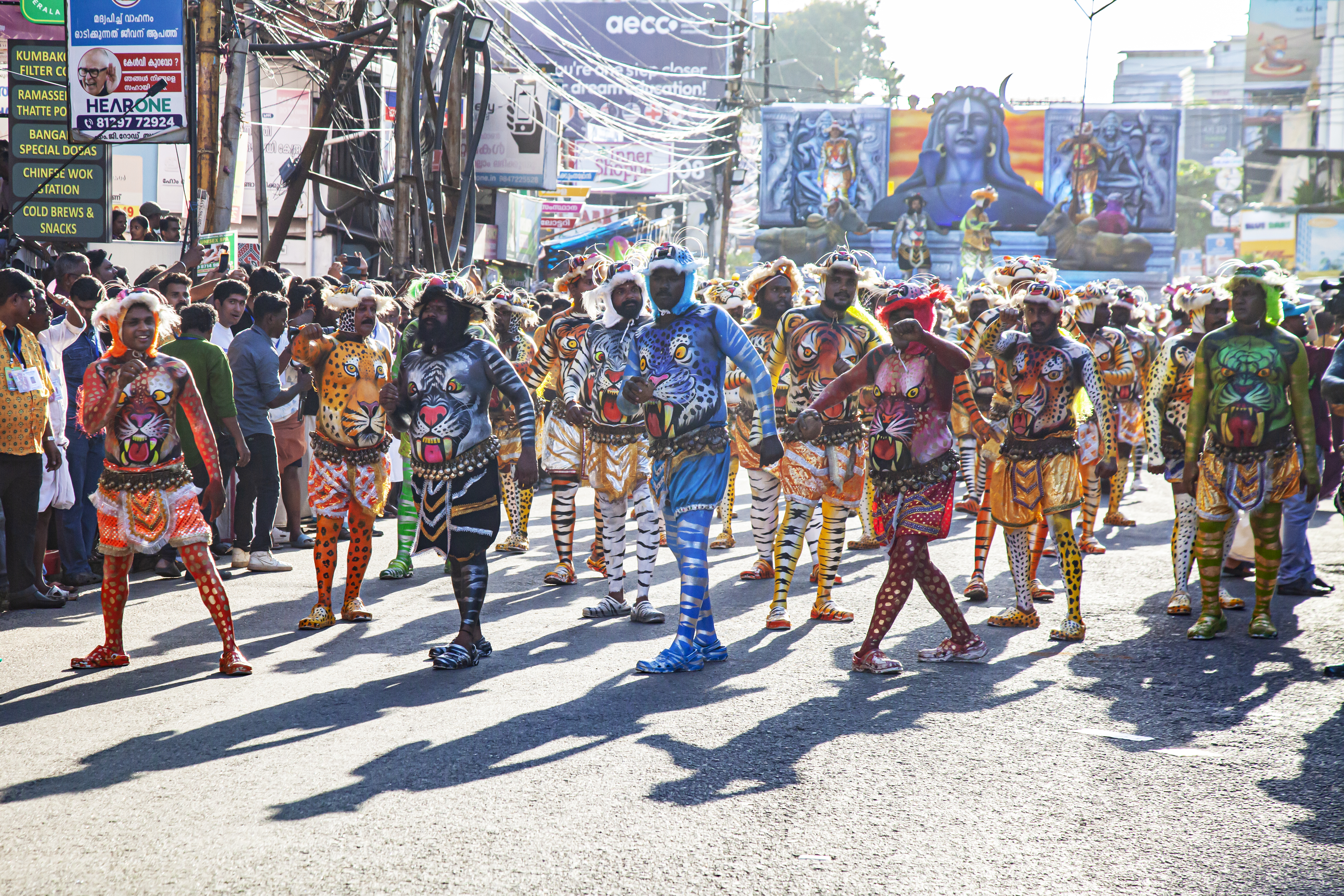
Photowalk during Pulikali in Thrissur, 2024

== See also ==
- Bagha Nacha, tiger dance from Odisha
- Hulivesha
- Onam
- Thrissur
- Kerala
