= Bagha Nacha =

Tiger folk dance from Odisha, India

Bagha Nacha or Tiger Dance is performed in Binka, Sonepur of Subarnapur district and Behrampur, and in some parts of the Ganjam district in Odisha, India. It is performed in the month of chaitra. Male dancers paint themselves like a tiger and perform the bagha nacha.

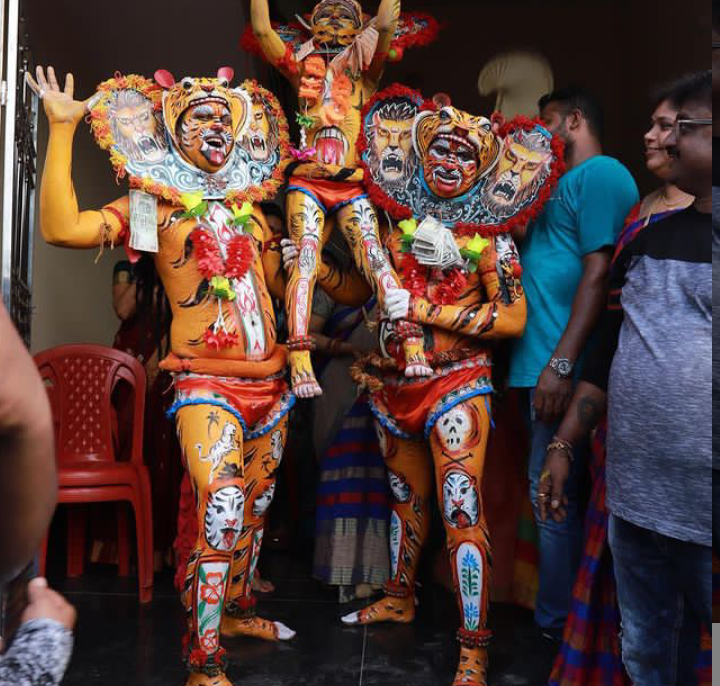
The male dancer paints himself like a tiger. Thus, it is called Bagha Nacha or Tiger Dance.

== Performance ==
Dancers spend about three to four hours getting painted in bagha vesh (attire of the tiger) and it takes at least two people per dancer to get the painting right. The bagha nacha dancers need not be a professional dancer. Interested performers undergo two to four weeks of training under a mentor before the actual performance.

The bagha nacha performance has a permanent place in the state's Thakurani Jatra where the dance is performed as a homage to the goddess of wisdom. The dance is performed to appease the goddess Maa Budhi Thakurani and receive her blessings.

Four changus, which is a traditional musical instrument, are required. The instruments need constant warming, which is why a vehicle filled with haystacks follows the bagha nacha performers. Garlands made of katha champa flowers are put on the performers to keep them cool through the intense performances. Each performer is accompanied with four to six dhampa drum beaters, with periodic breaks, to keep the momentum going.

A similar bagha nacha dance form exists in the states of West Bengal and Andhra Pradesh, but the form of performance is unique in each. The dhampa drumbeats and costumes do not resemble any classical dance form.

In January 2025, a cohort of more than 40 male dancers participated in the Jayati Jai Mamah Bharatam dance ensemble organised by the Ministry of Culture during the Republic Day parade. The dancers, dressed as tigers, performed to the tunes of mohuri and nishan.

== Films ==
In 1989, bagha nacha from Ganjam was captured on-screen by director Buddhadev Dasgupta in the Bengali film, Bagh Bahadur. The film won the Best National Film Award the same year.

In January 2025, an Odia film about the struggle of a father and daughter to preserve the tradition and legacy of bagha nacha hit the theatres. The title of the film is Rangashoor and it is directed by Pratap Rout.

== See also ==
- Pulikali, tiger dance from Keralam
