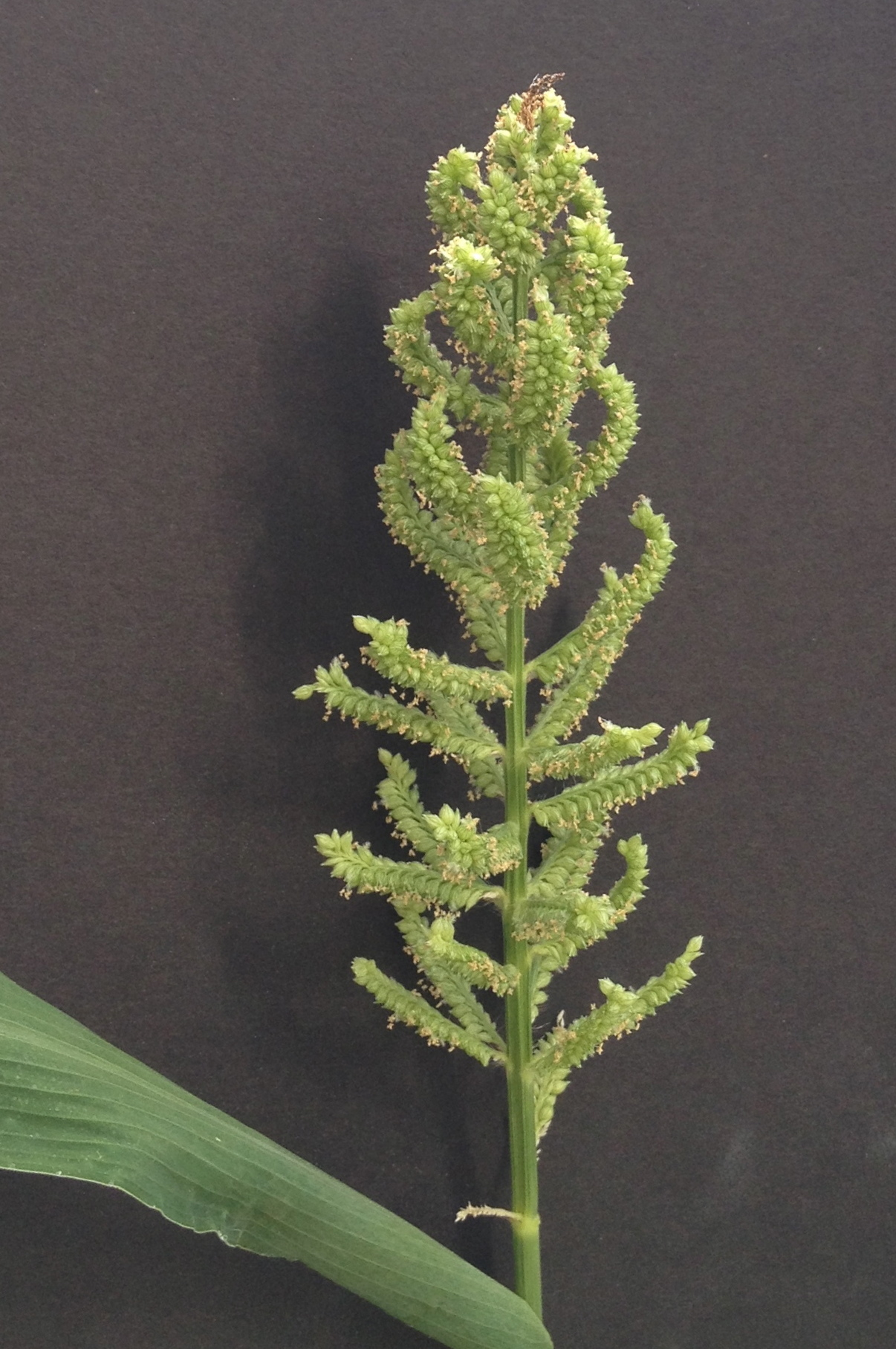

Scientific classification
- Kingdom: Plantae
- Clade: Tracheophytes
- Clade: Angiosperms
- Clade: Monocots
- Clade: Commelinids
- Order: Poales
- Family: Poaceae
- Subfamily: Panicoideae
- Genus: Echinochloa
- Species: E. frumentacea

Binomial name
- Echinochloa frumentacea Link

Synonyms
- Echinochloa colona var. frumentacea (Link) Ridl.; Echinochloa crus-galli var. edulis Hitchc. nom. illeg.; Echinochloa crus-galli var. edulis Honda; Echinochloa crus-galli var. frumentacea (Link) W.F.Wright; Echinochloa crusgalli var. frumentacea W. Wight; Echinochloa glabrescens var. barbata Kossenko; Oplismenus frumentaceus (Link) Kunth; Panicum crus-galli var. edule (Hitchc.) Thell. ex de Lesd.; Panicum crus-galli var. edulis (Hitchc.) Makino & Nemoto; Panicum crus-galli var. frumentacea (Link) Trimen; Panicum crus-galli var. frumentaceum (Roxb.) Trimen; Panicum frumentaceum Roxb. nom. illeg.

= Echinochloa frumentacea =

Species of grass

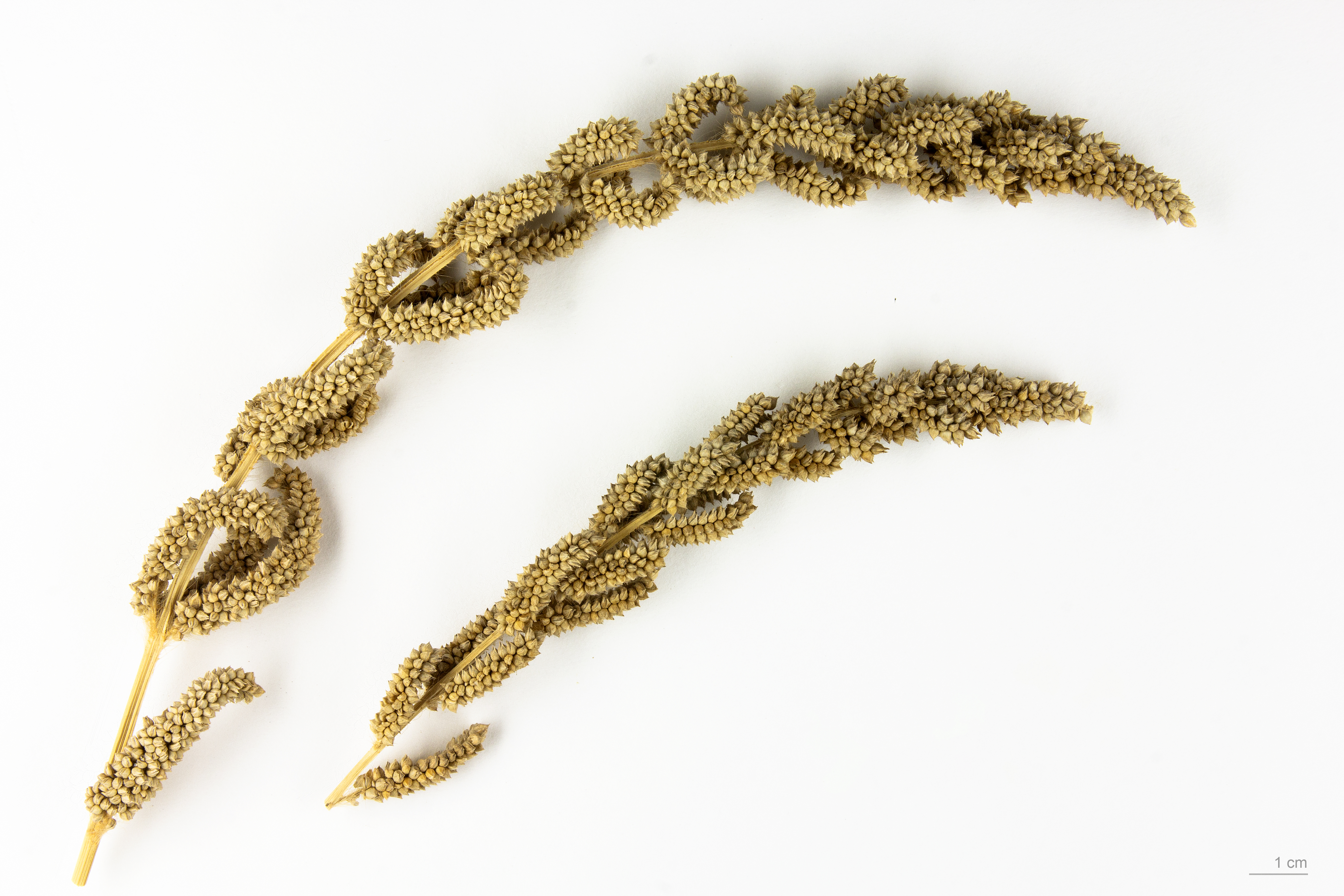
Echinochloa frumentacea (MHNT)

Echinochloa frumentacea (Indian barnyard millet, sawa millet, or billion dollar grass) is a species of Echinochloa. Both Echinochloa frumentacea and E. esculenta are called Japanese millet. This millet is widely grown as a cereal in India, Pakistan, and Nepal. Its wild ancestor is the tropical grass Echinochloa colona, but the exact date or region of domestication is uncertain. It is cultivated on marginal lands where rice and other crops will not grow well. The grains are cooked in water, like rice, or boiled with milk and sugar. Sometimes it is fermented to make beer. While also being part of the staple diet for some communities in India, these seeds are, in particular, (cooked and) eaten during religious fasting (willingly abstaining from some types of food / food ingredients). For this reason, these seeds are commonly also referred to as "vrat ke chawal" in Hindi (i.e., "rice for fasting", literally). Also, in India, the barnyard millet is known as Sama ke chawal/ Samak chawal/ Sama rice/ Samak rice. Other common names to identify these seeds include oodalu (ಊದಲು) in Kannada, Shyamak (শ্যামাক) or Shyama Chal (শ্যামা চাল) in Bangla, jhangora in the Garhwal Hills, bhagar (भगर) in Marathi-speaking areas, samo or morio (mario, moraiaya) seeds in Gujarati, bonthasaamalu (బొంతసామలు) in Telugu, and kuthiraivaali (குதிரைவாளி) in Tamil.

== Pests ==
Insect pests include:

Root feeders

- white grubs Holotrichia sp., Anomala dimidiata, and Apogonia sp. (in India)

Seedling feeders

- shoot fly Atherigona falcata
- Atherigona pulla, Atherigona simplex, Atherigona soccata, Atherigona oryzae, and Atherigona nudiseta
- armyworm Mythimna separata
- thrips Haplothrips ganglbaueri
- stem borers Sesamia inferens, Chilo partellus, and Chilo diffusilineus

Sucking pests

- leafhoppers Nephotettix cincticeps, Sogatella furcifera, and Sogatella kolophon
- plant hoppers Nilaparvata lugens and Peregrinus maidis
- leaf bug Cletus punctiger
- aphids Hysteroneura setariae and Macrosiphum eleusines

Leaf feeders

- grasshoppers Acrida exaltata, Atractomorpha crenulata, Hieroglyphus banian, Hieroglyphus daganensis, Hieroglyphus nigrorepletus, Oxya nitidula and Oxya bidentata
- leaf caterpillar Euproctis similis

Developing grain pests

- bugs Agonoscelis pubescens, Dolycoris indicus, and Nezara viridula

== See also ==
- Echinochloa esculenta, also called Japanese barnyard millet
