= Panicum frumentaceum =

Panicum frumentaceum can refer to:

- Panicum frumentaceum Roxb., a synonym of Echinochloa frumentacea
- Panicum frumentaceum Salisb., a synonym of Sorghum bicolor
