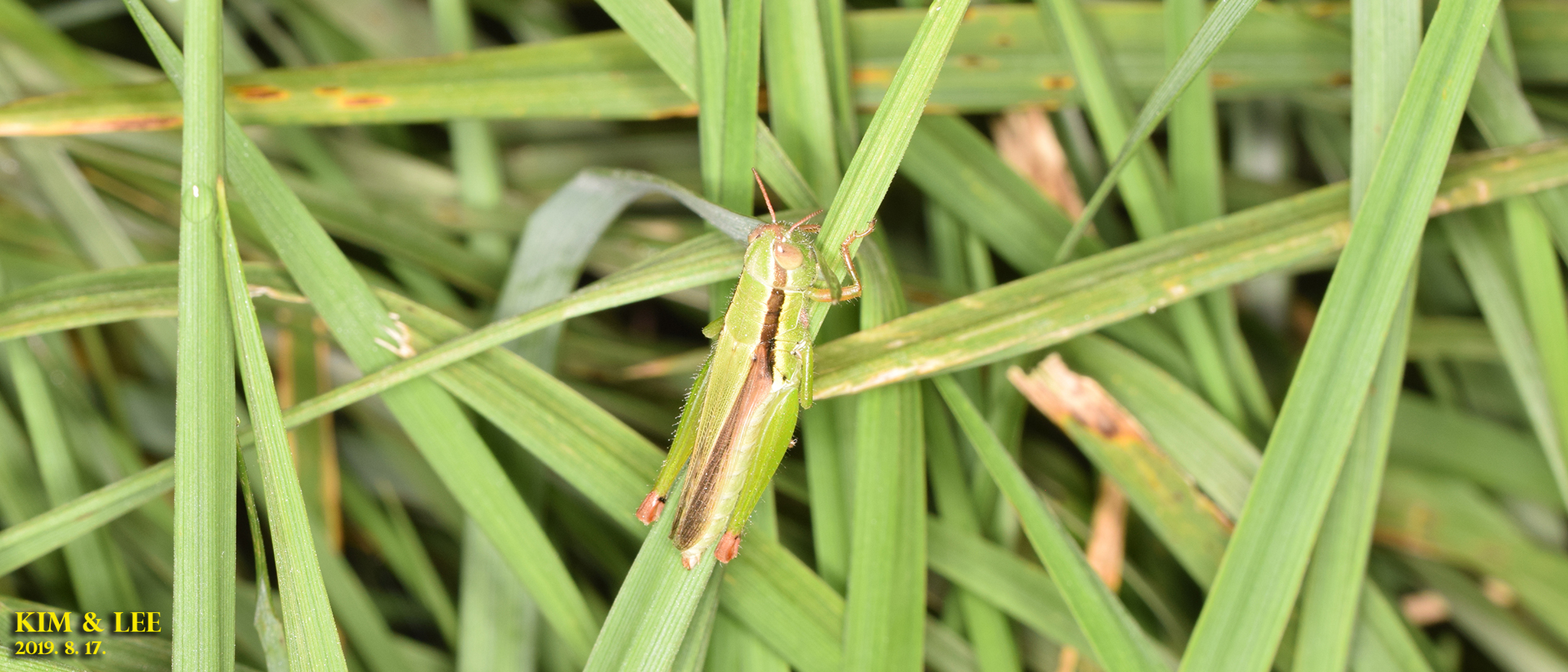
- Oxya sinuosa, South Korea

Scientific classification
- Domain: Eukaryota
- Kingdom: Animalia
- Phylum: Arthropoda
- Class: Insecta
- Order: Orthoptera
- Suborder: Caelifera
- Family: Acrididae
- Subfamily: Oxyinae
- Tribe: Oxyini
- Genus: Oxya
- Species: O. sinuosa

Binomial name
- Oxya sinuosa Mistshenko, 1951

= Oxya sinuosa =

Species of short-horned grasshopper

Oxya sinuosa is a species of short-horned grasshopper in the family Acrididae. It is found in eastern Asia.
