= Napin =

Seed storage protein found in the family Brassicaceae

Napin-1A
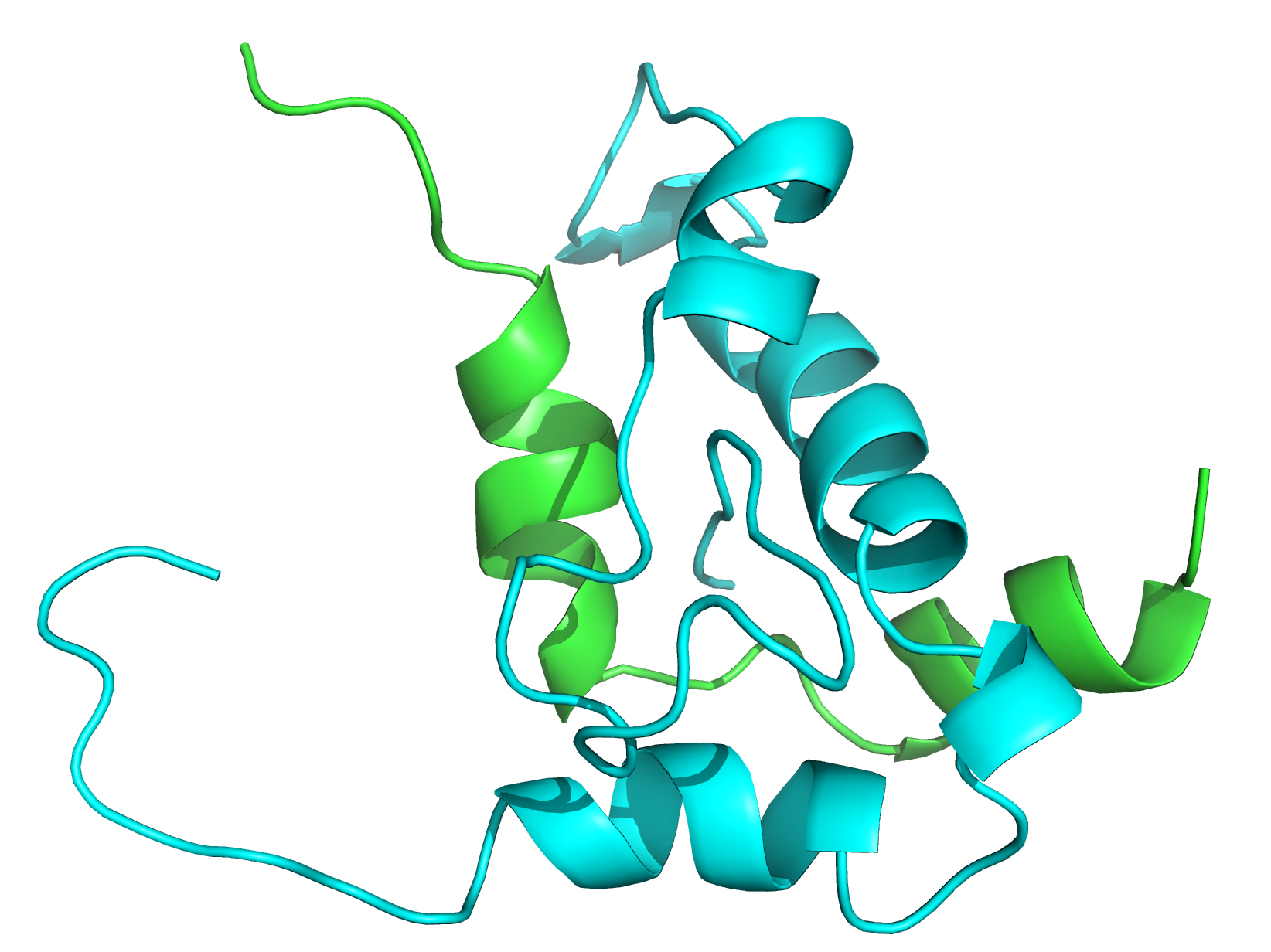
- Napin from B. napus. Larger C-terminus polypeptide chain is shown in cyan and the shorter N-terminus polypeptide chain is shown in green. Adapted from PDB: 1PNB

Identifiers
- Organism: Brassica napus
- Symbol: ?
- Orthologs: OMA: entry
- PDB: 1PNB
- UniProt: P24565
Search for
- Structures: Swiss-model
- Domains: InterPro

Napin is one of the two most abundant seed storage proteins in the seeds of the Brassicaceae Family (Brassica napus L., B. juncea L. Czern., B. nigra L. W.D.J.Koch, B. rapa L., E. Sativa and Sinapis alba L.). Napins are present in a wide variety of Brassicaceae plant systems, such as leaves, seeds, roots, and stems. They are water soluble low-molecular weight basic proteins related to the prolamin superfamily and are classified as 2S or 1.7S proteins. Napins represent 20–40% of a seed's total seed protein, depending on the specific species, and are typically synthesized within embryos during seed development. This expression of Napin appears to be highly regulated as its synthesis is confined to the embryonal and axis cells and occurs only during a limited time of seed development. Following the end of seed development, Napins are rapidly degraded by the seed into nitrogen and carbon sources for synthesis of new molecules needed for growth in the now germinating seedling. Napins have a total molecular weight in the range of 12–17 kDa, though this number varies depending on the specific species Their isoelectric point varies based on the method of extraction and the specific characteristics of the isoforms that exist. Napins are composed of two polypeptide chains roughly ~14 kDa in weight—a ~4.5 kDa smaller polypeptide chain and a large ~10 kDa polypeptide chain, stabilized primarily by disulphide bonds. Their secondary structure shows a high α-helical content.

== Structure ==
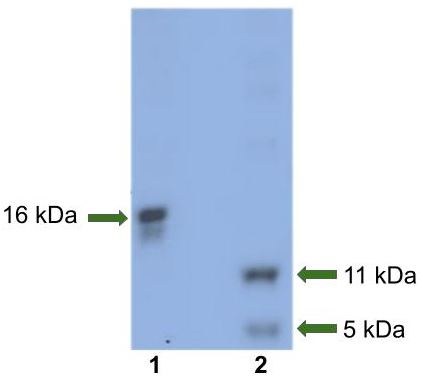
SDS-PAGE of Napin from E. sativa showing the Napin protein (lane 1) and its two fragments (lane 2). Changes were made to the original Image. https://creativecommons.org/licenses/by/4.0/</ref>

As a basic protein, Napin can be used to bind together and determine the shape, properties, and be able to synthesize when seeds develop. Napins are heterodimers that are composed of two polypeptide chains—a large chain, roughly ~10 kDa, and a shorter chain, roughly 4.5 kDa. These two chains are connected by two inter-linking covalent disulfide linkages that act as anchors that keep the two polypeptide strands together. These two disulfide bond linkages are formed under reducing conditions and connect the short and long chains that are formed between the cysteines: Cys10-Cys25' and Cys23-Cys14' or Cys15'. Further aiding in the connection of the larger and shorter chains, there are two disulfide bonds between the cysteines: Cys27-Cys10' and Cys14'(Cys15')-Cys72, respectively that allow the C-terminus of the long chain to come into close proximity with the N-terminus of the shorter chain. Napin is further characterized as a globular motif composed of four α-helices, with a top-down topography for the structure where the first helix is not split into two parts According to analysis carried out, the short chain of Napin is divided into two α-helices that are joined together by a 2-4 residue strand. This resulting fragment then bends to accommodate the bundle formed by Helices 3 and 4 and runs almost orthologically to the helix-3 and helix-4 bundle The short loop between helix-3 and helix-4 is rich in glutamine residues, and that there is a longer loop after helix-4 that lacks any apparent secondary structure and folds over itself. Barciszewski et al. provides more insight on helical position and state that " α-helix-2 of the large subunit runs antiparallel to the α-helix 1 and 1' in the small subunit followed by a short loop and α-helix-3 serving as the protein backbone, since it joins the N-terminius and the C-termini of the polypeptides forming small and large subunits with disulfide bridges, respectively". For α-helix-1, there are disulfide linkages present that join α-helix-1 with the middle portion of α-helix-2 via the Cys18 and Cys14 respectively, as well as residues Cys15 and Cys62 in the longer chain. Previous studies have suggested that Napin is composed of 40–45% helices and 16–20% β-sheets, 25% α-helix and 38% β-sheets for napin, indicating that Napin consists of a high percentage of α-helices. This high α-helical content is reported to contribute to Napin's antifungal nature.

== Composition ==
Napins are typically synthesized as a single larger precursor molecule of 178 residues, which contain a post-translational N-terminal signal peptide and a C-terminal precursor peptide. This initial precursor molecule is translated and formed by membrane-bound ribosomes. This synthesized precursor polypetide contains a 21- amino-acid-long sequence rich in hydrophobic residues, which are characteristics of signals belonging to secretory proteins. Immediately tailing the signal sequence there is a string of negatively charged amino acids without glutamine residues. Prior to translation, the signal sequence is removed prior to formation of the precursor Napin. After formation by the membrane-bound ribosomes, the precursor Napin is then transported via the Golgi Apparatus and is taken to the vacuole, where the protein bodies are formed. It is within these vacuoles that the rest of the precursor modification and processing steps are carried out. In order to form a mature Napin, the precursor Napin is proteolytically cleaved, with the loss of a linker peptide and short peptides from both the N and C terminals before transfer of the protein to the endoplasmic reticulum. For the cleavage, the precursor polytpeptide is first processed by endoproteases, then by aminopeptidases, followed bycarboxypeptidases. In total, four cleavage sites were identified, with 3 cleavage sites being located in the short subunit, and one cleavage site in the larger subunit. Among these modification, three short peptides are removed. These proteolytic cleavage events ultimately result in the formation of two mature Napin chains of around 86 and 29 residues which form the long and short chains respectively. In terms of molecular weights, napin polypeptide chains are made up of 9,900 and 4,000 amino acids held together by disulfide bonds . Amion acid sequence analysis indicated that roughly 35% of the napin precursor is not included in the mature polypeptide. The amino acid sequence of napin cDNA clones and napin peptide fragments indicate napin starts as a 178-residue precursor. During its precursor phase, the charged amino acids present on the Napin are not evenly distributed, with 12 out of the 16 negatively charged residues eventually being removed during the maturation process. This uneven distribution gives the Napin precursor a lower pI of roughly 7. Only when these negatively charged residues are removed during the maturation process does the increase, giving mature. Napin a higher pI of 11.

== Properties ==
Napin is water soluble and soluble in a wide pH range. Napins contains many hydrophobic residues, 45% of which are located on one side, giving it some interactions with oil and water. Arginine, lysine, and cysteine present in napins make them excellent antibacterials, and since it is a basic protein, it can change its acidity to make it more effective. Some in silico and in vitro antimicrobial activity screening reported napins as antimicrobial, and antifungal peptides. These anti-fungal and anti-microbial properties are attributed to the permabealization of fungal or bacterial membrane that is induced by Napin, which ultimately leads to cell damage to the fungi/bacteria. One study in particular observed antifungal activity against Fusarium graminearum, making it a promising option for future biocontrol research Other similar studies reported pumpkin 2S albumin as inhibitng the growth of Phanerochaete chrysosporium, Aspergillus flavus, and Fusarium oxysporum, and Napin (PR protein-13) from Pennisteum glaucum inhibiting the growth of Sclerospora graminicola spores. Apart from showing promise as an agricultural biocontrol agent, Napins also exhibit cytotoxicity and potential as anti-cancer proteins for use in possible future anti-cancer treatments. Studies have shown that Napin from E. sativa, at concentrations of 25 and 50 μM, showed extensive killing of cancerous cells as well as cytotoxicity against Huh7 cells. Adding to this, another study showed a similar Napin, pumpkin 2s albumin, exhibiting cytotoxicity against several cancerous cells such as the ovarian teratocarcinoma cell line PA-1, prostate cancer cell line PC-3, DU-145 and liver hepatocellular carcinoma (Hep G2), and the breast cancer cell line MCF-7 Aside from its anti-cancer nature, Napin also has some interesting interactions. During a study, Napin was reported to be a trypsin inhibitor. Additionally, the large and small subunits are both calmodulin antagonists as well as substrates for calcium dependent protein kinases in plants.

== Napin Gene ==
Napin genes are highly regulates, and are only expressed in certain periods of time exclusive to the seed development phase. Because of this exclusivity to the seed development phase, Napin gene expression is typically considered to be the earliest known marker for embryogenesis. Like many other proteins, Napins are encoded by a multigene family, with the total number of Napin genes ranging from 10 to 16 genes, depending on the species. Despite this moderate number of Napin genes, only a few have been successfully isolated and characterized. Only a total of four genetic sequences, BngNAP1, gNa, napB, and napA, as well as three cDNA sequences, pNAP1, pN2, and pN1 have been published. Napin genes have no introns and contain original RNA polymerase II genes. In a study, Napin mRNA from the zygotic embryo was initially detected at the late heart stage roughly around 18 days after pollination. Following this period of time, Napin starts to appear about 2 days later. Accumulation of the Napin protein reaches its peak during the cell expansion phase, immediately following the formation of tissues and organs. This peaking phase occurs 25 days after pollination and continues until about 20 days . When it comes to gene expression of Napin, upstream sequence elements are important. A deletion analysis of some Napin genes conducted by Josefsson et al., provided some information, detailing just how important these upstream elements are for seed-specific expression. Another study has shown that a 300bp upstream sequence of a Napin gene is enough for expression that is embryo-specific and regulated and that conserved elements are able to link with nuclear proteins. Another deletion analysis conducted at a later rate revealed that in the Napin napA promoter, the region between -309 and -152 had a large effect on transcription and enhancer activity in both the embryo and the endosperm. In a study, the region-152 to -132 of the Napin gene was found to contain overlapping sequence motifs that are similar to the enhancer box (E-box), ABA-responsive element (ABRE), ESBF-II and opaque2. Deletion of bp -152 to -144 was found to completely abolish expression of the Napin gene, pointing to the enhancer box and ABRE-like sequences are crucial for promoter activation.

== Function ==
Seed storage proteins, including napin, act as sources of nitrogen, sulfur, and carbon, usually during the early stages of the developing seed. Beyond storage, napins may also have a defensive function during seed growth. It has been shown that many napin isoforms from Brassiceae species inhibit the growth of pathogenic fungi. Napin is expressed as a response to general wounding, or the presence of exogenous abscisic acid, which is produced during stresses such as tissue damage or water stress.

== See also ==
Cruciferin
