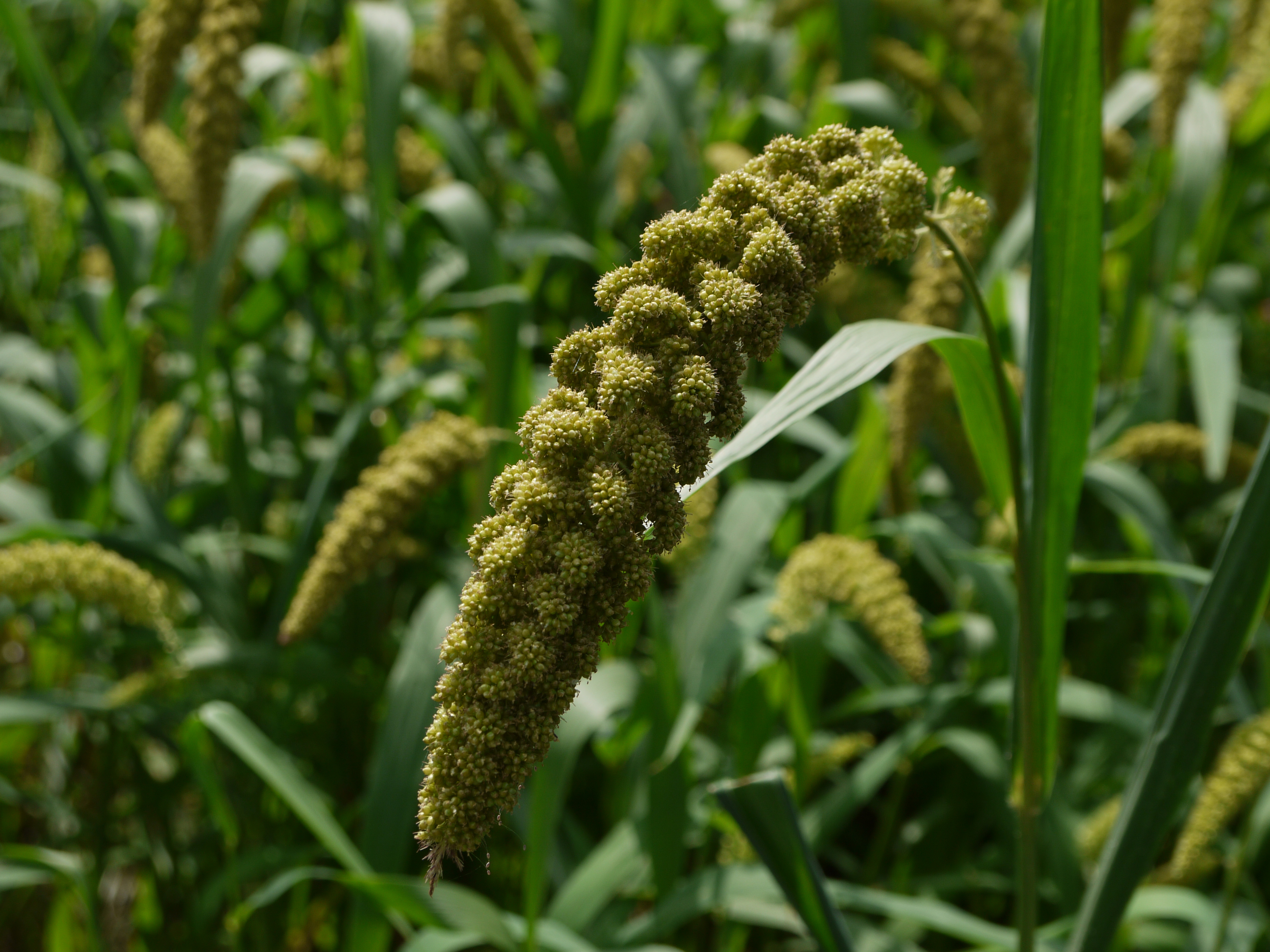
- Immature seedhead

Scientific classification
- Kingdom: Plantae
- Clade: Tracheophytes
- Clade: Angiosperms
- Clade: Monocots
- Clade: Commelinids
- Order: Poales
- Family: Poaceae
- Subfamily: Panicoideae
- Genus: Setaria
- Species: S. italica

Binomial name
- Setaria italica (L.) P. Beauvois

Synonyms
- See § Synonyms

= Foxtail millet =

Species of grass

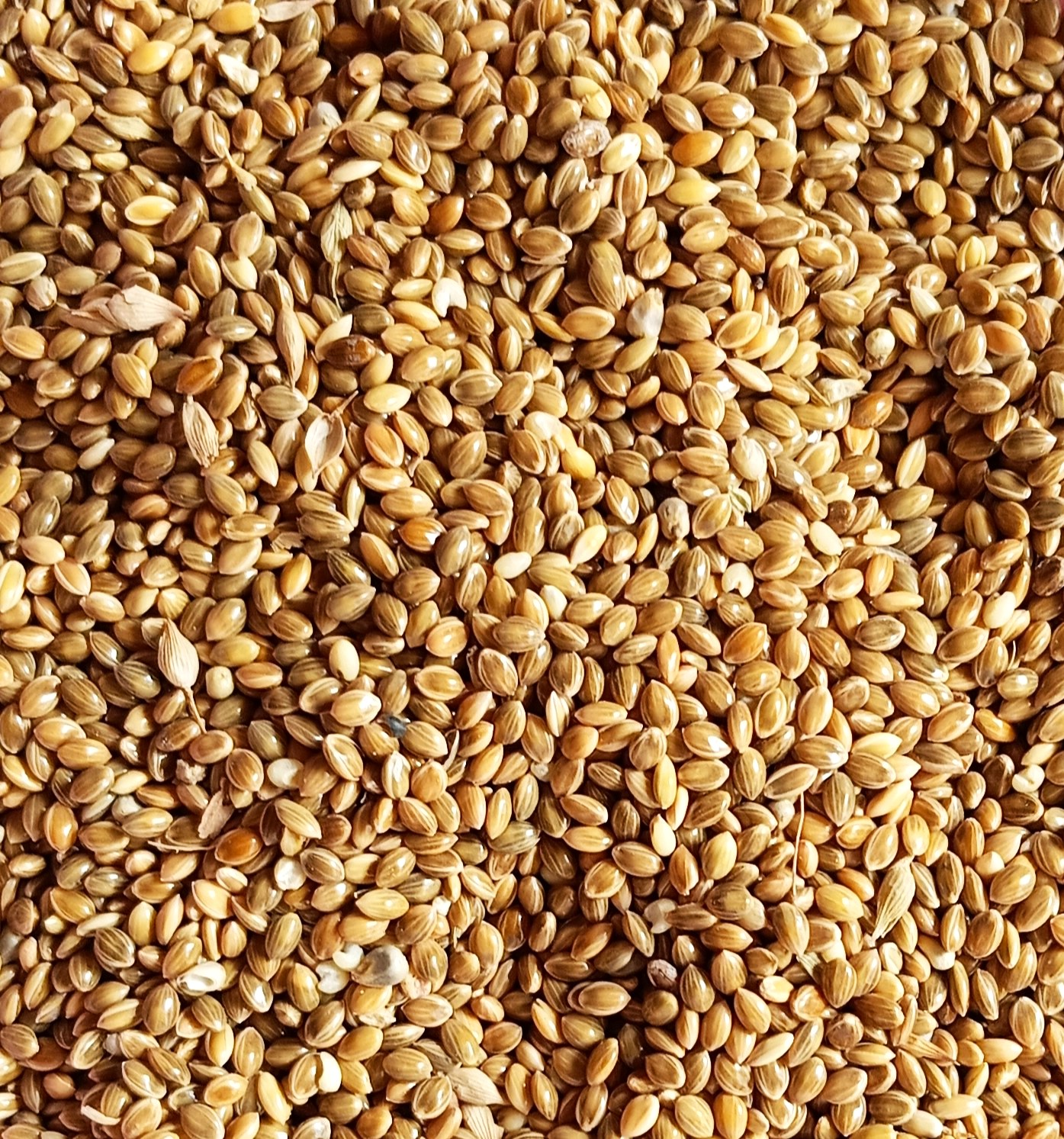
Foxtail millet (Setaria italica) seeds, India.

Foxtail millet, scientific name Setaria italica (synonym Panicum italicum L.), is an annual grass grown for human food. It is the second-most widely planted species of millet and the most grown millet species in Asia. The oldest evidence of foxtail millet cultivation was found along the ancient course of the Yellow River in Cishan, China, carbon dated to be from around 8,000 years ago.

Other names for the species include dwarf setaria, foxtail bristle-grass, giant setaria, green foxtail, Italian millet, German millet, and Hungarian millet.

== Description ==
Foxtail millet is an annual grass with slim, vertical, leafy stems which can reach a height of 120–200 cm (4–6 1/2 ft).

The seedhead is a dense, hairy panicle 5–30 cm (2–12 in) long.

The small seeds, around 2 millimetres (3/32 in) in diameter, are encased in a thin, papery hull which is easily removed in threshing. Seed color varies greatly between varieties.

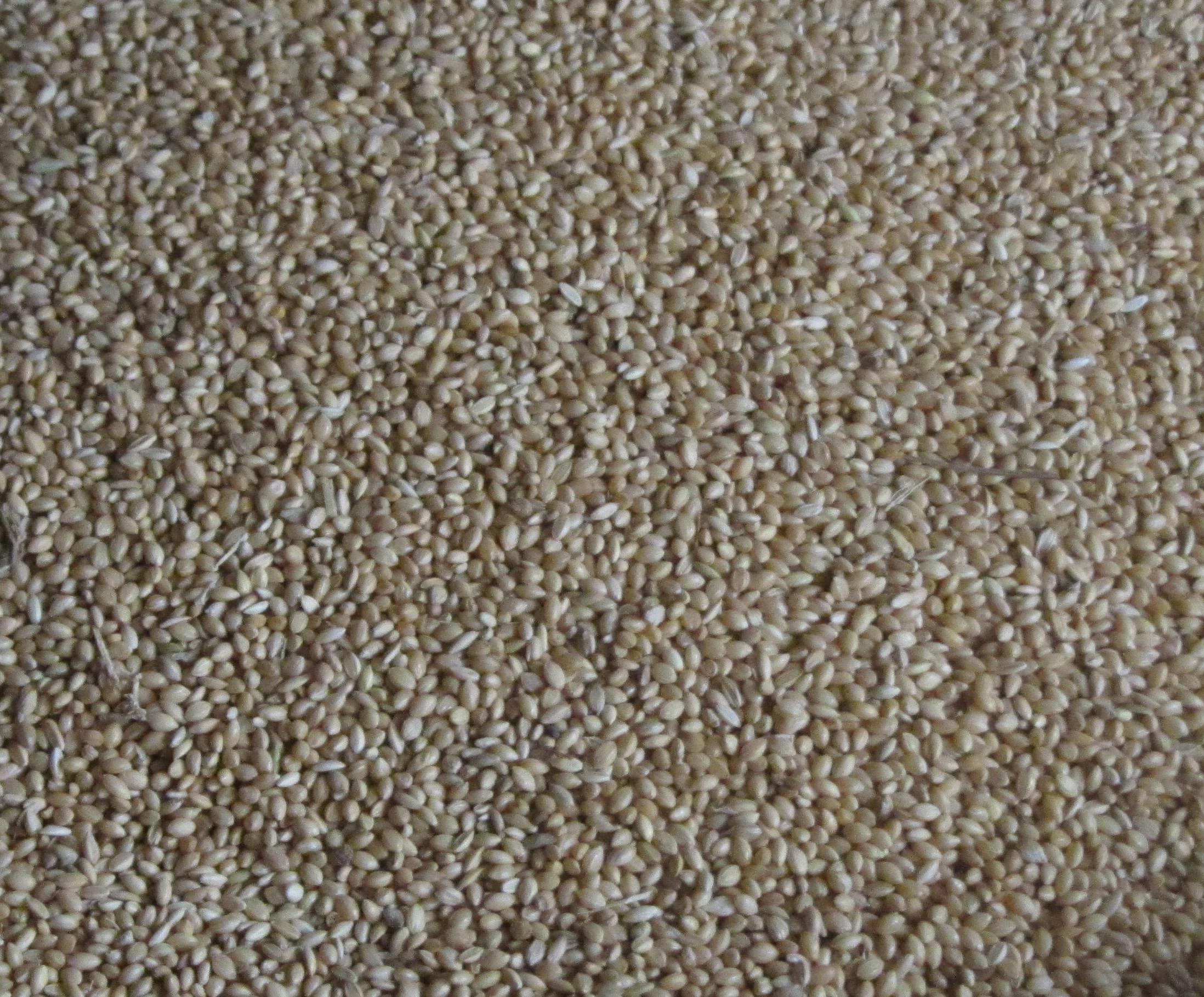
Seeds of foxtail millet

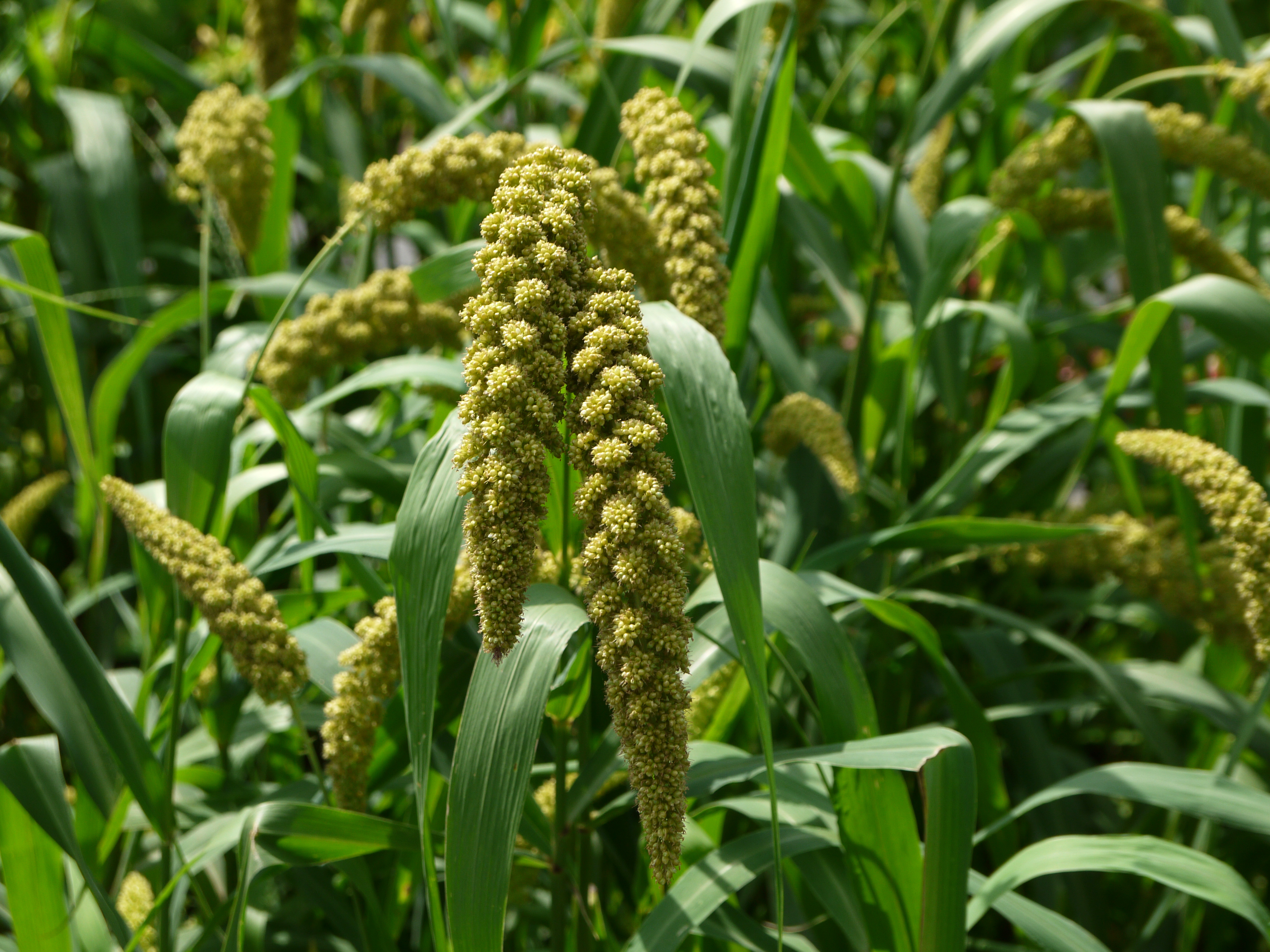
Mochi-Awa, Japanese foxtail

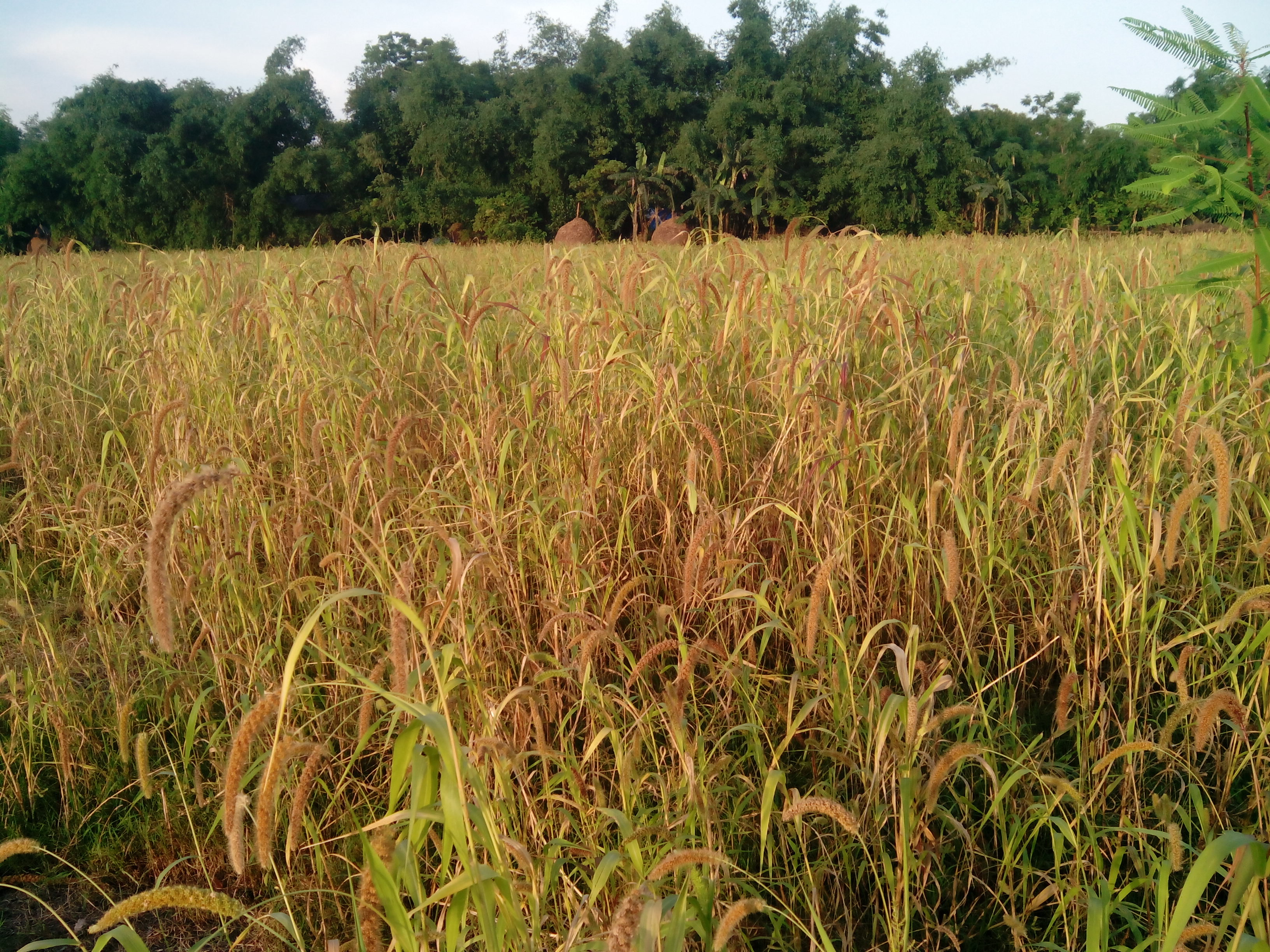
Millet fields in Bangladesh

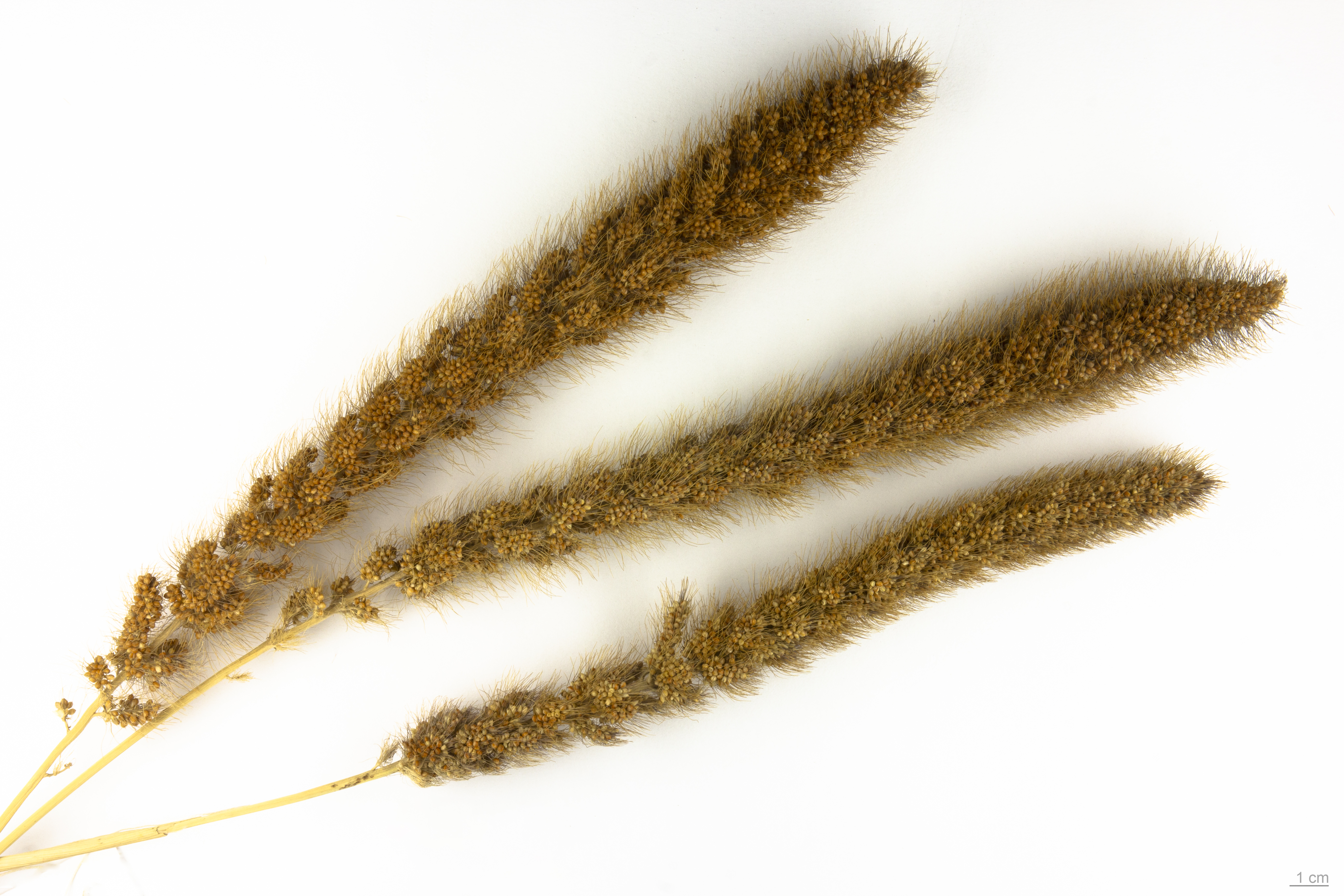
Setaria italica - MHNT

== Taxonomy ==
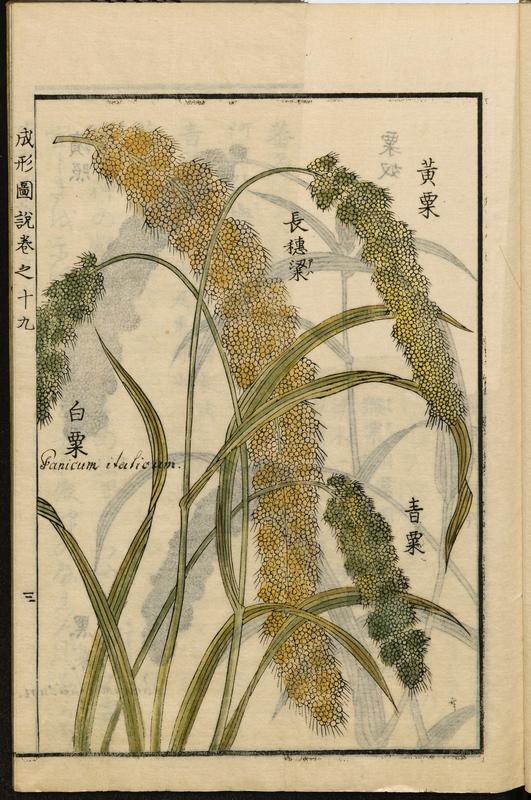
Japanese botanical drawing of Panicum italicum. From the Seikei Zusetsu (1804, volume19).

Synonyms:

- Alopecurus caudatus Thunb.
- Chaetochloa germanica (Mill.) Smyth
- Chaetochloa italica (L.) Scribn.
- Chamaeraphis italica (L.) Kuntze
- Echinochloa erythrosperma Roem. & Schult.
- Echinochloa intermedia Roem. & Schult.
- Ixophorus italicus (L.) Nash
- Oplismenus intermedius (Hornem.) Kunth
- Panicum aegyptiacum Roem. & Schult. nom. inval.
- Panicum asiaticum Schult. & Schult.f. nom. inval.
- Panicum chinense Trin.
- Panicum compactum Kit. nom. inval.
- Panicum elongatum Salisb. nom. illeg.
- Panicum erythrospermum Vahl ex Hornem.
- Panicum germanicum Mill.
- Panicum germanicum Willd. nom. illeg.
- Panicum globulare (J.Presl) Steud.
- Panicum glomeratum Moench nom. illeg.
- Panicum intermedium Vahl ex Hornem.
- Panicum italicum L.
- Panicum itieri (Delile) Steud.
- Panicum macrochaetum (Jacq.) Link
- Panicum maritimum Lam.
- Panicum melfrugum Schult. & Schult.f. nom. inval.
- Panicum miliaceum Blanco nom. illeg.
- Panicum moharicum (Alef.) E.H.L.Krause
- Panicum panis (Jess.) Jess.
- Panicum pumilum Link nom. illeg.
- Panicum serotinum Trin. nom. inval.
- Panicum setaceum Trin. nom. inval.
- Panicum setosum Trin. nom. inval.
- Panicum sibiricum Roem. & Schult. nom. inval.
- Panicum vulgare Wallr. nom. illeg.
- Paspalum germanicum (Mill.) Baumg.
- Penicillaria italica (L.) Oken
- Pennisetum erythrospermum (Vahl ex Hornem.) Jacq.
- Pennisetum germanicum (Mill.) Baumg.
- Pennisetum italicum (L.) R.Br.
- Pennisetum macrochaetum J.Jacq.
- Setaria asiatica Rchb. nom. inval.
- Setaria californica Kellogg
- Setaria compacta Schur nom. inval.
- Setaria erythrosperma (Vahl ex Hornem.) Spreng.
- Setaria erythrosperma Hornem. ex Rchb. nom. inval.
- Setaria flavida Hornem. ex Rchb. nom. inval.
- Setaria germanica (Mill.) P.Beauv.
- Setaria globulare J. Presl
- Setaria globularis J.Presl
- Setaria itieri Delile
- Setaria japonica Pynaert
- Setaria macrochaeta (Jacq.) Schult.
- Setaria maritima (Lam.) Roem. & Schult.
- Setaria melinis Link ex Steud.
- Setaria moharica Menabde & Erizin
- Setaria multiseta Dumort.
- Setaria pachystachya Borbás nom. illeg.
- Setaria panis Jess.
- Setaria persica Rchb. nom. inval.
- Setaria violacea Hornem. ex Rchb. nom. inval.
- Setariopsis italica (L.) Samp.

Common names for foxtail millet in other languages spoken in the countries where it is cultivated include:

- Assamese: কণী ধান (koni dhaan)
- Bengali: কাওন দানা (kaon dana)
- Bisaya: dawa
- Georgian: ღომი (ghomi)
- Gujarati: kang
- Gurung : tohro
- Hindi: कांगणी (Kangni)
- Japanese: awa (粟)
- Javanese: jawawut
- Khasi: krâi
- Kashmiri: pinga
- Kannada: ನವಣೆ (navane) or ನವಣಕ್ಕಿ (navanakki)
- Kokborok: Maichwi
- Korean: jo (조). The grain obtained from it is called jopsal (좁쌀), a word that is commonly used in Korean as a metaphor for pettiness or innumerable small things (such as bumps of a skin rash)
- Malay: sekoi, jawawut
- Mandarin Chinese: su (粟). Also called xiǎomǐ (小米), which is the term commonly used for the grain after it has been husked (husks have been removed); unhusked grain is called guzi (穀子) in Northern China.
- Marathi: kang or rala (राळं)
- Mingrelian: ღუმუ (ghum') or ჩხვერი (chkhver')
- Mising: anyak
- Nepali: Kaguno
- Odia: କଙ୍ଗୁ (kaṅgu) or ଟାଙ୍ଗଣ (ṭāṅgaṇa)
- Punjabi: ਕਂਗਣੀ/کنگنی (Kangni)
- Russian: mogar (могар) or chumiza (чумиза)
- Sanskrit: प्रियङ्गुः (priyangu) or कङ्गुः (kangu)
- Santali: gundli
- Sora: buroj
- Sinhala: thana haal
- Tamil: தினை (thinai), இறடி (iradi), ஏனல் (enal), கங்கு (kangu), கவலை kavalai, or kambankorai; nuvanam (millet flour). The gruel made from millet, the staple of Ancient Tamils, is called kali, moddak kali, kuul, or sangati
- Telugu: కొర్రలు (korralu or korra)
- Karbi: hanjangmilen

== Cultivation ==
=== History and domestication ===
The wild ancestor of foxtail millet has been securely identified as Setaria viridis, which is interfertile with foxtail millet; wild or weedy forms of foxtail millet also exist. Zohary and Hopf note that the primary difference between the wild and cultivated forms is "their seed dispersal biology. Wild and weedy forms shatter their seed while the cultivars retain them." The reference genome for foxtail millet was completed in 2012. Genetic comparisons also confirm that S. viridis is the antecedent of S. italica.

The earliest evidence of the cultivation of this grain comes from the Peiligang culture of China, which also cultivated Panicum miliaceum, but foxtail millet became the predominant grain only with the Yangshao culture. More recently, the Cishan culture of China has been identified as the earliest to domesticate foxtail millet around 6500–5500 BC. Foxtail millet has also been grown in India since antiquity.

The earliest evidence for foxtail millet cultivation outside of its native distribution is at Chengtoushan in the Middle Yangtze River region, dating to around 4000 BC. In southern China, foxtail millet reached the Chengdu Plain (Baodun) at around 2700 BC and Guangxi (near the Vietnamese border) at around 3000 BC. Foxtail millet also reached Taiwan (Nankuanli, Dapenkeng culture) at around 2800 BC and the Tibetan Plateau (Karuo) at around 3000 BC.

Foxtail millet likely reached Southeast Asia via multiple routes. The earliest evidence for foxtail millet in Southeast Asia comes from various sites in the Khao Wong Prachan Valley in central Thailand, with the site at Non Pa Wai providing the earliest date with direct AMS dating to around 2300 BC.

The earliest evidence for foxtail millet in East Siberia comes from the archaeological site at Krounovka 1 in Primorsky Krai, dating to around 3620–3370 BC. The earliest direct evidence for foxtail millet in Korea come from Dongsam-dong Shell Midden, a Jeulmun site in southern Korea, with a direct AMS date of around 3,360 BC. In Japan, the earliest evidence for foxtail millet comes from the Jōmon site at Usujiri in Hokkaido, dating to around 4,000 BP.

Foxtail millet arrived in Europe later; carbonized seeds first appear in the second millennium BC in central Europe. The earliest definite evidence for its cultivation in the Near East is at the Iron Age levels at Tille Hoyuk in Turkey, with an uncorrected radiocarbon date of about 600 BC.

=== Modern cultivation ===
In India, foxtail millet is still an important crop in its arid and semi-arid regions. In South India, it has been a staple diet among people for a long time from the Sangam period. It is referred to often in old Tamil texts and is commonly associated with Lord Muruga and his consort Valli.

In Karbi Anglong district of Assam, India, millets have been an integral part of the food system of the Karbis as well as the Jhum fields. Hanjangmilen, Karbi name of foxtail millets have been visible in the Jhum fields in the past. But today it is hardly visible in the Jhum fields. But farmers are now bringing the traditional crop back into their food system which needs little water, grows well on poor soil, is fast-growing and suffers from very few diseases.

In China, foxtail millet was the main staple food in the north before the Song dynasty, when wheat started to become the main staple food. It is still the most common millet and one of the main food crops in the dry northern part of the country, especially among the poor. In Southeast Asia, foxtail millet is commonly cultivated in its dry, upland regions. In Europe and North America it is planted at a moderate scale for hay and silage, and to a more limited extent for birdseed.

In the northern Philippines, foxtail millet was once an important staple crop, until its later replacement by wet-rice and sweet potato cultivation.

It is a warm season crop, typically planted in late spring. Harvest for hay or silage can be made in 65–70 days with a typical yield of 15,000–20,000 kilograms per hectare (6.7–8.9 short ton/acre) of green matter or 3,000–4,000 kilograms per hectare (1.3–1.8 short ton/acre) of hay. Harvest for grain is in 75–90 days with a typical yield of 800–900 kilograms per hectare (0.36–0.40 short ton/acre) of grain. Its early maturity and efficient use of available water make it suitable for raising in dry areas.

=== Pests ===
Diseases of foxtail millet include leaf and head blast disease caused by Magnaporthe grisea, smut disease caused by Ustilago crameri, and green ear caused by Sclerospora graminicola. The unharvested crop is also susceptible to attack by birds and rodents. Insect pests include Atherigona atripalpis, the foxtail millet shoot fly.

==== Insects ====
Insect pests include:

- shoot fly Atherigona atripalpis (major pest)
- A. approximata, A. pulla, A. punctata, and A. biseta
- cutworm Agrotis ipsilon
- stem borer Chilo partellus
- pink borer, Sesamia inferens
- corn borer, Ostrinia furnacalis

Leaf feeders

- armyworms, Mythimna separata, Spodoptera frugiperda, and S. litura
- leaf-feeding caterpillars Amsacta albistriga, A. moorei and A. lactinea
- ash weevil Myllocerus undecimpustulatus maculosus
- leaf beetle Oulema melanopus
- flea beetle Chaetocnema basalis
- leaf folder Cnaphalocrocis medinalis
- leaf roller Cnaphalocrocis patnalis
- surface grasshopper Chrotogonus hemipterus
- grasshopper Conocephalus maculatus

Earhead feeders

- green bug Nezara viridula

Others

- bugs, Cletus punctiger, Dolycoris indicus, and Nephotettix virescens
- aphid Melanaphis sacchari
- sugarcane leafhopper Pyrilla perpusilla

=== Agronomic genetics ===
As with some other cereals the waxy gene contributes to glutinousness. The wild relative Setaria viridis provides genetic resources useful for foxtail breeding.

One study found that – for the rabi crop in Tamil Nadu – breeding for foxtail yield should begin from germplasm with the most productive tillers, medium panicle length and medium duration.
