= William H. Weston Jr. =

American mycologist & plant pathologist (1890–1978)

- Born: January 24, 1890; New York City
- Died: August 3, 1978 (aged 88)
- Alma mater: Harvard University; Dartmouth College
- Occupation: Botanist, mycologist, botanical collector
- Employer: Harvard University; United States Department of Agriculture

William Henry Weston Jr. (1890–1978) was an American botanist, mycologist, and first president of the Mycological Society of America. Weston was known for his research in the fungal group known as the phycomycetes, particularly the pathogenic genus Sclerospora.

Weston received a BA from Dartmouth College in 1911, then received his MA in 1912 and PhD (under the supervision of Roland Thaxter) in 1915, both from Harvard University. (His nickname "Cap" went back to his captaincy of the Dartmouth skiing team.)

Weston worked for the U.S. Department of Agriculture and at Western Reserve University, then became assistant professor of botany, professor of cryptogamic botany, and chairman of the botany department at Harvard.

As "Plant Pathologist in Charge of Downy Mildew Investigations" for the USDA, Weston spent two years in the Philippines, studying downy mildew. One of several important papers from this period was his discovery of a new mechanism for dispersal by Sclerospora graminicola, involving explosive nocturnal discharge of spores. While at Harvard University, he continued to study diseases in tropical plant diseases, including Sclerospora and aquatic Phycomycetes. Other areas of study included wild forage grasses and coconut in Florida, sugarcane mosaic diseases in Cuba, and the fungi of Barro Colorado Island in Panama. Throughout his career, he championed an approach to the study of fungi that emphasized their biology, examining their life cycles, sexuality, morphogenesis, and discharge mechanisms.

Weston was elected to fellow of the American Association for the Advancement of Science and American Academy of Arts and Sciences. In 1962, he received the Civilian Distinguished Service Award from the United States Army for his work as a civilian consulting for the Quartermaster Corps. In 1979, the Mycological Society of America established the William H. Weston Award for Excellence in Teaching in his honor. The award is given each year to an outstanding undergraduate or graduate level teacher of mycology. Species named after Weston include Helicoma westonii and Septobasidium westonii.
