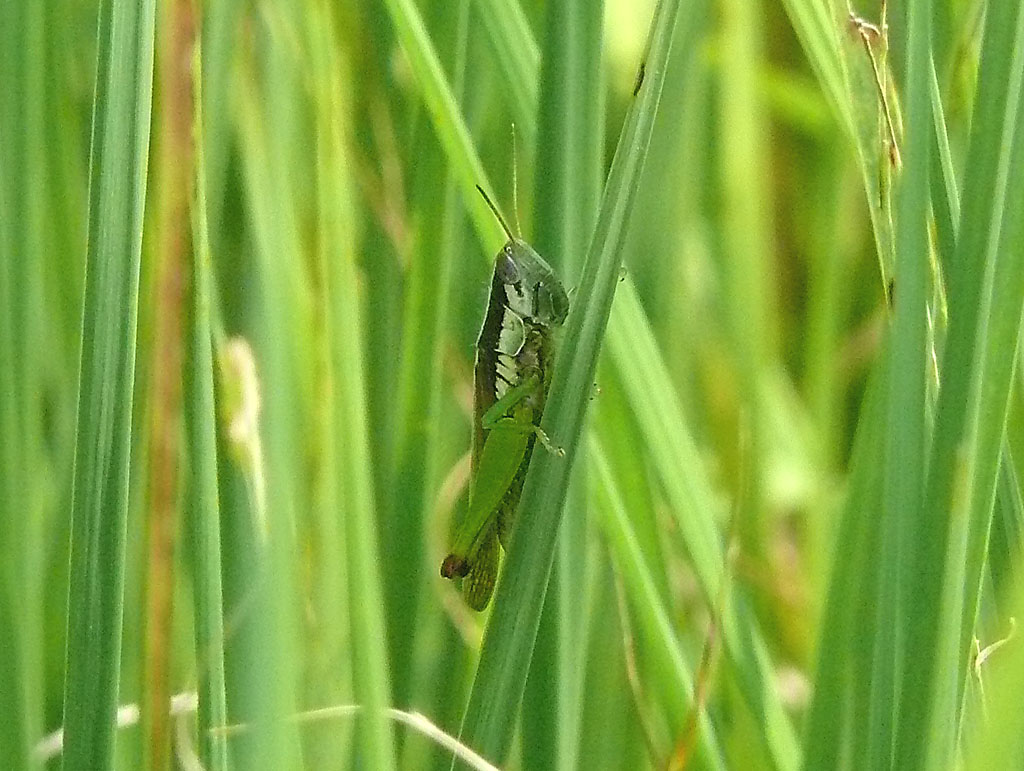

Scientific classification
- Kingdom: Animalia
- Phylum: Arthropoda
- Clade: Pancrustacea
- Class: Insecta
- Order: Orthoptera
- Suborder: Caelifera
- Family: Acrididae
- Subfamily: Oxyinae
- Genus: Oxya
- Species: O. hyla

Binomial name
- Oxya hyla Serville, 1831

= Oxya hyla =

Species of grasshopper

Oxya hyla is a species of grasshopper of the Acrididae family described by Serville in 1831.
