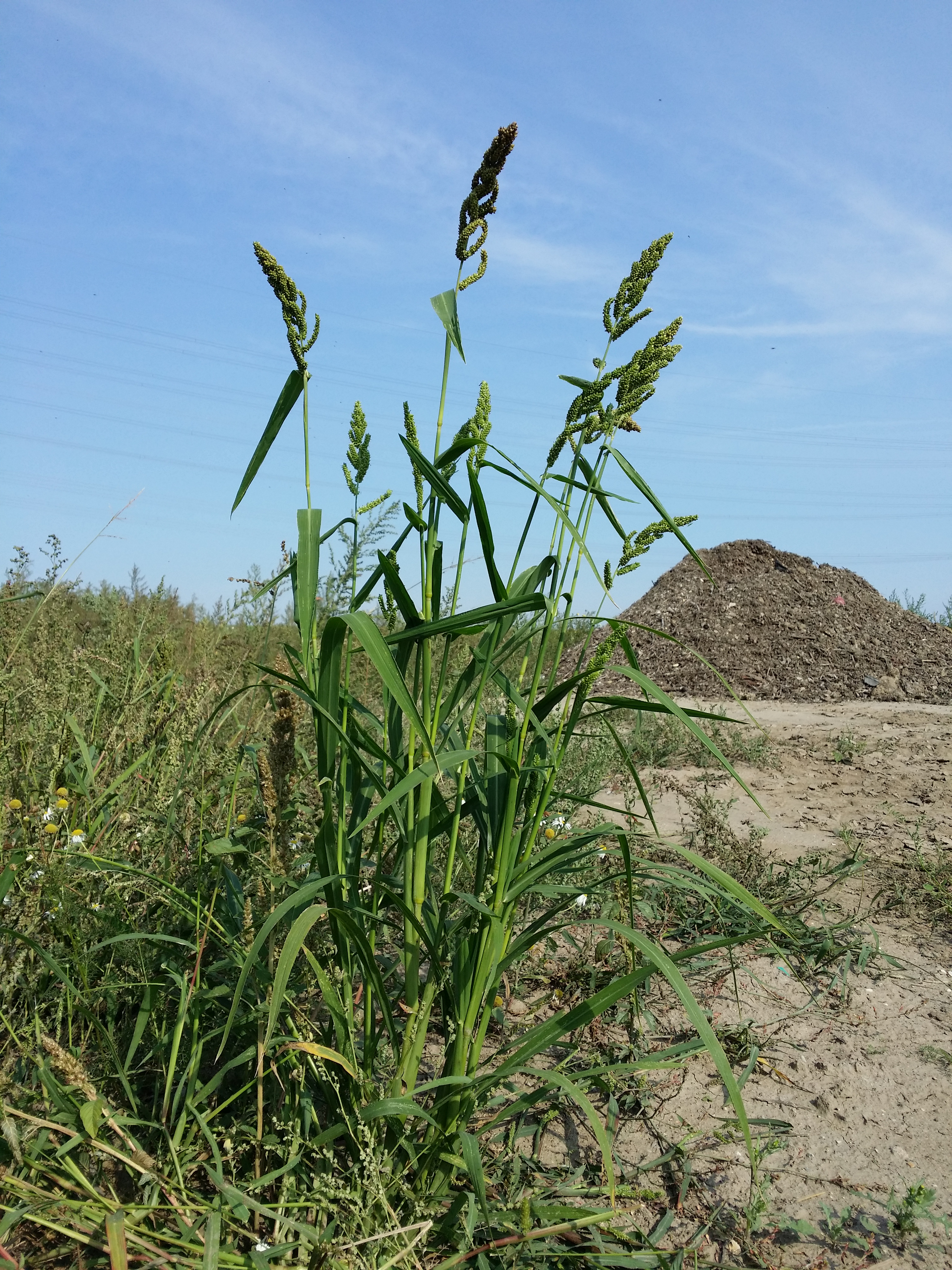

Scientific classification
- Kingdom: Plantae
- Clade: Tracheophytes
- Clade: Angiosperms
- Clade: Monocots
- Clade: Commelinids
- Order: Poales
- Family: Poaceae
- Subfamily: Panicoideae
- Genus: Echinochloa
- Species: E. esculenta

Binomial name
- Echinochloa esculenta (A.Braun) H.Scholz

Synonyms
- Echinochloa crus-galli subsp. utilis (Ohwi & Yabuno) T.Koyama; Echinochloa crus-galli var. utilis (Ohwi & Yabuno) Kit. Echinochloa utilis Ohwi & Yabuno; Panicum esculentum A.Braun

= Echinochloa esculenta =

Species of grass

Echinochloa esculenta or Echinochloa utilis is a type of millet originating from East Asia, and is part of the Poaceae family, making it a grass. E. esculenta is colloquially known as Japanese millet, but possesses many other names, such as: Japanese barnyard millet, marsh millet, Siberian millet, and white millet. Its primary usage in the US is for forage and for wildlife habitats. In Japan, Korea and northeastern China, the millet is grown on a small scale primarily for fodder. Japanese millet is not a main cereal crop, and is therefore considered an alternative crop.

Echinochloa species are generally considered to be short-lived, tropical short-day C4 plants that possess high vitality in humid conditions. Seeding is done in spring and flowering takes place in mid summer. Species from this genus show strong adaptation to soils with poor drainage and low fertility.

== Etymology ==
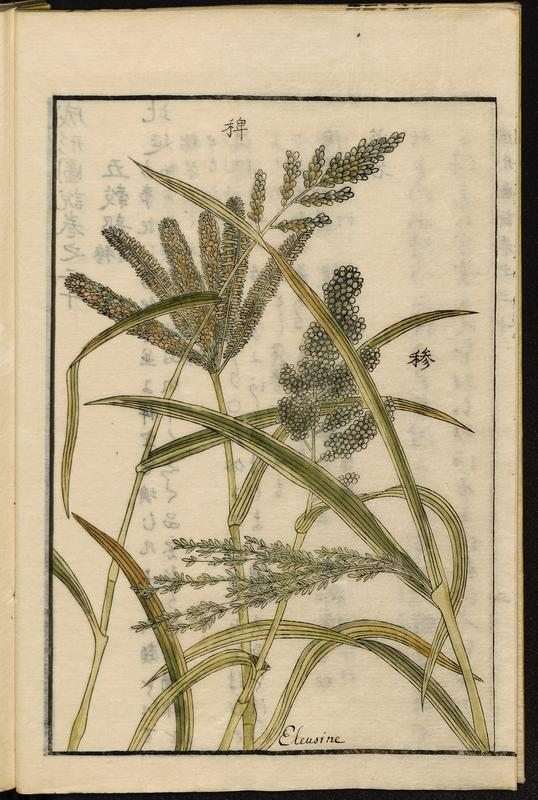
Echinochloa esculenta from the Seikei Zusetsu agricultural encyclopedia

Echinochloa is derived from Greek and means 'hedgehog-grass'.

Esculenta means 'fit to eat', 'edible [by humans]', or 'full of food'.

In Japanese, the plant is known as hie (稗, ヒエ).

== Morphology ==
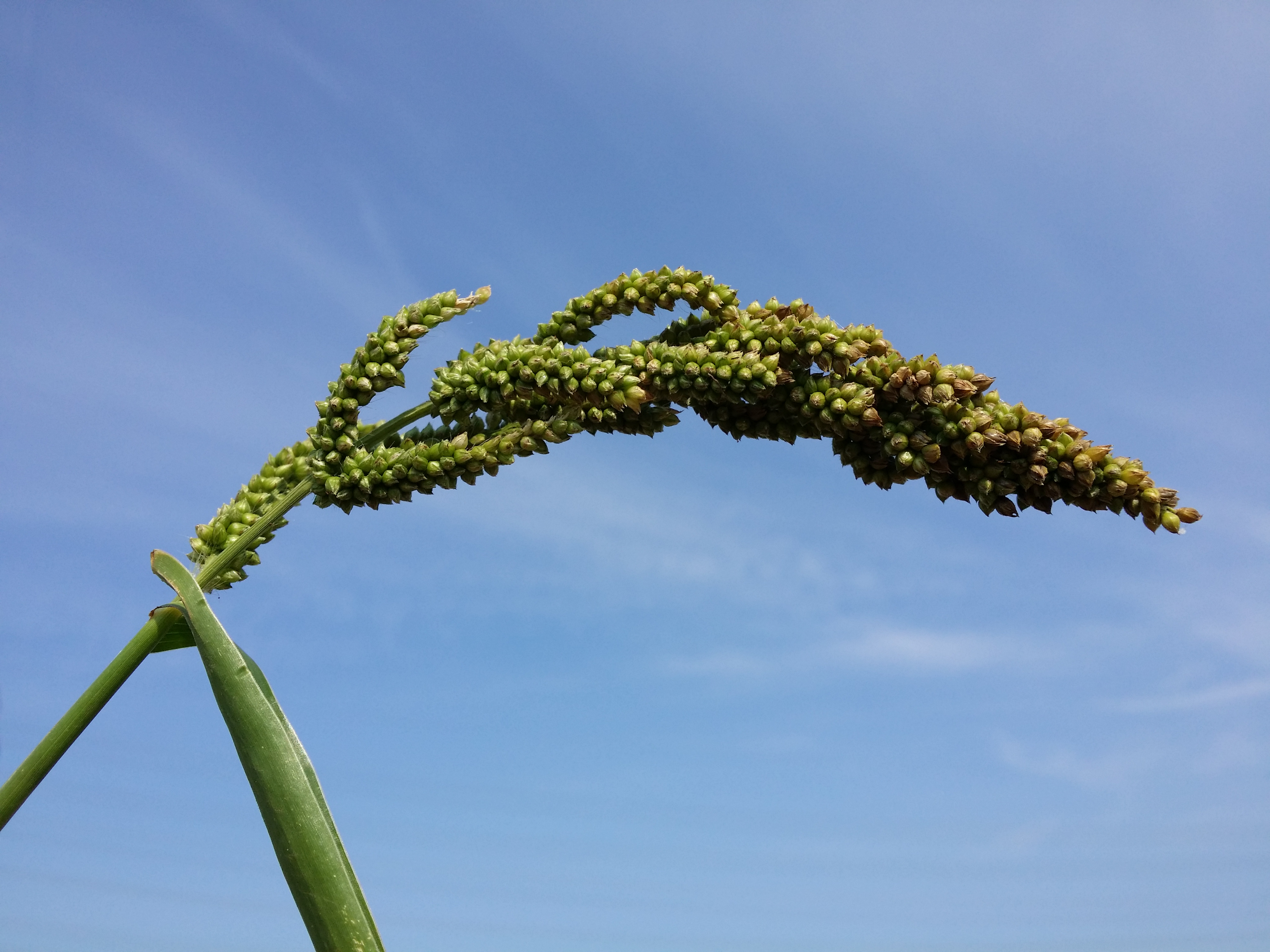
The ears of Echinochloa esculenta

Echinochloa esculenta is a robust plant with a thick stem and a height ranging from 60 to 122 cm (24 to 48 in). Furthermore, the plant has smooth leaf sheaths that are 10–50 cm (4–20 in) long and 7–25 mm (0.28–0.98 in) wide. The plant appears mostly green but shows light to dark purple pigmentation in various plant parts. The color of the inflorescence ranges from brown to purple.

== History ==
Japanese barnyard millet, along with the adzuki bean, holds a unique place in Japan's cultural history. These two crops are the only plants mentioned in Japan's two oldest authentic texts, the Kojiki and Nihon Shoki, compiled in 712 and 720 AD, respectively. According to these texts, these crops grew out of the dead body of a god, underscoring their mythical significance. Historical records and archaeological evidence further highlight the long-standing importance of barnyard millet in Japanese society.

One notable discovery illustrating its historical role was in the 12th century. The powerful Fujiwara family had three members mummified and laid in coffins in the Golden Hall of Chusonji, a Buddhist temple in Hiraizumi, Iwate Prefecture. In the coffin of Hidehira, one of the family members, 1.8 liters of unhulled barnyard millet grains were found scattered at its base, possibly used as pillow stuffing. Since Hidehira died in 1187, this discovery provides evidence of the grain's use during that time. Furthermore, family documents of the Nanbu feudal lords list varietal names of 29 early, 29 medium, and 44 late-maturing types of Japanese barnyard millet, reflecting its agricultural diversity and importance.

Barnyard millet was a staple food crop in Japan until the 1860s, prized for its adaptability to unfavorable climates and soil conditions. It was often grown alongside foxtail millet, buckwheat, Proso millet, and soybean, a combination known as the Five Grains (五穀, gokoku). The millet played a crucial role in sustaining populations during periods when rice production suffered due to cold temperatures, as it thrived where paddy rice could not. However, the introduction of cold-resistant rice varieties in later years, particularly after advancements highlighted by researchers such as Yabun (1987), led to a decline in its cultivation.

The decline of barnyard millet was evident in the significant reduction of its planting acreage. In 1880, 103,600 hectares were devoted to its cultivation, but by 1969, this number had plummeted to just 5,090 hectares. Currently, its cultivation is limited mainly to the northern regions of Iwate Prefecture. This reduction is primarily attributed to the development of superior rice varieties, which gradually replaced millet as a staple crop. Despite its diminished role today, Japanese barnyard millet remains an important symbol of resilience and adaptability in the country's agricultural history.

== Cultivation ==
Echinochloa esculenta is a warm season quick growing grass which can be cut for hay within 50 days of planting. It can be harvested up to 8 times a year. The average yield is 165kg/ 10 acres. Echinochloa esculenta's strength is that it can be cultivated in upland and paddy fields which are not suitable for paddy rice cultivation. The grain is also optimal for storage due to the tight coating of lemma and palea. The crop is grown around the world for various uses, however, India is among the biggest. Looking into the development of the crop approximately 120 cultivars are grown at the Northeast Agricultural Experiment Station in Japan.

== Management ==
For optimal growth, the USDA recommends growing Japanese millet without companion plants. It is a hardy and robust plant which requires minimal input once well established. Additionally, it should grow to 50 cm (20 in) before being cut; however, it can withstand repeated cuttings. To terminate the plant it should be undercut or mowed, furthermore it can not handle fire.

In Australia it is produced as a short-term rotating crop, used for grazing land during spring and early summer. It can be cultivated within a short time (2–3 months).

== Stress resistance ==
=== Biotic stressors ===
The cultivated species E. esculenta and E. frumentacea are widely threatened by pests and diseases. Examples of pests and diseases that cause damage to the millet are shoot flies (Atherigona sp.), stem borers, grain smut and loose smut. Heavy infestations of smuts were found to lead to a reduction in grain yield and quality when it occurs during head formation. However, there are certain accessions that showed immunity against both smut diseases.

=== Abiotic stressors ===
Generally, Echinochloa species have a high tolerance towards various abiotic stressors. Especially in environments that are prone to drought or flooding, species of the Echinochloa family are often preferred. They were found to have higher water uptake efficiency compared to other minor millets.

== Uses ==
Fodder yield of Japanese millet is about 6.3 tons/ha and contains 7.6% protein, 23% digestible fiber and 2% fat. Echinochloa esculenta and Echinochloa frumentacea are the two major species that are grown for human consumption and livestock feed in this genus. Compared to other major cereals, Echinochloa esculenta contains more micronutrients, especially iron and zinc. All current strains are non-glutinous.

=== Forage, feed and food ===
Currently, Japanese millet is commonly used as bird feed in Japan and often grown as forage in the United States. Due to the plant's ability to grow in flooded soils, it is ideal to grow around ponds for the feed of waterfowls in their natural habitats.

The straw of Japanese millet is superior in terms of protein and calcium content compared to rice, oat or timothy straw. The grain is grown both for human consumption and for fodder. It has been found to have protein contents nearly twice as high as that of polished rice.

Japanese millet is also used in traditional culinary foods and is part of the Five Grains (gokoku), which is a general term in Japanese to refer to staple grains.

== Potential uses ==
In the future, Japanese millet could be used to advance abiotic stress resistance in other cereals, through similar mechanisms or genes. It might also have potential for uses as a phyto-extractor in soils contaminated by heavy metals due to its hyper accumulation nature.

== See also ==
- Echinochloa frumentacea, also called Japanese millet
