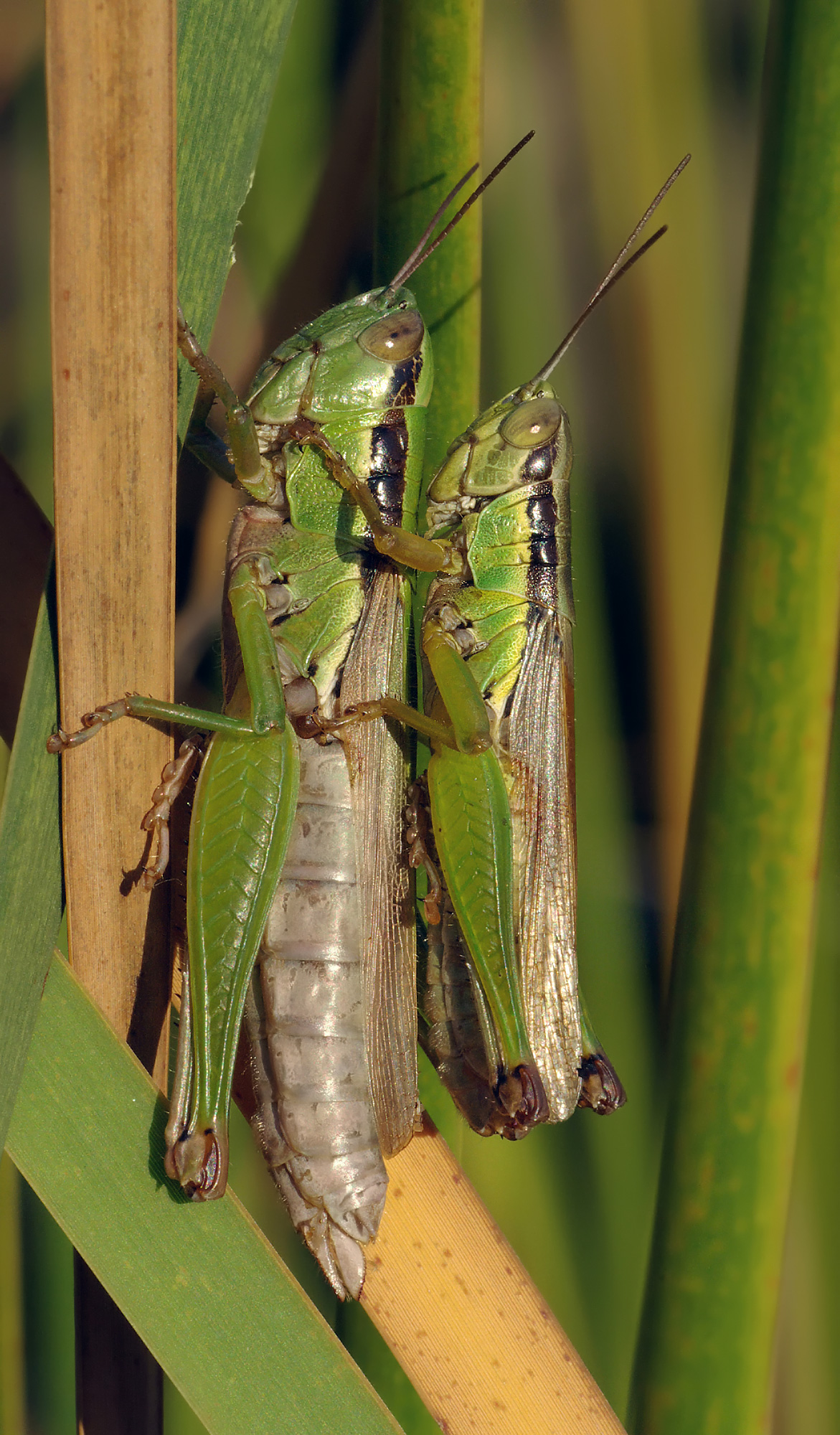
- Female (left) and male (right), taken in Osaka, Japan

Scientific classification
- Domain: Eukaryota
- Kingdom: Animalia
- Phylum: Arthropoda
- Class: Insecta
- Order: Orthoptera
- Suborder: Caelifera
- Family: Acrididae
- Subfamily: Oxyinae
- Tribe: Oxyini
- Genus: Oxya
- Species: O. yezoensis

Binomial name
- Oxya yezoensis Shiraki, 1910

Synonyms
- Oxya podisma Karny, 1915

= Oxya yezoensis =

Species of grasshopper

Oxya yezoensis is a species of rice-field grasshopper native to Japan. Referred to in Japanese as kobane-inago, it is a popular species of food insect, and is commonly cooked with soy sauce, sugar and sweet wine.
