= Sogatella molina =

Scientific classification
- Domain: Eukaryota
- Kingdom: Animalia
- Phylum: Arthropoda
- Class: Insecta
- Order: Hemiptera
- Suborder: Auchenorrhyncha
- Infraorder: Fulgoromorpha
- Family: Delphacidae
- Genus: Sogatella
- Species: S. molina

Binomial name
- Sogatella molina (Fennah, 1963)

Species of true bug

Sogatella molina is a species of delphacid planthopper in the family Delphacidae. It is found in the Caribbean, Central America, and North America.
