= Cruciferin =

Storage protein found in mustard and rapeseed

Cruciferin is one of the two most abundant seed storage proteins in mustard and rapeseed (Brassica napus L., Brassica juncea L. Czern., Brassica nigra L. W.D.J.Koch, Brassica rapa L. and Sinapis alba L.). They are classified as 11S globulins based on their sedimentation coefficient, and are salt soluble neutral glycoproteins. Their molecular weights range from 20 to 40 kDa. They comprise up to 50–70% of the total seed protein. Cruciferin is a comparatively larger seed storage protein than napin. It is composed of two polypeptide chains α and β. The α-chain has a mass of 30 kDa and the β-chain weighs in at 20 kDa. They are held together by a disulphide bond.

== Function ==
Seed storage proteins accumulate during the seed filling process and serve as a source of nitrogen and amino acids for the germinating embryo. At 23 days after anthesis, cruciferin mRNA is first found in the growing Brassica napus embryos. It then accumulates to peak levels at about 38 days following anthesis, and in dried seeds, it decreases to levels that are hardly detectable. While the general pattern of cruciferin mRNA accumulation in Brassica napus has been well-defined, the expression patterns of the individual members of the gene family remain mostly unknown. The cruciferin precursor peptide mapping indicates that there are three different precursor peptide subfamilies (P1, P2, and P3). Nucleotide sequence analysis suggests that two cruciferin cDNA clones (pCRU 1 and pC 1), which have been obtained, encode members of the B. napus subfamilies P1 and P2, respectively.

== Human consumption ==
Cruciferin is a vital component of the human and animal diet, providing essential amino acids and other nutrients necessary for growth and overall health. Its presence in various cruciferous vegetables makes them a valuable source of plant-based protein, which has gained popularity among individuals seeking to adopt healthier dietary choices. Additionally, cruciferin's role as a nutrient storehouse is particularly important for seedlings, as it supplies the energy and building blocks required for their development.

Beyond its significance in human and animal nutrition, cruciferin has also become a subject of interest in the field of agriculture. Plant breeders and biotechnologists are exploring ways to enhance the content of this protein in crop plants to improve their nutritional value and resistance to pests and diseases. Cruciferin-rich seeds have the potential to address global food security challenges by increasing the yield and nutritional quality of crops.

Research into cruciferin's properties and potential applications is ongoing and is not just a protein but a multifaceted entity that bridges the gap between plant biology, nutrition, and agricultural innovation. Its importance in providing essential nutrients and contributing to sustainable food production makes it a subject of both scientific inquiry and practical significance in our quest for a healthier, more sustainable world.

== Genes ==
Circling back to the Brassicaceae Family, within the mustard branch Arabidopsis was found to be mostly composed of cruciferins that are encoded with three genes being; CRU1, CRU2 and CRU3. The identification of ssp1, a viable recessive mutant, accumulates 15% less protein than seeds of the wild type. According to molecular investigations, CRU3, one of the main cruciferin genes, introduced a premature stop codon, leading to the occurrence of ssp1.

== Structure ==
The disulfide bonds in question do not stabilize the polypeptides. It was also discovered that the peculiar polypeptide sequence of cruciferin is made up of chains that are linked by both disulfide and noncovalent bonds. Both α and β polypeptide chains originate from the same precursor molecule, which is produced into the rough endoplasmic reticulum through co-translation. The polypeptide chain's N- and C-terminal segments create a disulfide bond when the endoplasmic reticulum signal peptide is broken during import. All members of the cruciferin family share the characteristic conserved 12S globulin cleavage site between asparagine and glycine, and they are all secreted into the endoplasmic reticulum like similar 12S globulins. It is believed that they are stored as hexamers in protein storage vacuoles (PSVs) and are transferred as trimers via the Golgi apparatus. The 12S globulins cruciferin are labeled as neutral proteins.

The hydrophobic components of cruciferin are dispersed throughout its surface while the hydrophobic components of napin are located in one area. The hydrophobic content allows it to acquire suitable emulsifying properties and allows for high affinity. Furthermore, it is important in maintaining the protein stability and biological activity as it allows the protein to decrease in surface area and reduce the interactions with water.

By altering environmental variables, such as temperature, pH, and ionic strength, changing molecular components, such as reducing S-S bonds, attaching hydrophobic groups, including acyl residues, partial hydrolysis, or conjugation with polysaccharides, 11S globulins can be made more effective at emulsifying substances.

The seed protein, cruciferin, resides in two protein families being cupin superfamily and 2S albumin while containing a complex group of 6 monomers and a primarily β-sheet-containing secondary structure. The 6 subunits vary depending on the pH and ionic strength. Cruciferin is a hexamer in its natural configuration. It was also gathered that more than ten polypeptides make up cruciferin, and noncovalent bonds have a more significant role in maintaining the structural shape than the work of disulfide bonds. When napin and cruciferin are in the presence of each other one will always dominate the other, meaning there cannot be an equal or close amount simultaneously.
