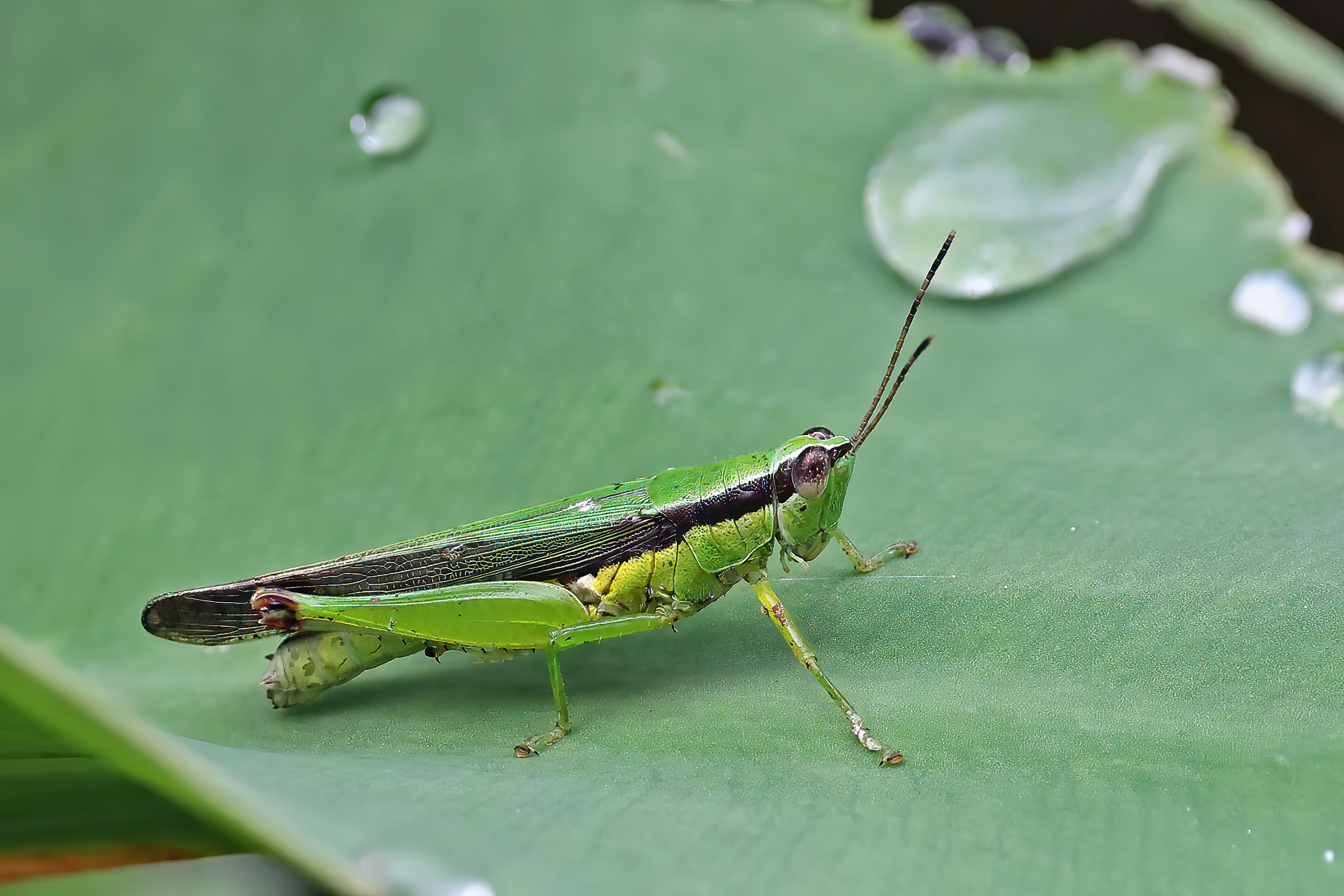
- in Thailand

Scientific classification
- Kingdom: Animalia
- Phylum: Arthropoda
- Clade: Pancrustacea
- Class: Insecta
- Order: Orthoptera
- Suborder: Caelifera
- Family: Acrididae
- Subfamily: Oxyinae
- Genus: Oxya
- Species: O. japonica

Binomial name
- Oxya japonica (Thunberg, 1815)

= Oxya japonica =

Species of grasshopper

Oxya japonica, also known as the Japanese grasshopper or rice grasshopper, is a species of short-horned grasshopper in the family Acrididae. It is found in Indomalaya and China, Japan, and Korea where it is considered a pest of rice.

== Subspecies ==
These subspecies belong to the species Oxya japonica:

- Oxya japonica japonica (Thunberg, 1815)
- Oxya japonica vitticollis (Blanchard, 1853)
