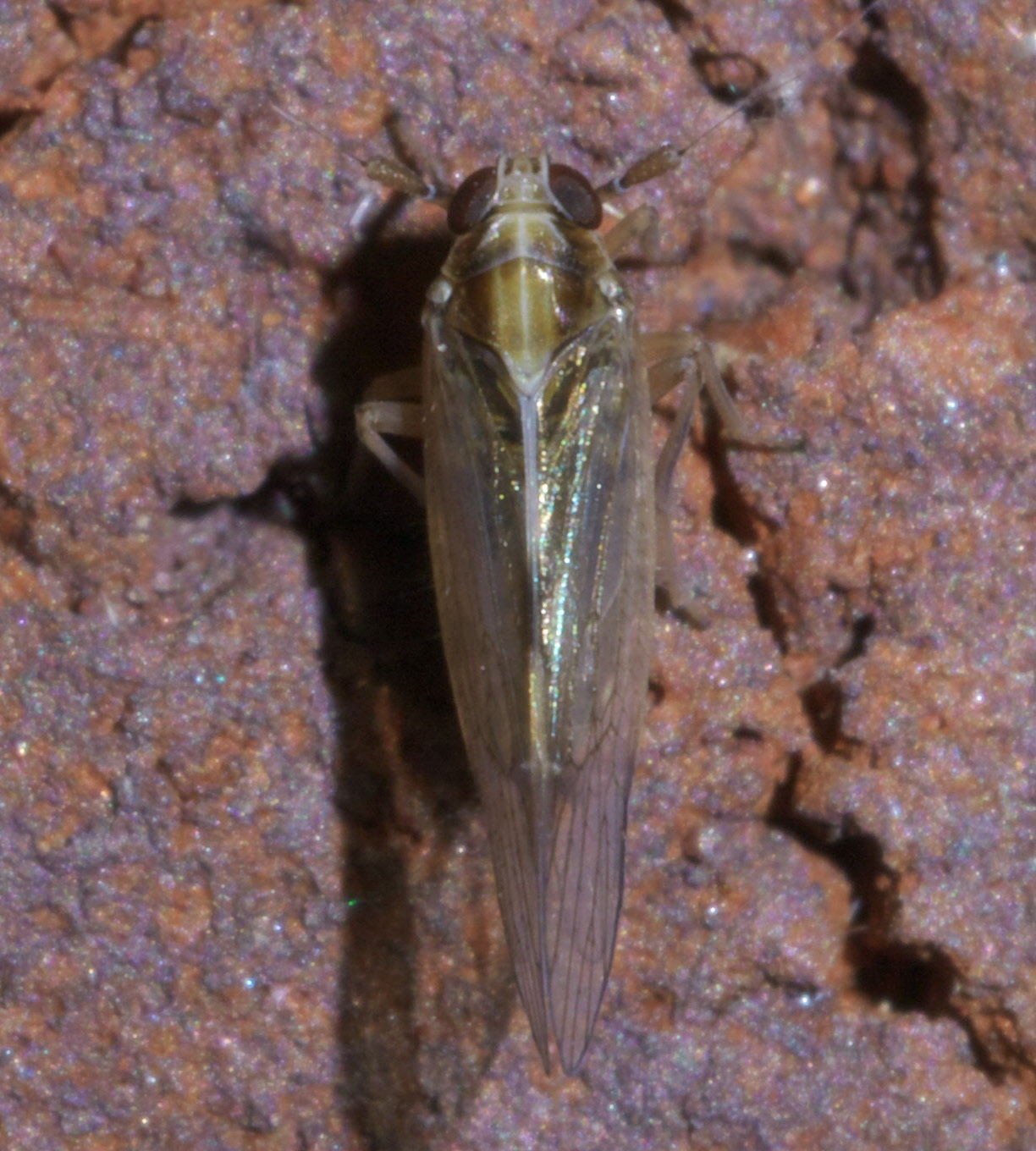

Scientific classification
- Domain: Eukaryota
- Kingdom: Animalia
- Phylum: Arthropoda
- Class: Insecta
- Order: Hemiptera
- Suborder: Auchenorrhyncha
- Infraorder: Fulgoromorpha
- Family: Delphacidae
- Tribe: Delphacini
- Genus: Sogatella; Fennah, 1956

Synonyms
- Sogatodes Fennah, 1963

= Sogatella =

Genus of planthoppers

Sogatella is a genus of delphacid planthoppers in the family Delphacidae. There are more than 20 described species in Sogatella.

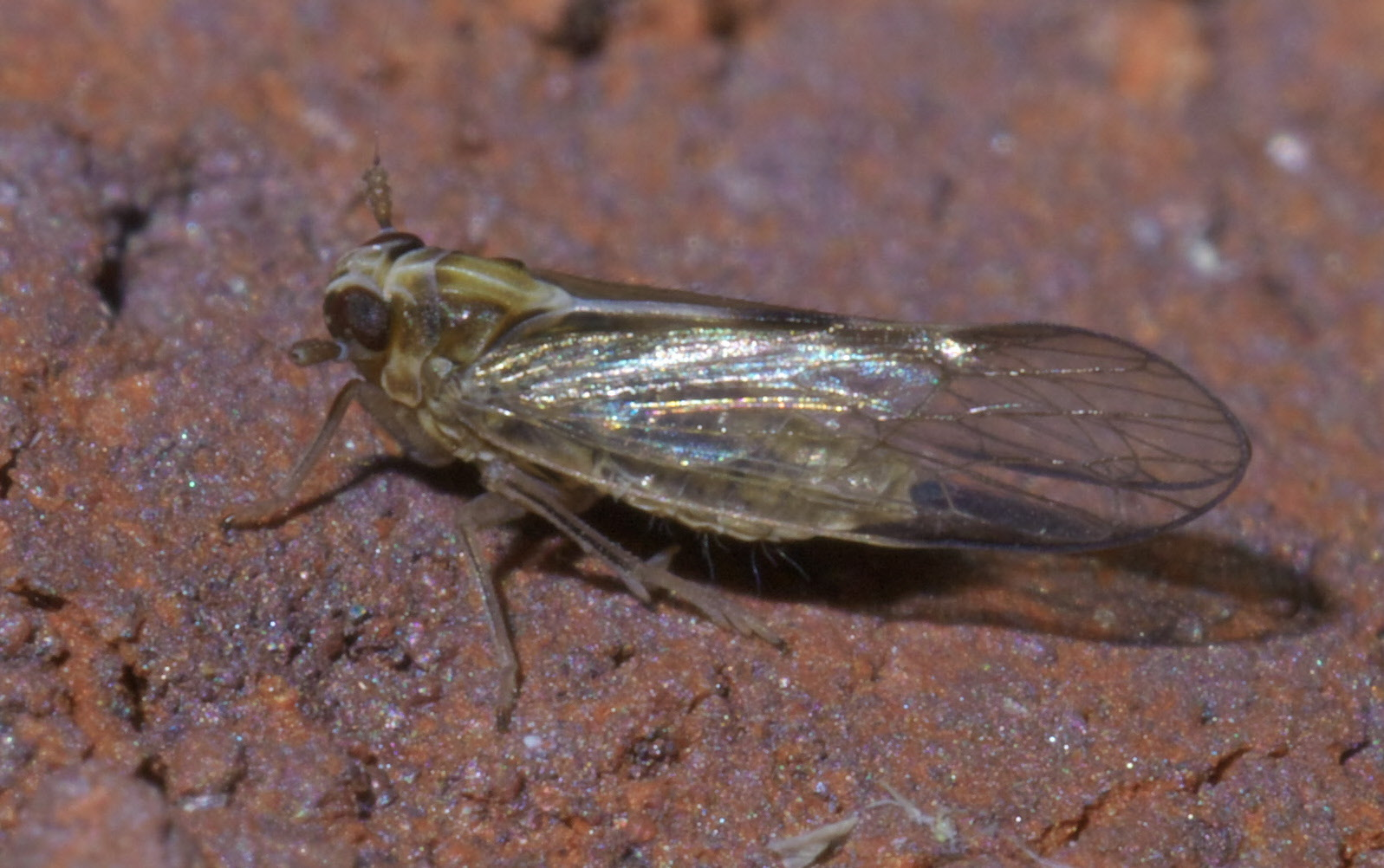

== Species ==
These 21 species belong to the genus Sogatella:

- Sogatella albofimbriata (Muir, 1926)
- Sogatella camptistylis Fennah, 1963
- Sogatella capensis (Muir, 1929)
- Sogatella colorata (Motschulsky, 1863)
- Sogatella eupompe Kirkaldy, 1907
- Sogatella furcifera (Horváth, 1899), SE Asia rice pest. Genome:
- Sogatella gemina Fennah, 1963
- Sogatella geranor (Kirkaldy, 1907)
- Sogatella kolophon (Kirkaldy, 1907)
- Sogatella krugeri (Muir, 1929)
- Sogatella manetho Fennah, 1963
- Sogatella molina (Fennah, 1963)
- Sogatella nigeriensis (Muir, 1920)
- Sogatella nigrigenis (Jacobi, 1917)
- Sogatella panicicola (Ishihara, 1949)
- Sogatella petax Fennah, 1963
- Sogatella subana (Crawford, 1914)
- Sogatella timaea Fennah, 1969
- Sogatella unidentata Mariani & Remes Lenicov, 2017
- Sogatella vibix (Haupt, 1927)
- Sogatella yei Linnavuori, 1973
