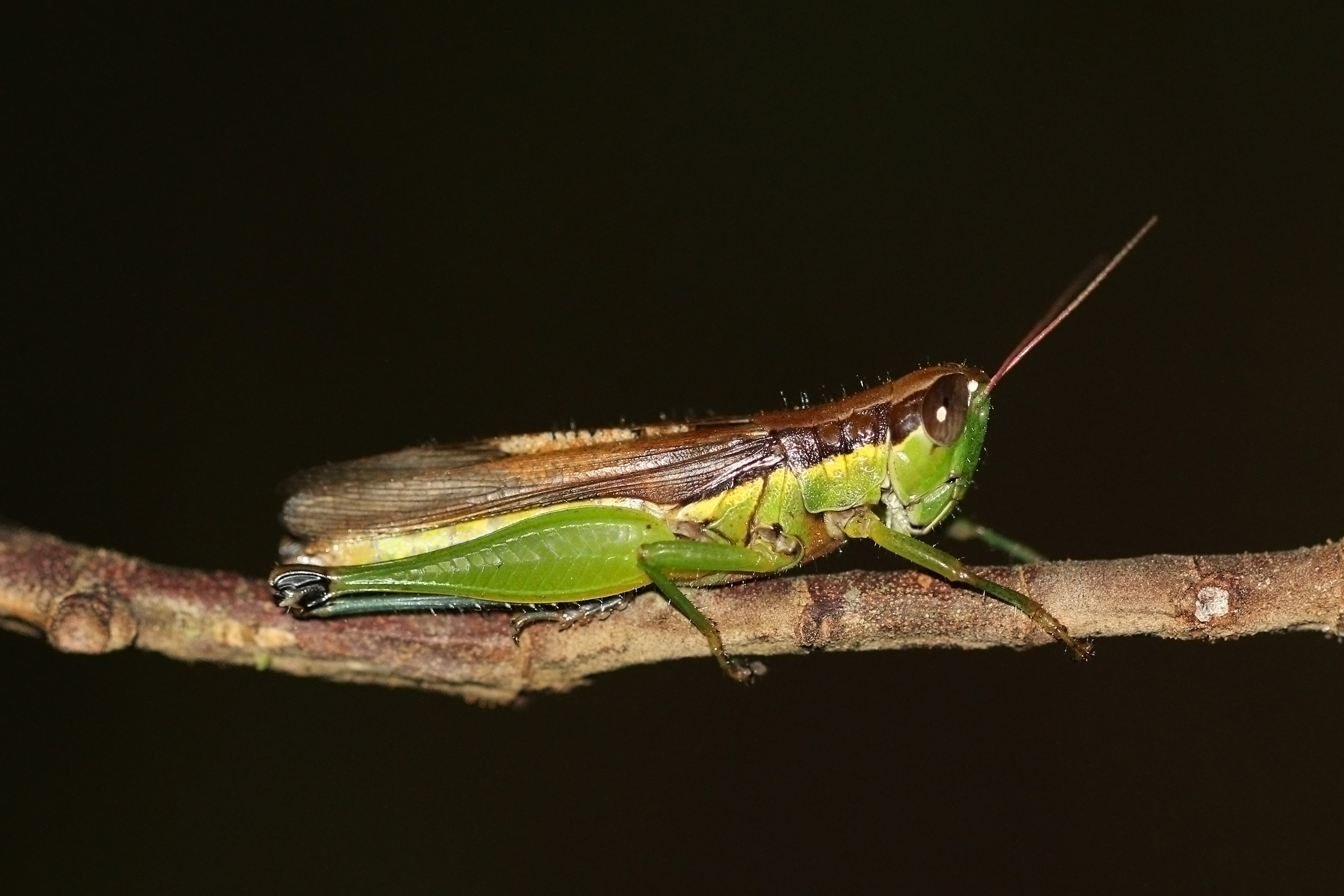
- Oxya chinensis, Malaysia

Scientific classification
- Domain: Eukaryota
- Kingdom: Animalia
- Phylum: Arthropoda
- Class: Insecta
- Order: Orthoptera
- Suborder: Caelifera
- Family: Acrididae
- Subfamily: Oxyinae
- Genus: Oxya
- Species: O. chinensis

Binomial name
- Oxya chinensis (Thunberg, 1815)

= Oxya chinensis =

Species of grasshopper

Oxya chinensis is a species of short-horned grasshopper in the family Acrididae. It is found in south and eastern Asia, and Oceania.
