= Oxya bidentata =

Scientific classification
- Kingdom: Animalia
- Phylum: Arthropoda
- Class: Insecta
- Order: Orthoptera
- Suborder: Caelifera
- Family: Acrididae
- Subfamily: Oxyinae
- Genus: Oxya
- Species: O. bidentata

Binomial name
- Oxya bidentata (Willemse, 1925)

Species of grasshopper

Oxya bidentata is a species of grasshopper in the family Acrididae. It is a pest of millets.

== Distribution ==
The species is distributed across South and Western Asia. Its range includes India (specifically the north-western region), Pakistan (recorded in Sindh, Punjab, and Khyber Pakhtunkhwa), Nepal, Afghanistan, and Iran.

== Ecology and pest status ==
Oxya bidentata is a polyphagous pest that feeds on a variety of crops. It is particularly noted as a major pest of rice, often causing damage during the crop's milky grain stage. It also feeds on maize, sorghum, and fodder grasses like Cynodon dactylon

== Description ==
The species has a moderate-sized body that is green to pale green in colour. It can be distinguished by its cerci (appendages at the rear of the abdomen), which in males are conical and bilobed (bidentate) at the apex, a feature that gives the species its specific epithet.
