= Haplothrips ganglbaueri =

Scientific classification
- Kingdom: Animalia
- Phylum: Arthropoda
- Class: Insecta
- Order: Thysanoptera
- Family: Phlaeothripidae
- Genus: Haplothrips
- Species: H. ganglbaueri

Binomial name
- Haplothrips ganglbaueri Schmutz, 1913

Species of thrips

Haplothrips ganglbaueri is a species of thrips. It is a pest of millets.
