= Sogatella furcifera =

Scientific classification
- Kingdom: Animalia
- Phylum: Arthropoda
- Clade: Pancrustacea
- Class: Insecta
- Order: Hemiptera
- Suborder: Auchenorrhyncha
- Infraorder: Fulgoromorpha
- Family: Delphacidae
- Genus: Sogatella
- Species: S. furcifera

Binomial name
- Sogatella furcifera (Horváth, 1899)

Synonyms
- Delphax furcifera

Species of insect

Sogatella furcifera, also known as the "white-backed planthopper" (WBPH) is a species of planthopper in the family Delphacidae. It is a pest of rice and sorghum in Asia and the Middle East.

== Ecological Impact ==
The WBPH species has a large ecological and economic impact on China and immediate countries. S. furcifera can damage rice directly by feeding on the rice or indirectly by transmitting plant viruses such as southern rice black-streaked dwarf virus (SRBSDV).

S. furcifera can also cause unexpected damage to local rice crops due to their ability to annually migrate long distances.

== Migratory Patterns ==
Sogatella furcifera is a migratory pest of rice in Asia, migrating from tropical and subtropical regions toward northern or northeast Asia in spring and summer. At the end of growing season in autumn, their offspring migrate back to their southern overwintering sites.

In the 1970s and 1980s, a study of the WBPH was conducted. The study concluded that spring immigrants were from the Indochina Peninsula, and that they migrated into southern China. The WBPH that migrated to China continue to move toward northern China on prevailing winds.

Later trajectory analyses and migration simulations indicate that the East Asian populations of WBPH overwinter in Vietnam and southern Hainan Province, and in spring migrate to eastern China, Japan, and Korea, then migrate back in autumn.
