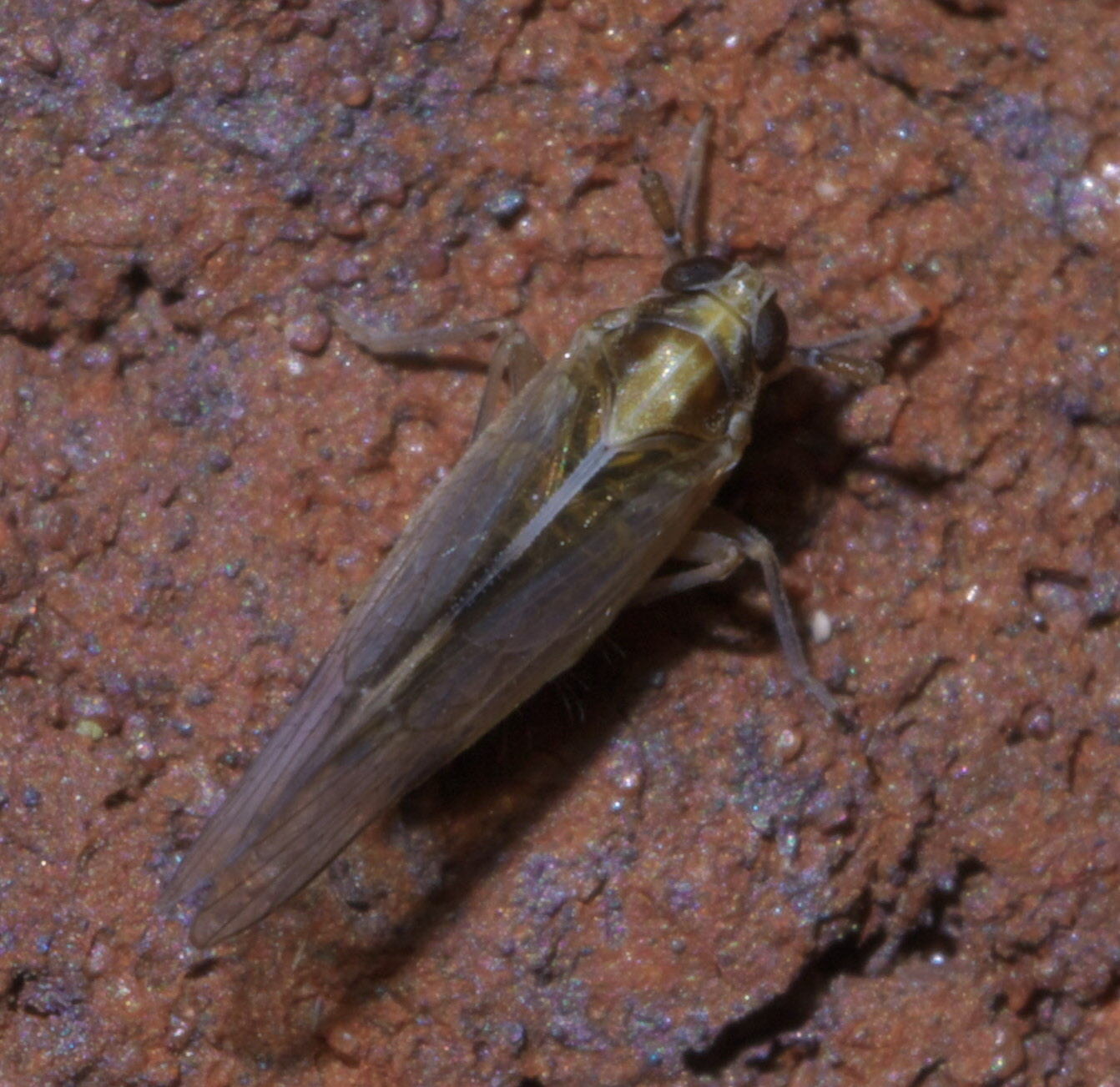

Scientific classification
- Domain: Eukaryota
- Kingdom: Animalia
- Phylum: Arthropoda
- Class: Insecta
- Order: Hemiptera
- Suborder: Auchenorrhyncha
- Infraorder: Fulgoromorpha
- Family: Delphacidae
- Genus: Sogatella
- Species: S. kolophon

Binomial name
- Sogatella kolophon (Kirkaldy, 1907)

= Sogatella kolophon =

Species of true bug

Sogatella kolophon is a species of delphacid planthopper in the family Delphacidae. It is found in Africa, Australia, the Caribbean, Central America, North America, Oceania, South America, and Southern Asia.

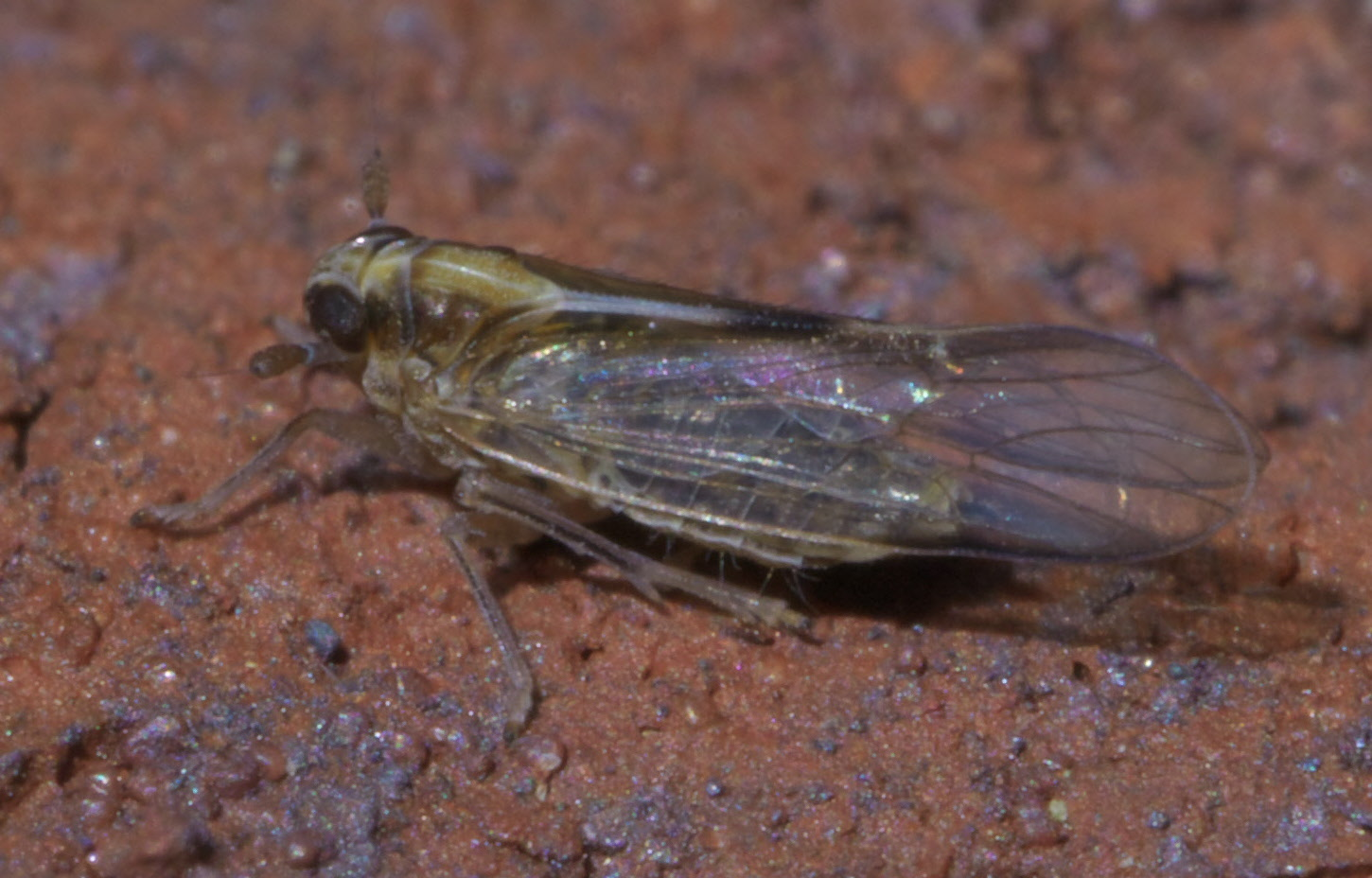

== Subspecies ==
Three subspecies belong to the species Sogatella kolophon:

- Sogatella kolophon atlantica Fennah, 1963^{c g}
- Sogatella kolophon kolophon^{g}
- Sogatella kolophon meridiana (Beamer, 1952)^{c g}

Data sources: i = ITIS, c = Catalogue of Life, g = GBIF, b = Bugguide.net
