= Oxya nitidula =

Scientific classification
- Kingdom: Animalia
- Phylum: Arthropoda
- Class: Insecta
- Order: Orthoptera
- Suborder: Caelifera
- Family: Acrididae
- Subfamily: Oxyinae
- Genus: Oxya
- Species: O. nitidula

Binomial name
- Oxya nitidula (Walker, 1870)

Synonyms
- Acridium nitidulum

Species of grasshopper

Oxya nitidula is a species of grasshopper in the family Acrididae. It is a pest of millets such as sorghum and pearl millet in India.
