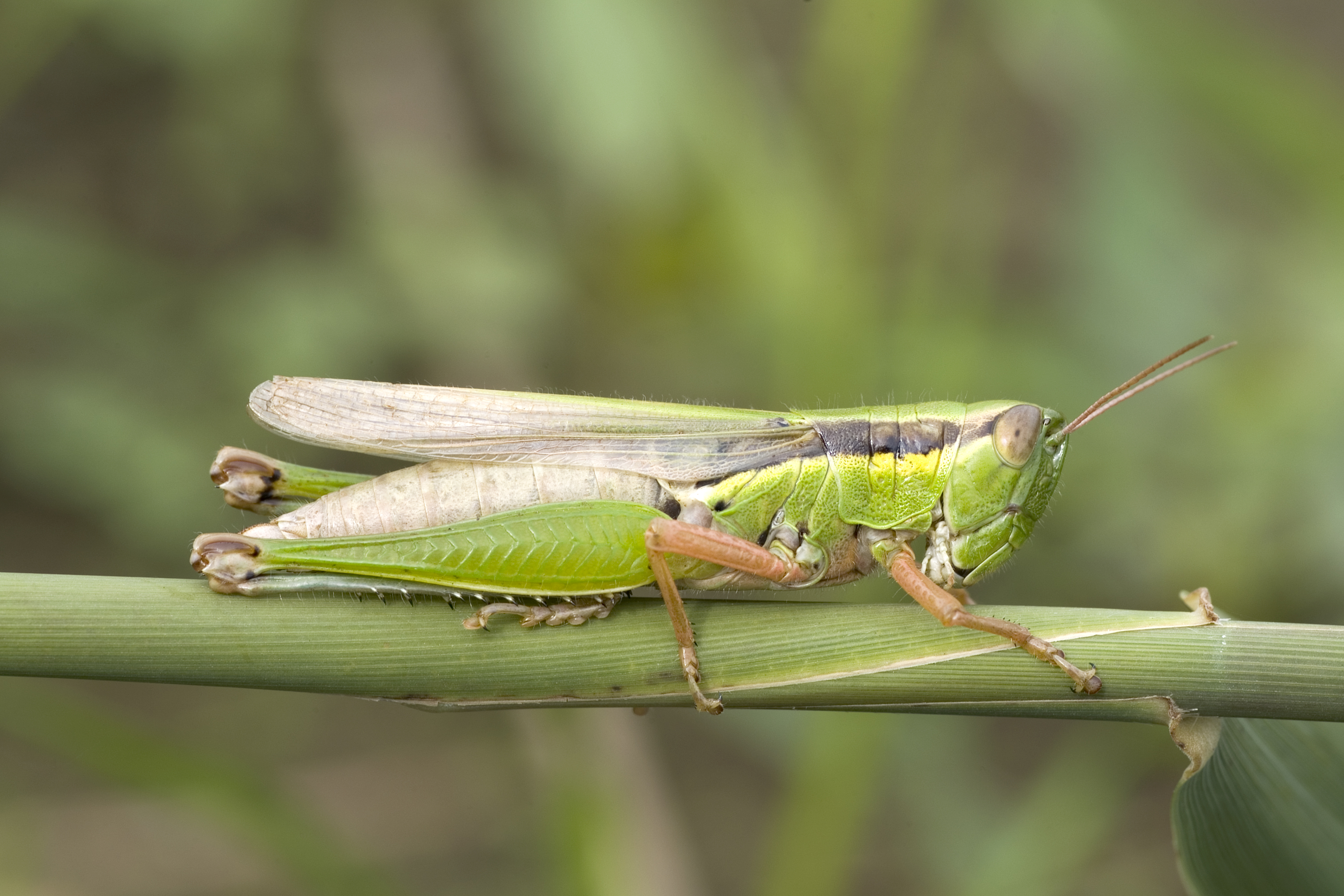
- Oxya yezoensis

Scientific classification
- Domain: Eukaryota
- Kingdom: Animalia
- Phylum: Arthropoda
- Class: Insecta
- Order: Orthoptera
- Suborder: Caelifera
- Family: Acrididae
- Subfamily: Oxyinae
- Tribe: Oxyini
- Genus: Oxya; Serville, 1831

Synonyms
- Oxyoides Zheng & Fu, 1994; Zulua Ramme, 1929

= Oxya =

Genus of grasshoppers

Oxya is a genus of grasshoppers (Caelifera: Acrididae) found in Africa and Asia (where some species may be called "rice grasshoppers").

== Species ==
The Orthoptera Species File lists the following:

- Oxya adentata Willemse, 1925
- Oxya agavisa Tsai, 1931
- Oxya anagavisa Bi, 1986
- Oxya apicocingula Ma, Guo & Zheng, 1994
- Oxya bicingula Ma, Guo & Zheng, 1993
- Oxya bolaangensis Hollis, 1971
- Oxya brachyptera Zheng & Huo, 1992
- Oxya chinensis (Thunberg, 1815)
- Oxya cyanipes (Karny, 1907)
- Oxya cyanoptera Stål, 1873
- Oxya dorsigera Burmeister, 1838
- Oxya flavefemura Ma, Guo & Zheng, 1994
- Oxya fuscovittata (Marschall, 1836)
- Oxya glabra (Ramme, 1929)
- Oxya gorakhpurensis Usmani & Shafee, 1985
- Oxya grandis Willemse, 1925
- Oxya guizhouensis Yin, Yin & Zheng, 2008
- Oxya hainanensis Bi, 1986
- Oxya humeralis (Walker, 1870)
- Oxya hyla Serville, 1831 - type species
- Oxya japonica (Thunberg, 1815)
- Oxya luteola (Haan, 1842)
- Oxya manzhurica Bei-Bienko, 1929
- Oxya maoershanensis Zheng & Li, 2001
- Oxya maritima Mishchenko, 1951
- Oxya minuta Carl, 1916
- Oxya multidentata (temporary name) Zheng & Huo, 1999
- Oxya nakaii Furukawa, 1939
- Oxya ningpoensis Chang, 1934
- Oxya nitidula (Walker, 1870)
- Oxya occidentalis Ichikawa, 2001
- Oxya octodentata Zheng & Jiang, 2002
- Oxya ogasawaraensis Ichikawa, 2001
- Oxya oxyura Uvarov, 1953
- Oxya prominenangula Zheng & Shi, 2001
- Oxya rammei Tsai, 1931
- Oxya rikuchuensis Ichikawa, 2001
- Oxya serrulata Krauss, 1890
- Oxya shanghaiensis Willemse, 1925
- Oxya sianensis Zheng, 1964
- Oxya squalida (Marschall, 1836)
- Oxya stresemanni Ramme, 1941
- Oxya termacingula Ma, 1995
- Oxya tridentata Willemse, 1925
- Oxya unistrigata (Haan, 1842)
- Oxya velox (Fabricius, 1787)
- Oxya vicina Brunner von Wattenwyl, 1893
- Oxya yezoensis Shiraki, 1910
- Oxya yunnana Bi, 1986

== Gallery ==
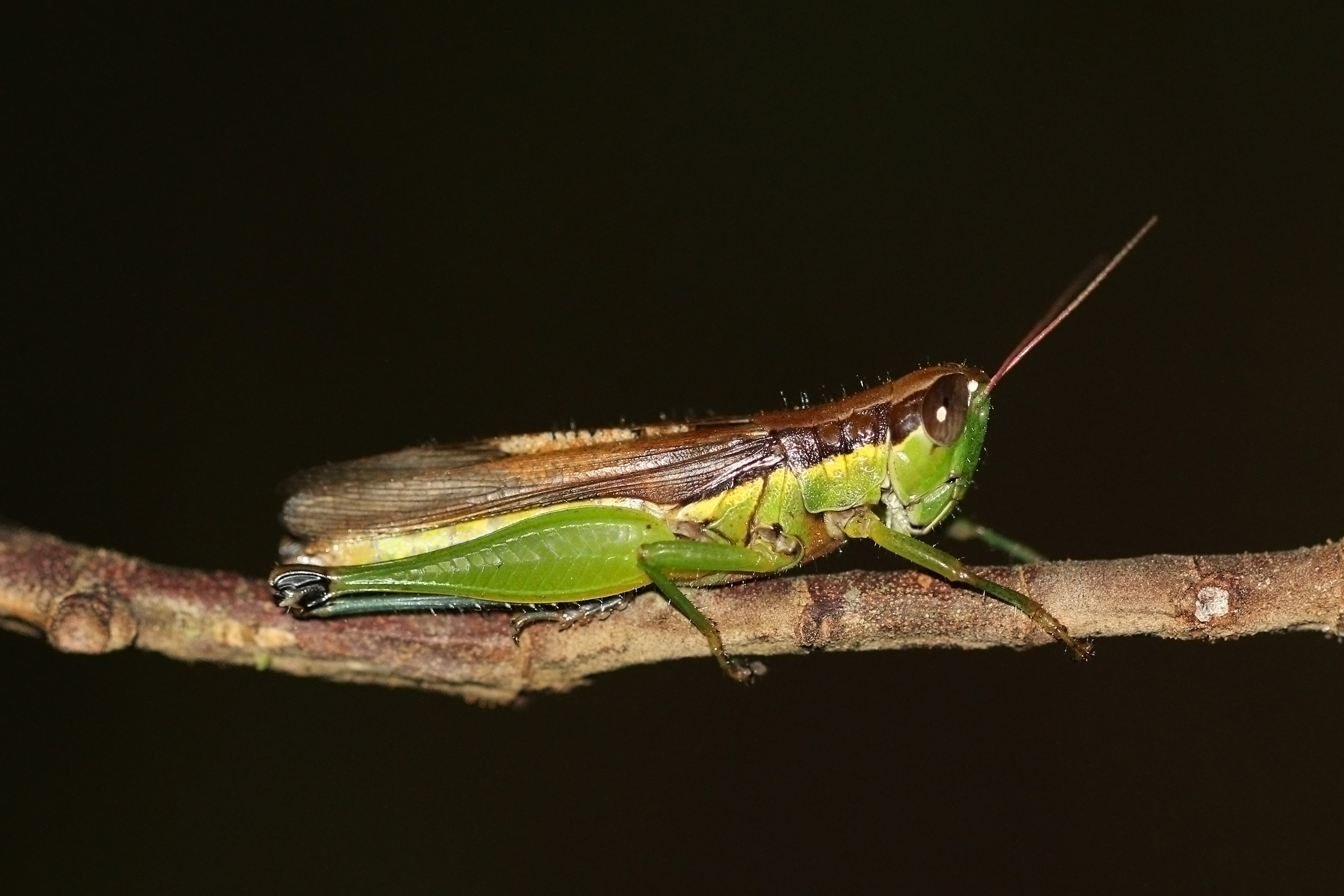
Oxya chinensis

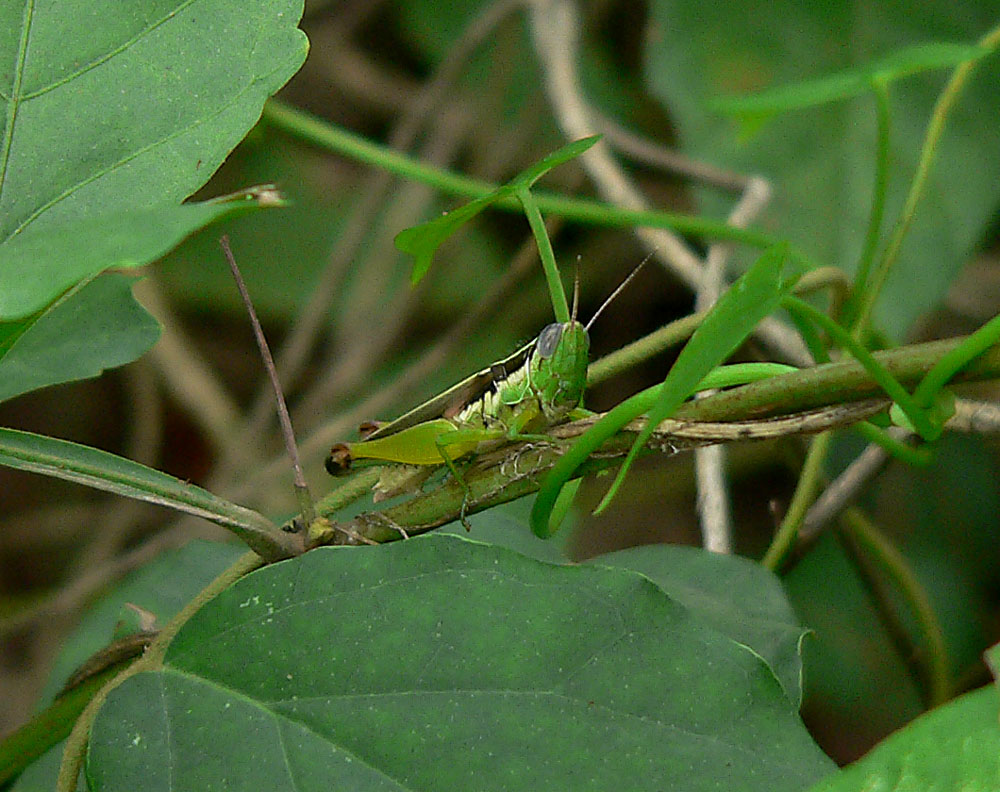
Oxya hyla female, Benin

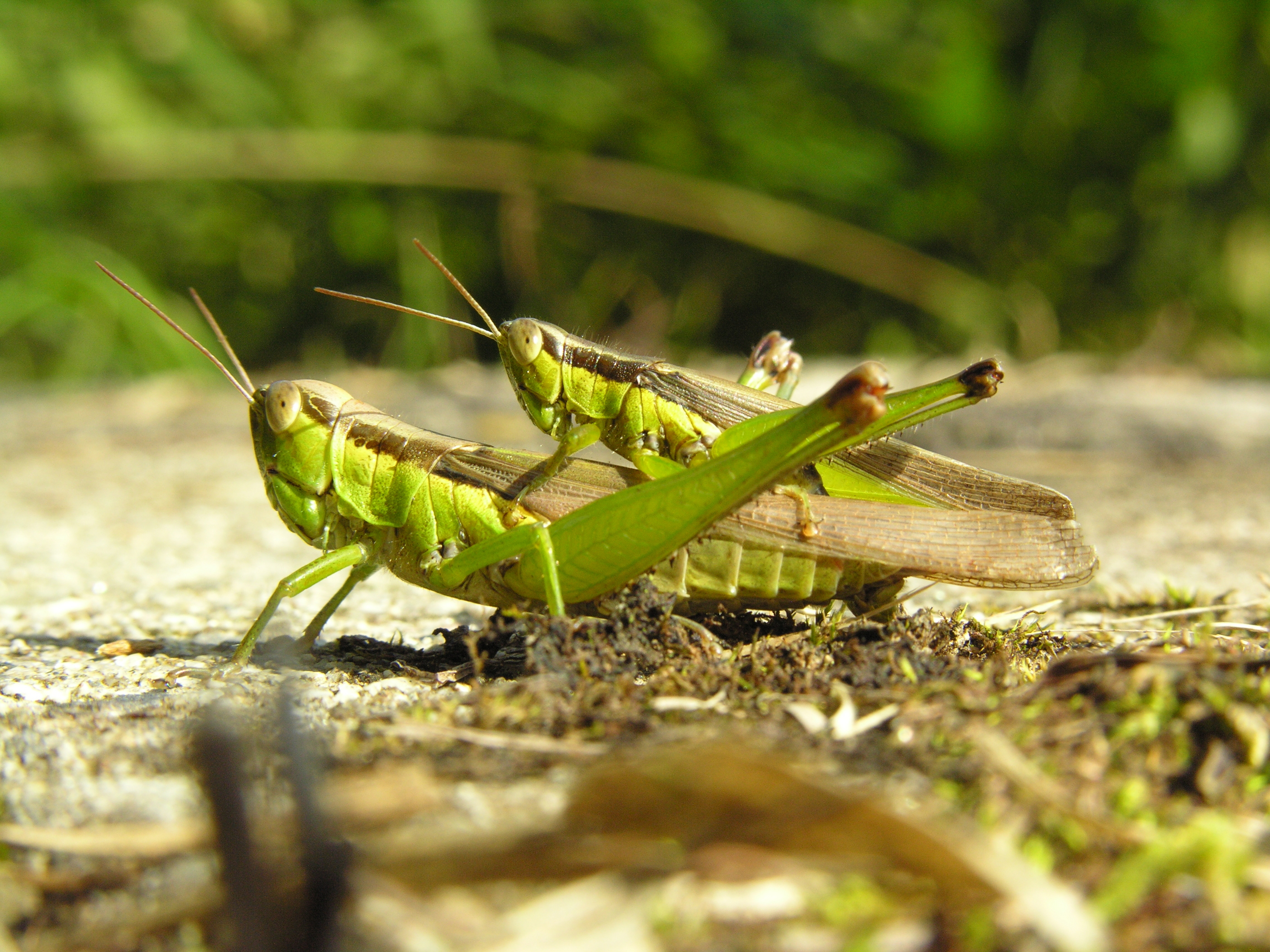
Oxya japonica

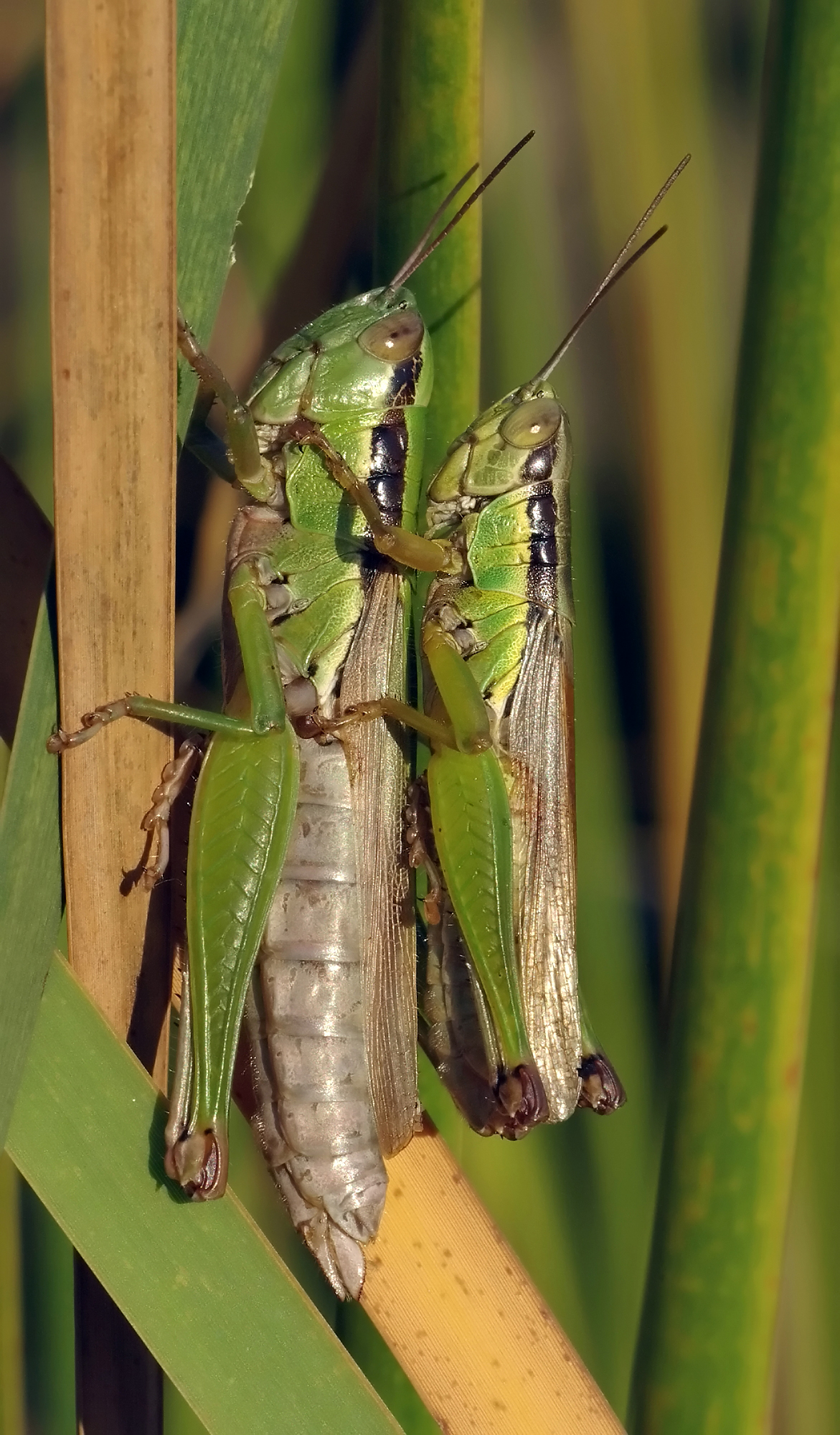
Oxya yezoensis, Japan
