= Sclerospora graminicola =

Scientific classification
- Domain: Eukaryota
- Clade: Sar
- Clade: Stramenopiles
- Phylum: Oomycota
- Class: Peronosporomycetes
- Order: Peronosporales
- Family: Peronosporaceae
- Genus: Sclerospora
- Species: S. graminicola

Binomial name
- Sclerospora graminicola (Sacc.) J. Schröt., (1886)

Synonyms
- Peronospora graminicola Peronospora setariae Protomyces graminicola Sclerospora graminicola var. setariae-italicae Sclerospora setariae-italicae Ustilago urbani

Species of plant pathogen

Sclerospora graminicola is a plant pathogen infecting maize and foxtail and pearl millet. Sclerospora graminicola was originally described by Saccardo in 1879 as Protomyces graminicola from infected Setaria verticillata. Schroeter examined infected Setaria viridis and determined that this species should be placed in a new genus that he named Sclerospora. Sclerospora graminicola primarily infects C4 photosynthetic grasses of the subfamily Panicoideae, possibly due to C4 photosynthesis allowing for a greater complexity of carbohydrate substrates.
