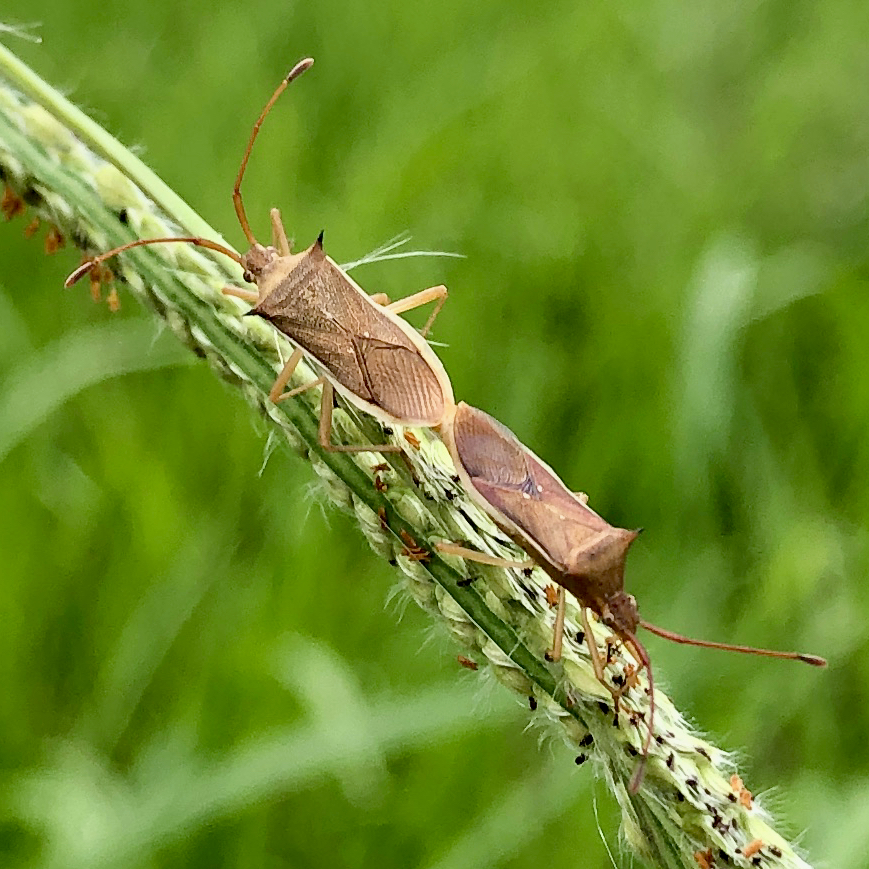
- Two rice stinkbugs mating on a stalk of grass

Scientific classification
- Kingdom: Animalia
- Phylum: Arthropoda
- Class: Insecta
- Order: Hemiptera
- Suborder: Heteroptera
- Family: Coreidae
- Genus: Cletus
- Species: C. punctiger

Binomial name
- Cletus punctiger (Dallas, 1852)

Synonyms
- Gonocerus punctiger

= Cletus punctiger =

Species of true bug

Cletus punctiger, the rice stinkbug, is a species of true bug in the family Coreidae. It is a pest of sorghum and other grass species in India.
