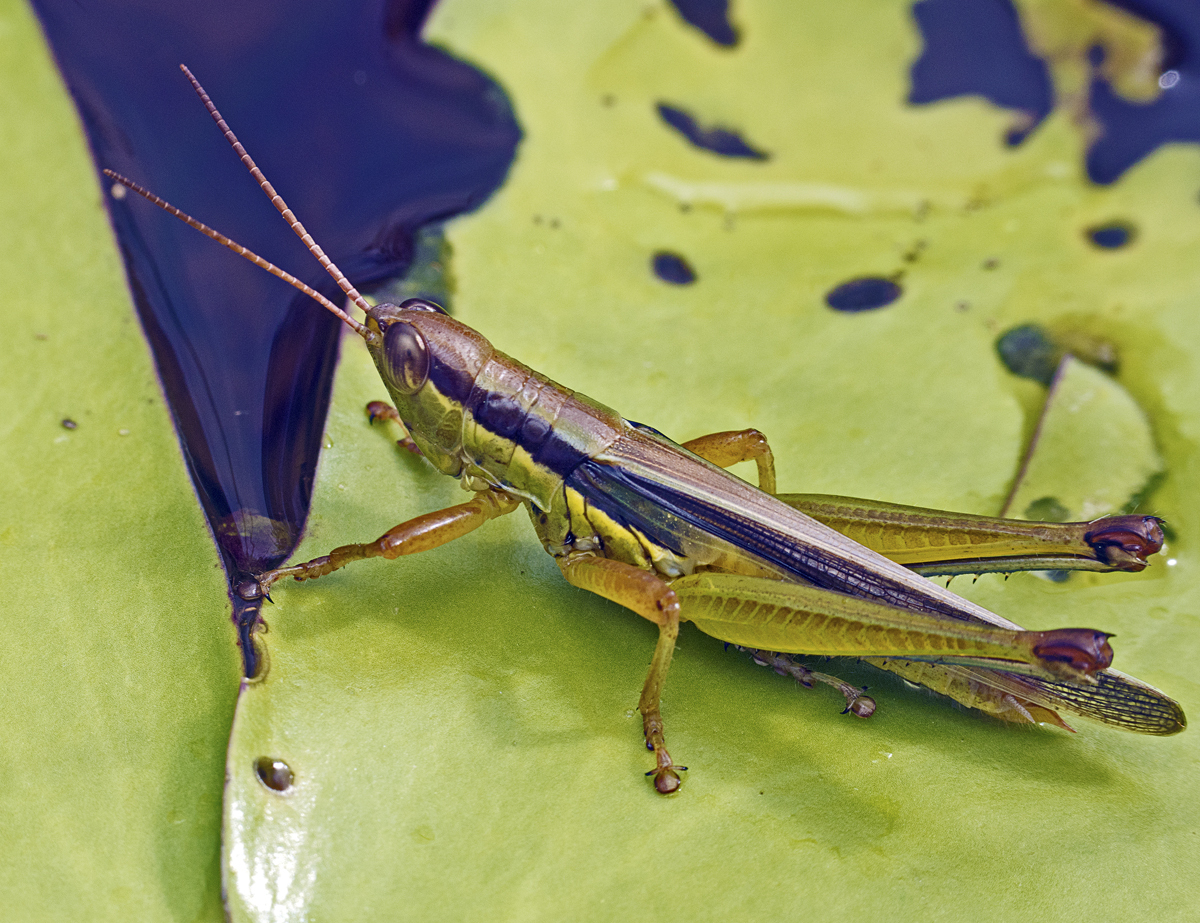
- Bermius odontocercus, Eastern Toothed Bermius, Australia

Scientific classification
- Domain: Eukaryota
- Kingdom: Animalia
- Phylum: Arthropoda
- Class: Insecta
- Order: Orthoptera
- Suborder: Caelifera
- Family: Acrididae
- Subfamily: Oxyinae
- Tribe: Oxyini
- Genus: Bermius
- Species: B. odontocercus

Binomial name
- Bermius odontocercus Stål, 1878

= Bermius odontocercus =

Species of grasshopper

Bermius odontocercus, the eastern toothed bermius, is a species of short-horned grasshopper in the family Acrididae. It is found in Australia. It was first described by Carl Stål in 1878.
