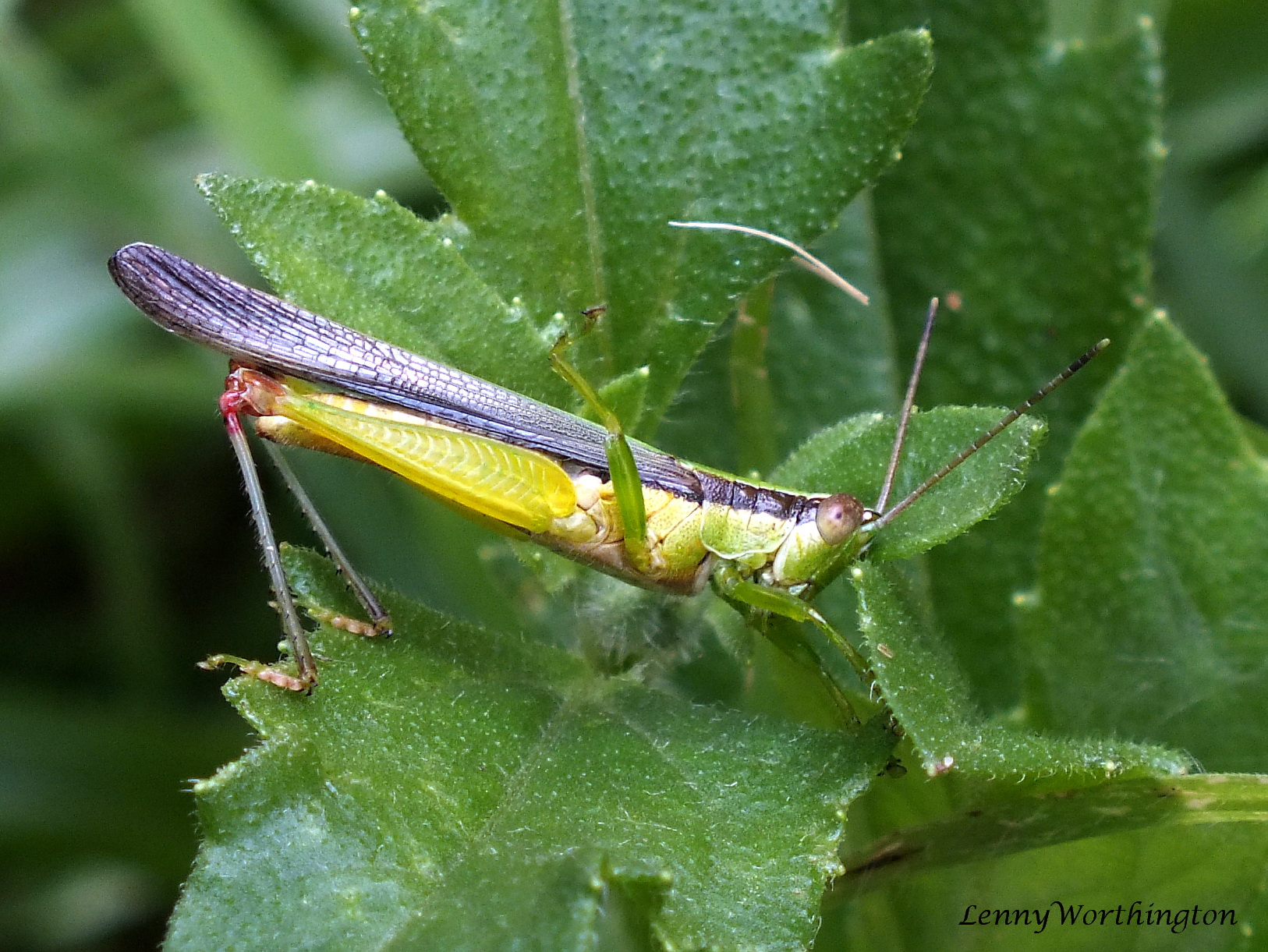
- Gesonula mundata, Thailand

Scientific classification
- Kingdom: Animalia
- Phylum: Arthropoda
- Clade: Pancrustacea
- Class: Insecta
- Order: Orthoptera
- Suborder: Caelifera
- Family: Acrididae
- Subfamily: Oxyinae
- Tribe: Oxyini
- Genus: Gesonula
- Species: G. mundata

Binomial name
- Gesonula mundata (Walker, 1870)

= Gesonula mundata =

Species of grasshopper

Gesonula mundata is a species of short-horned grasshopper in the family Acrididae. It is found in Southeast Asia and Oceania.

== Subspecies ==
These subspecies belong to the species Gesonula mundata:

- Gesonula mundata laosana (Rehn, 1952)
- Gesonula mundata mundata (Walker, 1870) (Common Gesonula)
- Gesonula mundata pulchra (Rehn, 1909)
- Gesonula mundata vietnamensis Storozhenko, 1992
- Gesonula mundata zonocera (Navás, 1904)
