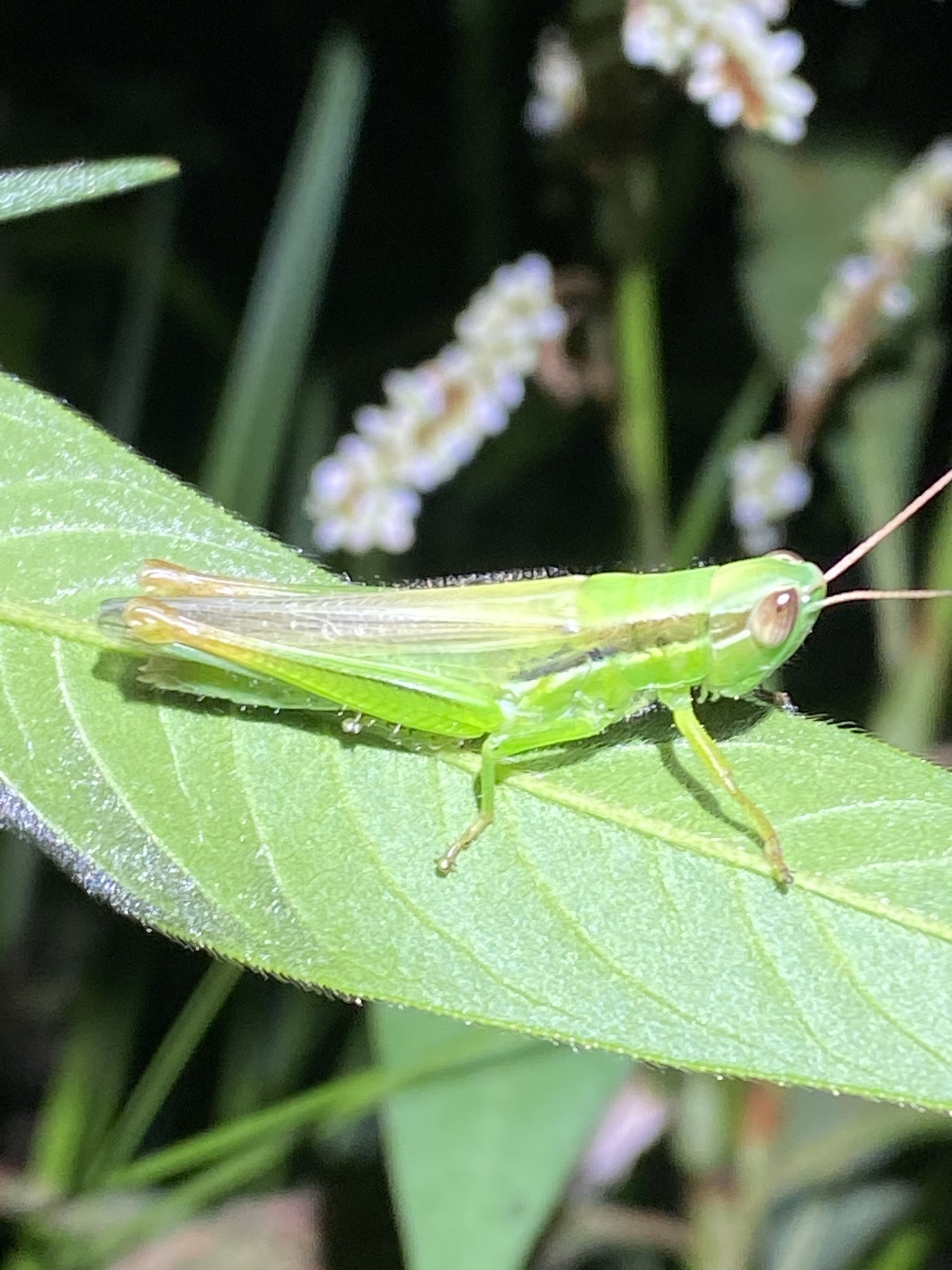
- Bermius brachycerus, Australia

Scientific classification
- Domain: Eukaryota
- Kingdom: Animalia
- Phylum: Arthropoda
- Class: Insecta
- Order: Orthoptera
- Suborder: Caelifera
- Family: Acrididae
- Subfamily: Oxyinae
- Tribe: Oxyini
- Genus: Bermius
- Species: B. brachycerus

Binomial name
- Bermius brachycerus Stål, 1878

= Bermius brachycerus =

Species of grasshopper

Bermius brachycerus is a species of short-horned grasshopper in the family Acrididae. It is found in Australia.

It was first described in 1878 by Carl Stål.

== Subspecies ==
These subspecies belong to the species Bermius brachycerus:

- Bermius brachycerus brachycerus Stål, 1878 (Garden Bermius)
- Bermius brachycerus magistralis Rehn, 1957
- Bermius brachycerus planicola Rehn, 1957
