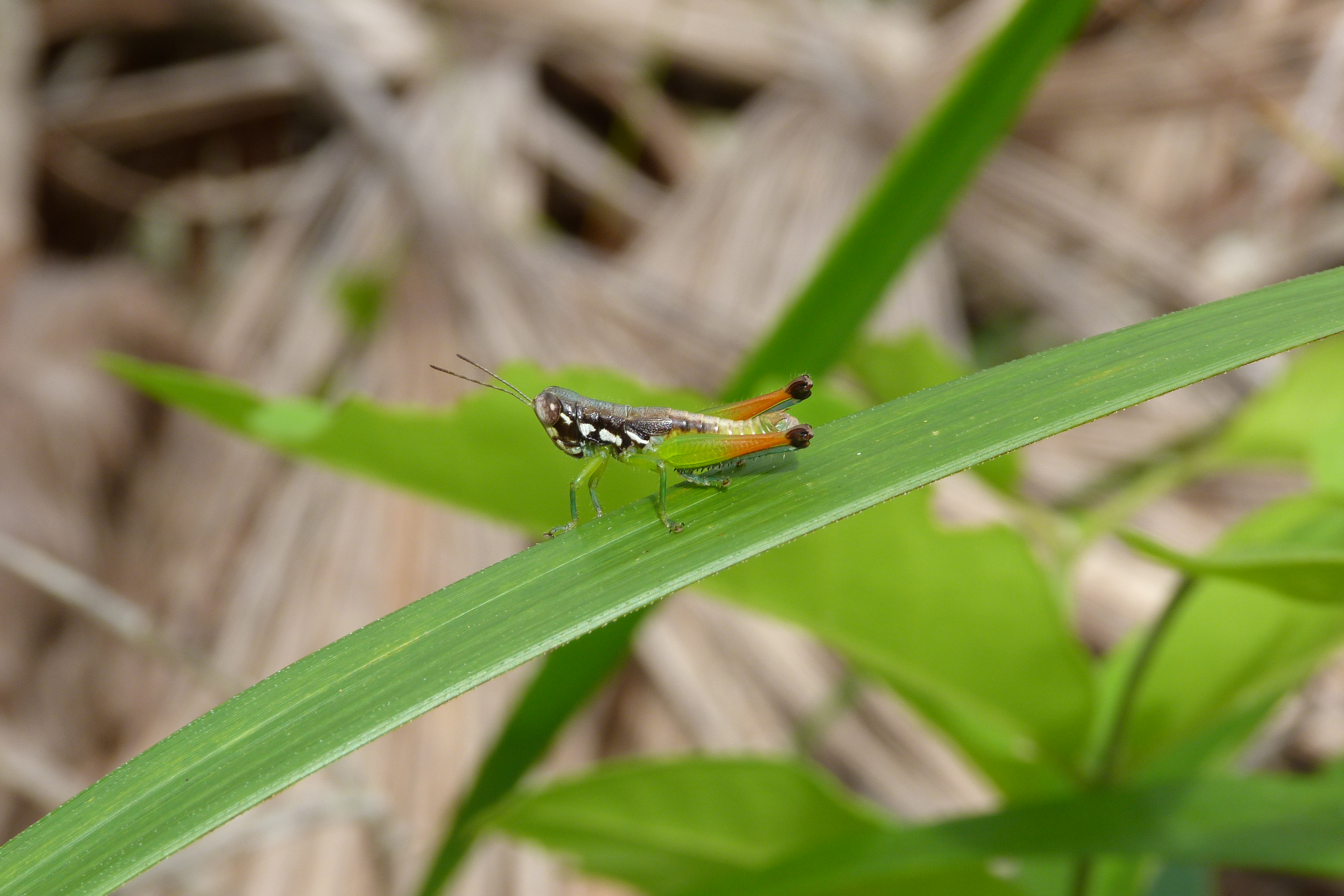
- Methiola picta, red-legged methiola

Scientific classification
- Domain: Eukaryota
- Kingdom: Animalia
- Phylum: Arthropoda
- Class: Insecta
- Order: Orthoptera
- Suborder: Caelifera
- Family: Acrididae
- Subfamily: Oxyinae
- Tribe: Praxibulini
- Genus: Methiola
- Species: M. picta

Binomial name
- Methiola picta Sjöstedt, 1920

= Methiola picta =

Species of short-horned grasshopper

Methiola picta, the red-legged methiola, is a species of short-horned grasshopper in the family, Acrididae. It is found in Australia.

== Subspecies ==
These two subspecies belong to the species Methiola picta:

- Methiola picta gemmata Rehn, 1957
- Methiola picta picta Sjöstedt, 1920
