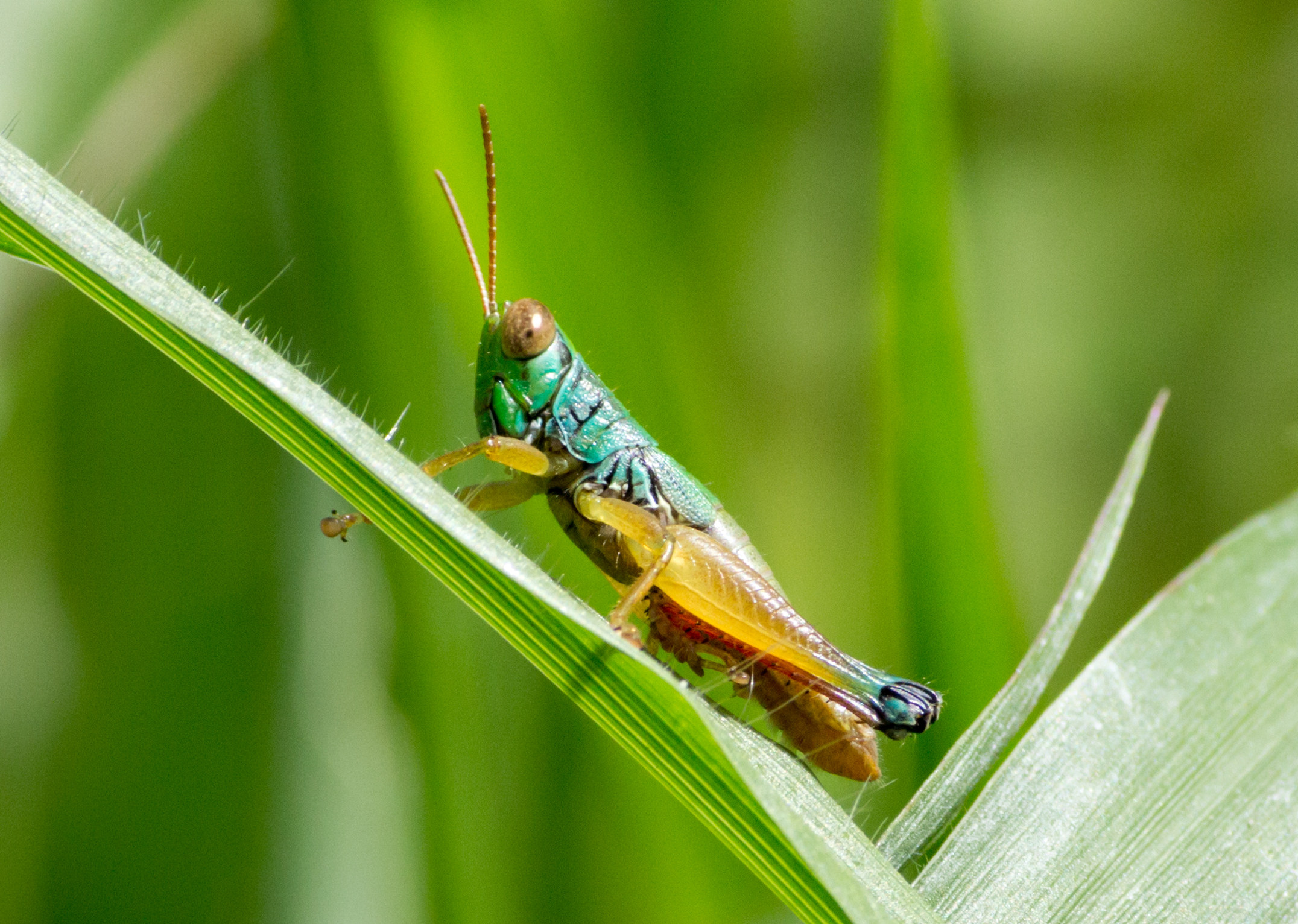
- Caryanda spuria, Indonesia

Scientific classification
- Kingdom: Animalia
- Phylum: Arthropoda
- Clade: Pancrustacea
- Class: Insecta
- Order: Orthoptera
- Suborder: Caelifera
- Family: Acrididae
- Subfamily: Caryandinae
- Genus: Caryanda
- Species: C. spuria

Binomial name
- Caryanda spuria (Stål, 1861)

= Caryanda spuria =

Species of grasshopper

Caryanda spuria is a species of short-horned grasshopper in the family Acrididae. It is found mainly in Indonesia, Singapore, and Malaysia.
