= Caryanda modesta =

Scientific classification
- Domain: Eukaryota
- Kingdom: Animalia
- Phylum: Arthropoda
- Class: Insecta
- Order: Orthoptera
- Suborder: Caelifera
- Family: Acrididae
- Subfamily: Caryandinae
- Genus: Caryanda
- Species: C. modesta

Binomial name
- Caryanda modesta (Giglio-Tos, 1907)

Synonyms
- Caryanda elegans (Bolívar, 1911); Caryanda major (Bolívar, 1908); Caryanda viridis (Bolívar, 1908); Dibastica modesta Giglio-Tos, 1907

Species of grasshopper

Caryanda modesta is a species of grasshoppers in the subfamily Caryandinae, found in the Congo Basin.
