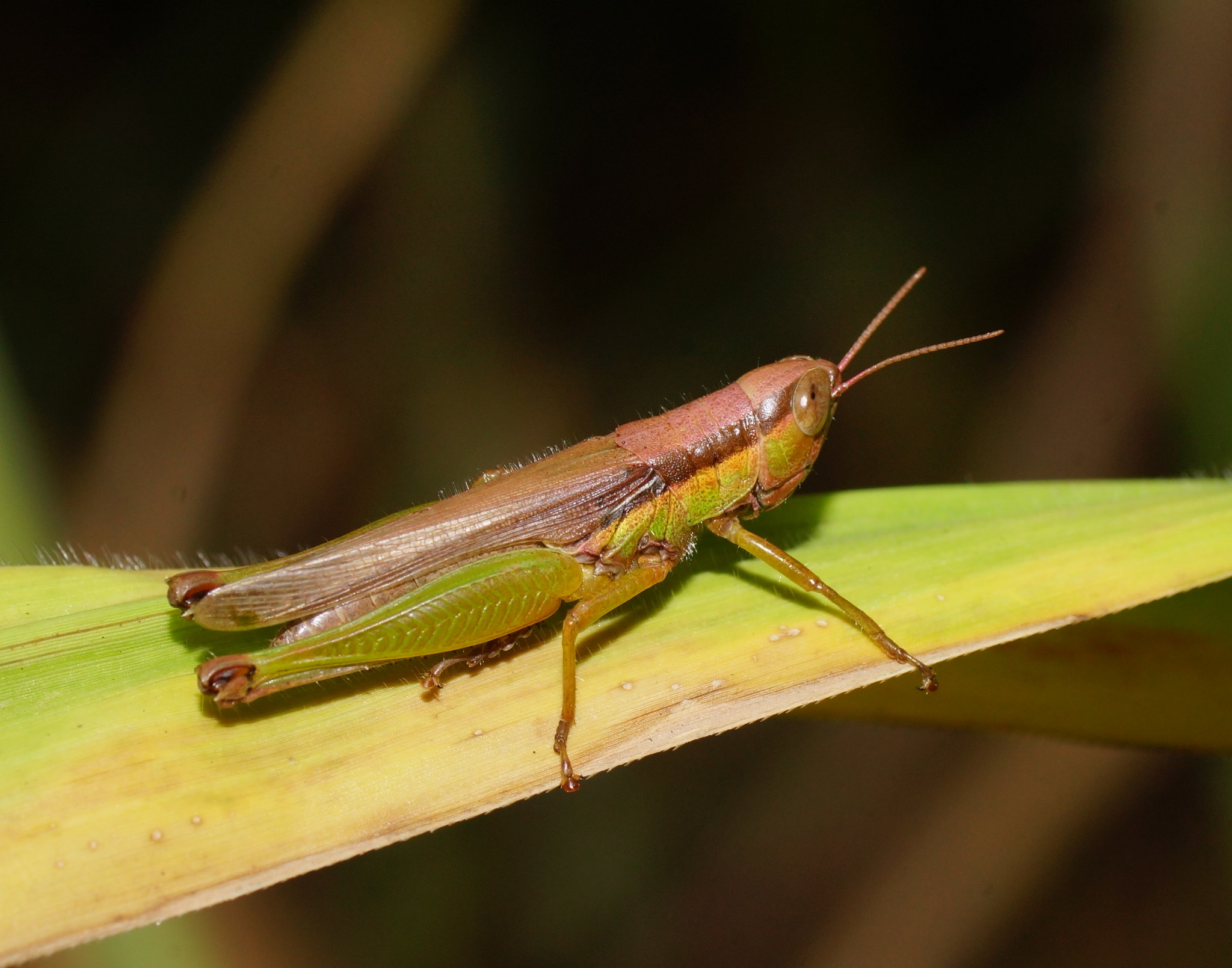

Scientific classification
- Kingdom: Animalia
- Phylum: Arthropoda
- Clade: Pancrustacea
- Class: Insecta
- Order: Orthoptera
- Suborder: Caelifera
- Family: Acrididae
- Subfamily: Oxyinae
- Tribe: Oxyini
- Genus: Bermiella; Bolivar, 1912

= Bermiella =

Genus of grasshoppers

Bermiella is a genus of short-horned grasshopper in the family Acrididae. It is found mostly in Top End Australian savannas near watercourses and billabongs etc.
