= Cercina (grasshopper) =

Scientific classification
- Kingdom: Animalia
- Phylum: Arthropoda
- Clade: Pancrustacea
- Class: Insecta
- Order: Orthoptera
- Suborder: Caelifera
- Family: Acrididae
- Subfamily: Caryandinae
- Genus: Cercina; Stål, 1878

Synonyms
- Cledra Bolívar, 1918

Genus of grasshoppers

External image
- Image at iNaturalist

Cercina is a genus of Asian grasshoppers in the subfamily Caryandinae (it was placed previously in the Oxyinae) first described by Carl Stål (1833–1878), a Swedish entomologist. Species records (probably incomplete) are from Sri Lanka, Nepal and Thailand.

Species include:

1. Cercina mussoriensis Prasad & Sinha, 1956
2. Cercina obtusa Stål, 1878 - type species
3. Cercina phillipsi Henry, 1933
