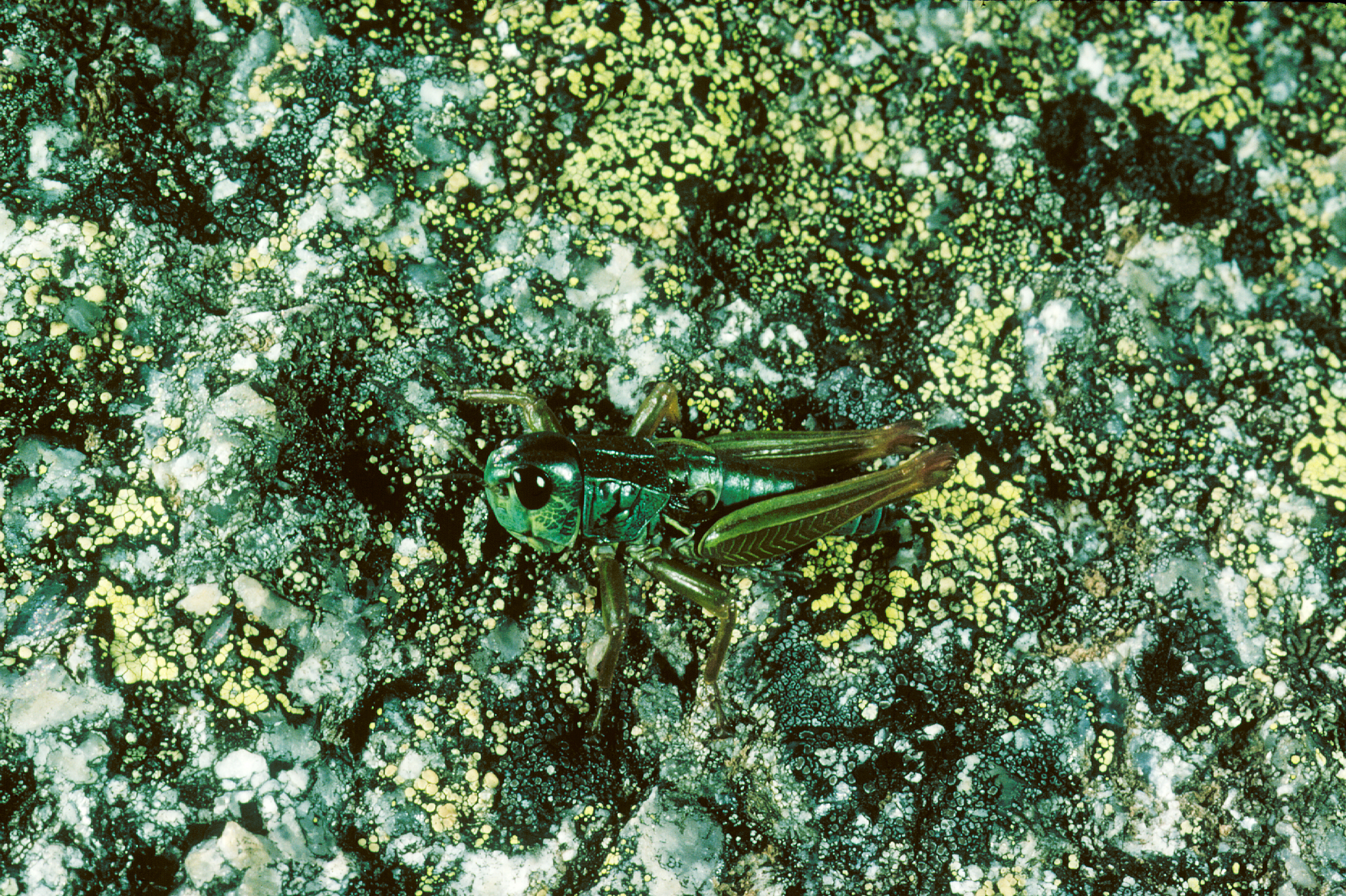
- Kosciuscola tristis, chameleon grasshopper, Australia

Conservation status
- Endangered (IUCN 3.1) (K. tristis)

- Critically Endangered (IUCN 3.1) (K. restrictus)

Scientific classification
- Domain: Eukaryota
- Kingdom: Animalia
- Phylum: Arthropoda
- Class: Insecta
- Order: Orthoptera
- Suborder: Caelifera
- Family: Acrididae
- Subfamily: Oxyinae
- Tribe: Praxibulini
- Genus: Kosciuscola
- Species: K. tristis

Binomial name
- Kosciuscola tristis Sjöstedt, 1934

= Kosciuscola tristis =

Species of grasshopper

Kosciuscola tristis, known generally as the chameleon skyhopper, is a species of short-horned grasshopper in the family Acrididae. It is found in Australia.

== Subspecies ==
These subspecies belong to the species Kosciuscola tristis:

- Kosciuscola tristis restrictus Rehn, 1957
- Kosciuscola tristis tristis Sjöstedt, 1934 (Chameleon Grasshopper)
