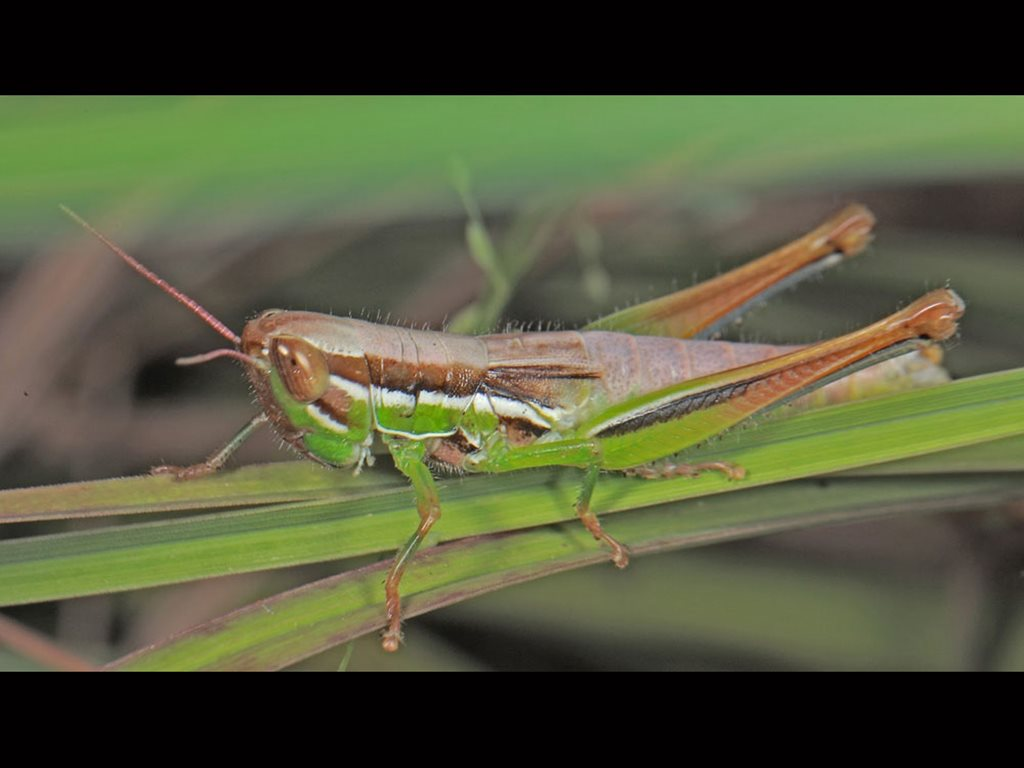

Scientific classification
- Domain: Eukaryota
- Kingdom: Animalia
- Phylum: Arthropoda
- Class: Insecta
- Order: Orthoptera
- Suborder: Caelifera
- Family: Acrididae
- Subfamily: Oxyinae
- Tribe: Oxyini
- Genus: Tolgadia; Stal 1878

= Tolgadia =

Genus of grasshoppers

Tolgadia is a genus of short-horned grasshopper in the family Acrididae. It is found in north Australian savanna forest and woodland sites. The genus includes:

- Tolgadia bivittata (Sjöstedt, 1920)
- Tolgadia infirma (Stål, 1878)
