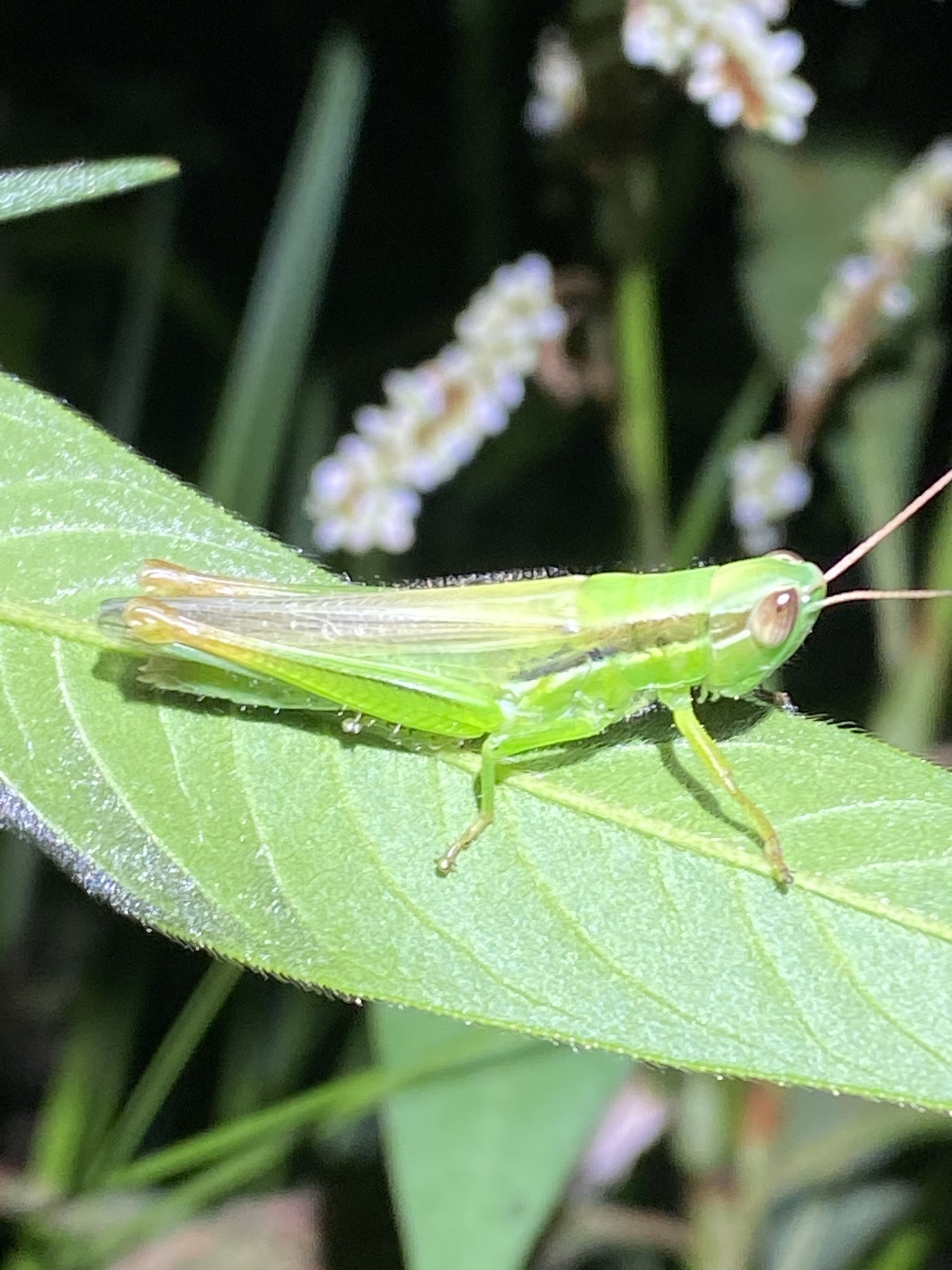
- Bermius brachycerus, Australia

Scientific classification
- Kingdom: Animalia
- Phylum: Arthropoda
- Clade: Pancrustacea
- Class: Insecta
- Order: Orthoptera
- Suborder: Caelifera
- Family: Acrididae
- Subfamily: Oxyinae
- Tribe: Oxyini
- Genus: Bermius; Stål, 1878

= Bermius =

Genus of grasshoppers

Bermius is a genus of short-horned grasshoppers in the family Acrididae. There are at least four described species in Bermius, found in Australia.

== Species ==
These species belong to the genus Bermius:

- Bermius brachycerus Stål, 1878
- Bermius buntamurra Rehn, 1957
- Bermius curvicercus Sjöstedt, 1921 (Sorghum Bermius)
- Bermius odontocercus Stål, 1878 (Eastern Toothed Bermius)
