= Chitaura elegans =

Scientific classification
- Domain: Eukaryota
- Kingdom: Animalia
- Phylum: Arthropoda
- Class: Insecta
- Order: Orthoptera
- Suborder: Caelifera
- Family: Acrididae
- Subfamily: Oxyinae
- Genus: Chitaura
- Species: C. elegans

Binomial name
- Chitaura elegans Ramme, 1941

Species of grasshopper

Chitaura elegans is a species of grasshopper found in Indo-Malaysia.

Two subspecies are recognized:

- Chitaura elegans diluta Ramme, 1941
- Chitaura elegans elegans Ramme, 1941
