= Caryanda neoelegans =

Scientific classification
- Domain: Eukaryota
- Kingdom: Animalia
- Phylum: Arthropoda
- Class: Insecta
- Order: Orthoptera
- Suborder: Caelifera
- Family: Acrididae
- Subfamily: Caryandinae
- Genus: Caryanda
- Species: C. neoelegans

Binomial name
- Caryanda neoelegans Otte, 1995

Synonyms
- Caryanda elegans Bolívar, 1918; Caryanda guangxiensis (Zheng & Ren, 2007)

Species of grasshopper

Caryanda neoelegans is a species of grasshoppers in the subfamily Caryandinae, found in Indochina and eastern China.

External image
- Images at iNaturalist
