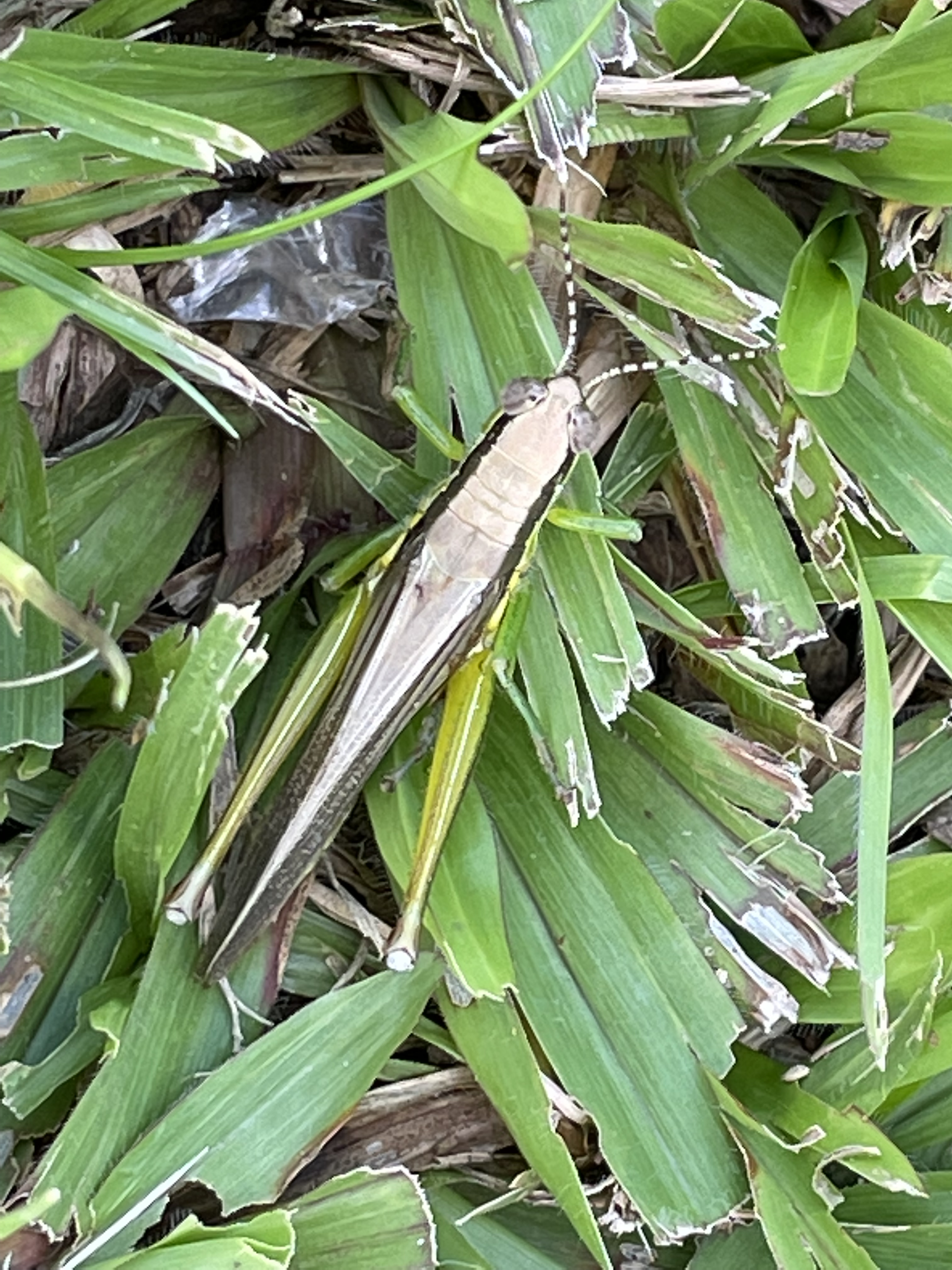

Scientific classification
- Domain: Eukaryota
- Kingdom: Animalia
- Phylum: Arthropoda
- Class: Insecta
- Order: Orthoptera
- Suborder: Caelifera
- Family: Acrididae
- Subfamily: Oxyinae
- Tribe: Oxyini
- Genus: Daperria; Sjöstedt, 1921

= Daperria =

Genus of grasshoppers

Deperria is a genus of short-horned grasshoppers in the family Acrididae. It is a common genus in the north Australian savannas found around freshwater creeks and billabongs during the wet season.

== Species ==
These species belong to the genus Deperria:

- Daperria accola
- Daperria bermioides
