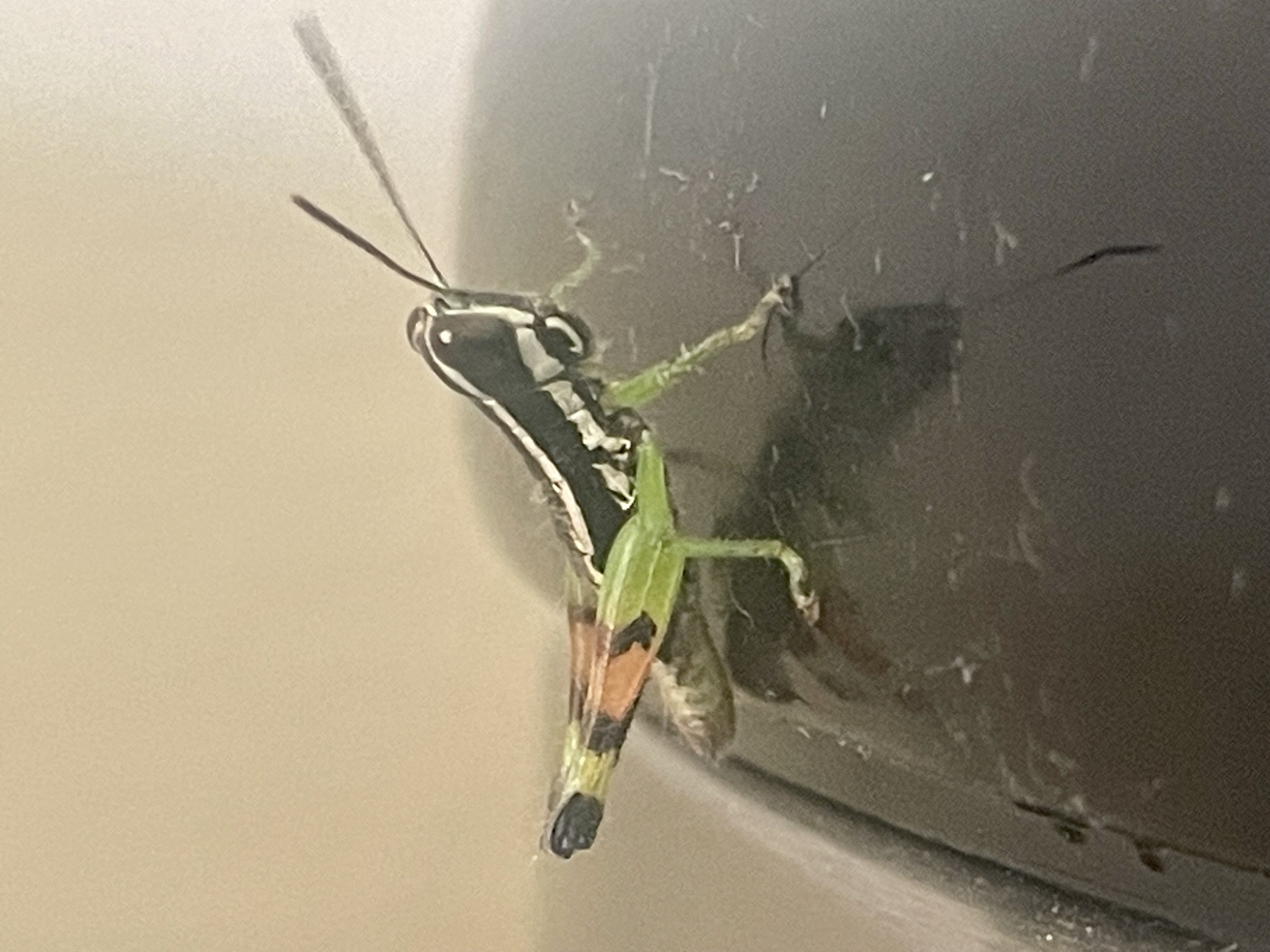

Scientific classification
- Domain: Eukaryota
- Kingdom: Animalia
- Phylum: Arthropoda
- Class: Insecta
- Order: Orthoptera
- Suborder: Caelifera
- Family: Acrididae
- Subfamily: Oxyinae
- Genus: Chitaura
- Species: C. indica

Binomial name
- Chitaura indica Uvarov, 1929

= Chitaura indica =

Species of grasshopper

Chitaura indica is a species of grasshopper found in South India. It was described by Boris Uvarov in 1929 based on specimens collected from Siddapura in the Karnataka part of the Western Ghats. Despite his original paper introduction mentioning that the holotype of this species along with nine other described by him in the paper was deposited in Natural History Museum of Geneva collections, it was the paratype that was actually deposited in the Geneva collections.
