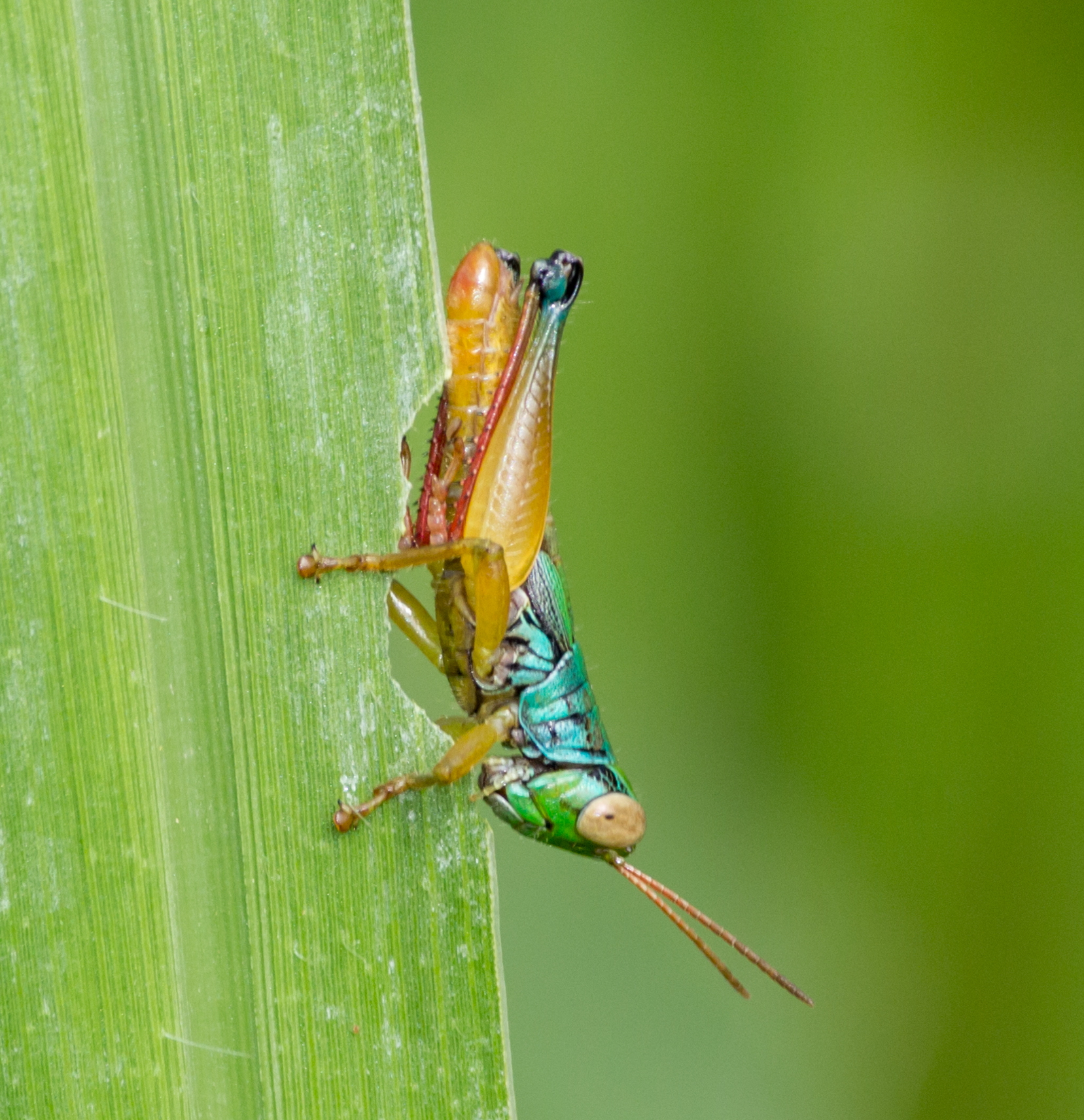
- Caryanda spuria in Umbulharjo, Indonesia

Scientific classification
- Domain: Eukaryota
- Kingdom: Animalia
- Phylum: Arthropoda
- Class: Insecta
- Order: Orthoptera
- Suborder: Caelifera
- Family: Acrididae
- Subfamily: Caryandinae
- Genus: Caryanda; Stål, 1878

Synonyms
- List: Austenia Ramme, 1929; Austeniella Ramme, 1931; Dibastica Giglio-Tos, 1907; Garyanda Wang & Zheng, 2000; Qinshuiacris Zheng & Mao, 1996; Sinocaryanda Mao & Ren, 2007; Tszacris Tinkham, 1940

= Caryanda (grasshopper) =

Genus of grasshoppers

External image
- Image of C. zheminzhengi at flickr

Caryanda is a large genus of grasshoppers in the subfamily Caryandinae (it was placed previously in the tribe Oxyini). Species are recorded from Africa and Asia (India, China, Indo-China, through to New Guinea).

== Species ==
The Orthoptera Species File lists:

species group amplexicerca Ou, Liu & Zheng, 2007

1. Caryanda amplexicerca Ou, Liu & Zheng, 2007
2. Caryanda cyanonota Mao & Li, 2015
3. Caryanda shuangjinga Mao & Li, 2015

species group aurata Mao, Ren & Ou, 2007

1. Caryanda aurata Mao, Ren & Ou, 2007
2. Caryanda colourfula Mao, Ren & Ou, 2011
3. Caryanda nigrotibia Mao, Xu & Li, 2017
4. Caryanda zhenyuanensis Mao, Xu & Li, 2017

species group dentata Mao & Ou, 2006

1. Caryanda cyclata Zheng, 2008
2. Caryanda dentata Mao & Ou, 2006
3. Caryanda jiangchenga Mao, Niu & Zheng, 2015

species group nigrospina Mao, Ren & Ou, 2011

1. Caryanda caesinota Mao & Li, 2016
2. Caryanda heterochromia Mao & Huang, 2016
3. Caryanda nigrospina Mao, Ren & Ou, 2011

species group viridis (Zheng & Mao, 1996)

1. Caryanda albomaculata Mao, Ren & Ou, 2007
2. Caryanda dehongensis Mao, Xu & Yang, 2003
3. Caryanda eshana Mao, 2015
4. Caryanda viridis (Zheng & Mao, 1996)
5. Caryanda viridoides Mao, Ren & Ou, 2011

species group not assigned

1. Caryanda albufurcula Zheng, 1988
2. Caryanda amplipenna Lian & Zheng, 1989
3. Caryanda atrogeniculata Zheng, Lin, Deng & Shi, 2015
4. Caryanda azurea Gorochov & Storozhenko, 1994
5. Caryanda badongensis Wang, 1995
6. Caryanda bambusa Liu & Yin, 1987
7. Caryanda beybienkoi Storozhenko, 2005
8. Caryanda brachyceraea Li, 2006
9. Caryanda byrrhofemura Zheng & Zhong, 2005
10. Caryanda cachara (Kirby, 1914)
11. Caryanda cultricerca Ou, Liu & Zheng, 2007
12. Caryanda curvimargina Zheng & Ma, 1999
13. Caryanda cylindrica (Ramme, 1929)
14. Caryanda damingshana Zheng & Li, 2001
15. Caryanda flavomaculata Bolívar, 1918
16. Caryanda fujianensis Zheng, 1996
17. Caryanda glauca Li, Ji & Lin, 1985
18. Caryanda gracilis Liu & Yin, 1987
19. Caryanda guangxiensis Li, Lu, Jiang & Meng, 1995
20. Caryanda gulinensis Zheng, Shi & Chen, 1994
21. Caryanda gyirongensis Huang, 1981
22. Caryanda haii (Tinkham, 1940)
23. Caryanda hubeiensis Wang, 1995
24. Caryanda hunana Liu & Yin, 1987
25. Caryanda jinpingensis Mao, Ren & Ou, 2011
26. Caryanda jinzhongshanensis Jiang & Zheng, 1995
27. Caryanda jiulianshana Fu & Zheng, 2003
28. Caryanda jiuyishana Fu & Zheng, 2000
29. Caryanda lancangensis Zheng, 1982
30. Caryanda longhushanensis Li, Lu & You, 1996
31. Caryanda macrocercusa (Mao & Ren, 2007)
32. Caryanda maguanensis Mao, Ren & Ou, 2011
33. Caryanda methiola Chang, 1939
34. Caryanda miaoershana Fu, Zheng & Huang, 2002
35. Caryanda microdentata Fu, Huang & Zheng, 2006
36. Caryanda modesta (Giglio-Tos, 1907)
37. Caryanda neoelegans Otte, 1995
38. Caryanda nigrolineata Liang, 1987
39. Caryanda nigrovittata Lian & Zheng, 1989
40. Caryanda obtusidentata Fu & Zheng, 2004
41. Caryanda olivacea Willemse, 1955
42. Caryanda omeiensis Chang, 1939
43. Caryanda palawana (Ramme, 1941)
44. Caryanda paravicina (Willemse, 1925)
45. Caryanda pelioncerca Zheng & Jiang, 2002
46. Caryanda phippsi Roy & Mestre, 2020
47. Caryanda pieli Chang, 1939
48. Caryanda platycerca Willemse, 1924
49. Caryanda platyvertica Yin, 1980
50. Caryanda prominemargina Xie & Zheng, 1993
51. Caryanda pulchra Brancsik, 1897
52. Caryanda pumila Willemse, 1924
53. Caryanda quadrata Bi & Xia, 1984
54. Caryanda quadridenta Feng, Fu & Zheng, 2005
55. Caryanda rufofemorata Ma & Zheng, 1992
56. Caryanda sanguineoannulata Brunner von Wattenwyl, 1893
57. Caryanda spuria (Stål, 1861) - type species (as Acridium spurium Stål)
58. Caryanda tamdaoensis Storozhenko, 1992
59. Caryanda tridentata Fu, Peng & Zhu, 1994
60. Caryanda triodonta Fu & Zheng, 1994
61. Caryanda triodontoides Meng & Xi, 2008
62. Caryanda virida Ma, Guo & Zheng, 2000
63. Caryanda vittata Li & Jin, 1984
64. Caryanda wulingshana Fu & Zheng, 1994
65. Caryanda xinpingensis Mao, 2017
66. Caryanda xuefengshanensis Fu & Zheng, 2002
67. Caryanda yangmingshana Fu & Zheng, 2003
68. Caryanda yuanbaoshanensis Li, Lu & Jiang, 1995
69. Caryanda yunnana Zheng, 1981
70. Caryanda zhejiangensis Wang & Zheng, 2000
71. Caryanda zheminzhengi Storozhenko, 2021
