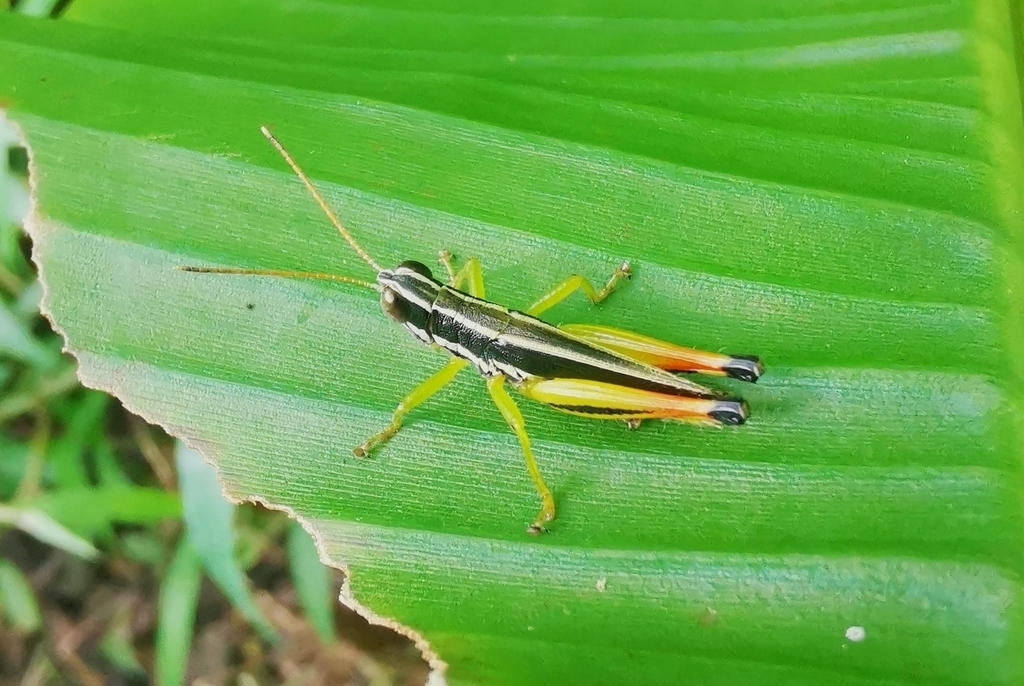
- Oxytauchira brachyptera

Scientific classification
- Domain: Eukaryota
- Kingdom: Animalia
- Phylum: Arthropoda
- Class: Insecta
- Order: Orthoptera
- Suborder: Caelifera
- Family: Acrididae
- Subfamily: Oxyinae
- Genus: Oxytauchira; Ramme, 1941

Synonyms
- Sinstauchira Zheng, 1981

= Oxytauchira =

Genus of grasshoppers

Oxytauchira is a genus of grasshoppers (Acrididae) in the subfamily Oxyinae. The known (probably incomplete) distribution of species is: India, southern China, Indochina, Java and Sulawesi.

== Species ==
The Orthoptera Species File lists:

- Oxytauchira amaculata Mao, Ren & Ou, 2011
- Oxytauchira aspinosa Ingrisch, 1989
- Oxytauchira aurora (Brunner von Wattenwyl, 1893)
- Oxytauchira bilobata Ingrisch, 1989
- Oxytauchira brachyptera Zheng, 1981
- Oxytauchira elegans Willemse, 1965
- Oxytauchira flange Mao, Ren & Ou, 2011
- Oxytauchira gracilis (Willemse, 1931) - type species (as Tauchira gracilis Willemse, C)
- Oxytauchira gressitti (Tinkham, 1940)
- Oxytauchira hui (Li, Lu, Jiang & Meng, 1995)
- Oxytauchira jaintia Ingrisch, Willemse & Shishodia, 2004
- Oxytauchira oxyelegans Otte, 1995
- Oxytauchira paraurora Mao, Ren & Ou, 2011
- Oxytauchira puerensis (Li, Xu & Zheng, 2014)
- Oxytauchira pui (Liang & Zheng, 1986)
- Oxytauchira rohilla Mobin & Usmani, 2019
- Oxytauchira ruficornis (Huang, 1985)
- Oxytauchira truncata Kumar & Chandra, 2018
- Oxytauchira yaoshanensis (Li, 1987)
- Oxytauchira yunnana (Zheng, 1981)
