= Lemba (grasshopper) =

Scientific classification
- Kingdom: Animalia
- Phylum: Arthropoda
- Clade: Pancrustacea
- Class: Insecta
- Order: Orthoptera
- Suborder: Caelifera
- Family: Acrididae
- Subfamily: Caryandinae
- Genus: Lemba; Huang, 1983

Genus of grasshoppers

Lemba is a genus of grasshoppers in the subfamily Caryandinae, erected by C. Huang in 1983. As of August 2026, species records are mostly from southern China (type species found in Yunnan) and N.E. India (L. motinagar in Meghalaya).

== Species ==
The Orthoptera Species File includes:

1. Lemba bituberculata Yin & Liu, 1987
2. Lemba daguanensis Huang, 1983 - type species
3. Lemba guizhouensis Yin, Zhang & You, 2013
4. Lemba motinagar Ingrisch, Willemse & Shishodia, 2004
5. Lemba sichuanensis Ma, Guo & Li, 1994
6. Lemba sinensis (Chang, 1939)
7. Lemba viriditibia Niu & Zheng, 1992
8. Lemba wushanensis Yin, Shen & Yin, 2020
9. Lemba yunnana Ma & Zheng, 1994
10. Lemba zhengi Li, 1994
