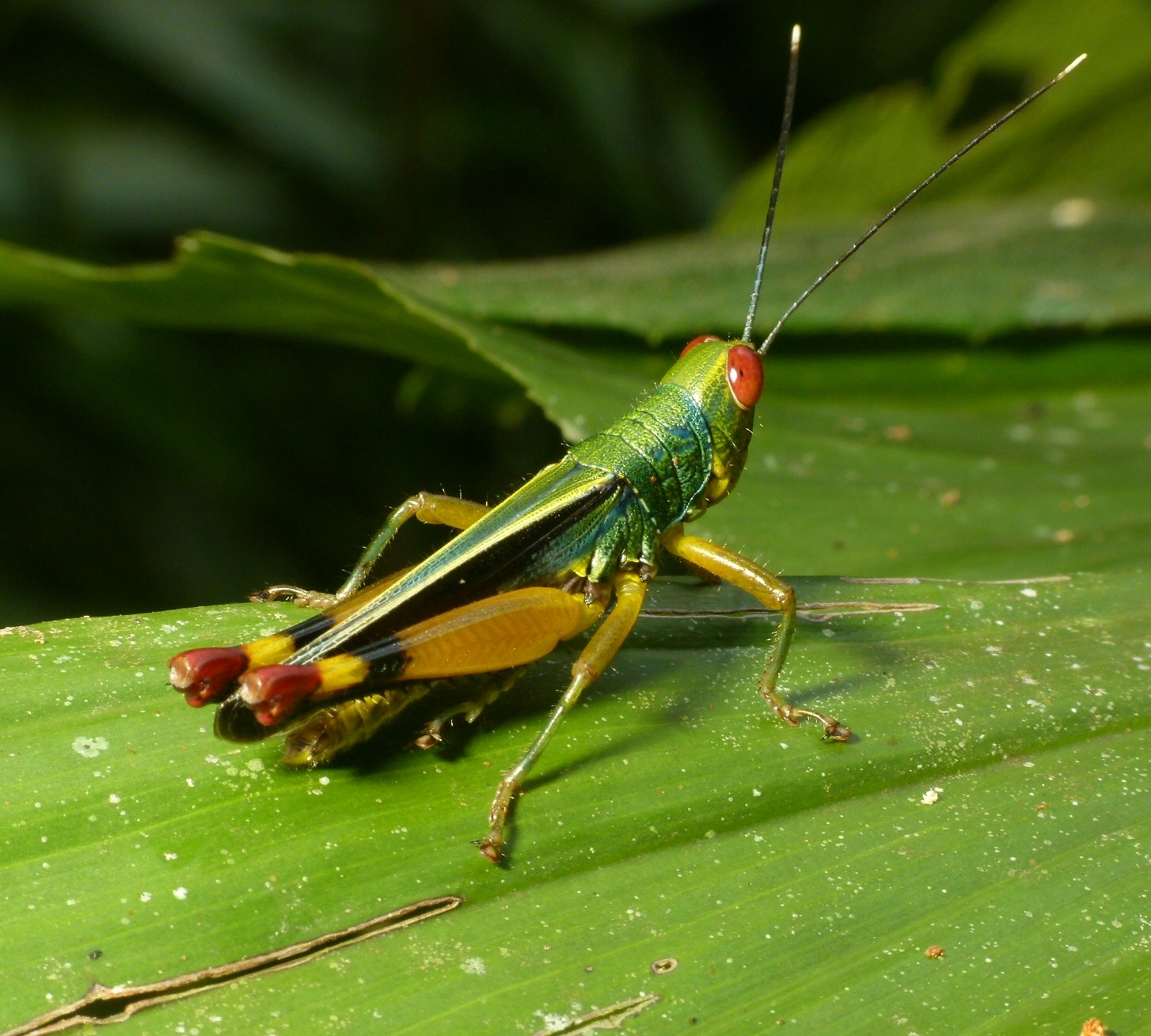
- Thanmoia sp., Vietnam

Scientific classification
- Kingdom: Animalia
- Phylum: Arthropoda
- Clade: Pancrustacea
- Class: Insecta
- Order: Orthoptera
- Suborder: Caelifera
- Family: Acrididae
- Subfamily: Oxyinae
- Tribe: Oxyini
- Genus: Thanmoia; Ramme, 1941

Synonyms
- Annamacris Willemse, 1957; Oxyacris Willemse, 1957

= Thanmoia =

Genus of grasshoppers

Thanmoia is a genus of grasshoppers in the subfamily Oxyinae, erected by Willy Ramme in 1940. Species have been recorded from Vietnam and S.E. China.

== Species ==
The Orthoptera Species File lists the following:

1. Thanmoia ceracrifucosa Storozhenko, 1992
2. Thanmoia gustavi Ramme, 1941 - type species
3. Thanmoia maculata Willemse, 1957
4. Thanmoia olivacea Willemse, 1957
5. Thanmoia reticulipennis (Li & Jin, 1984)
