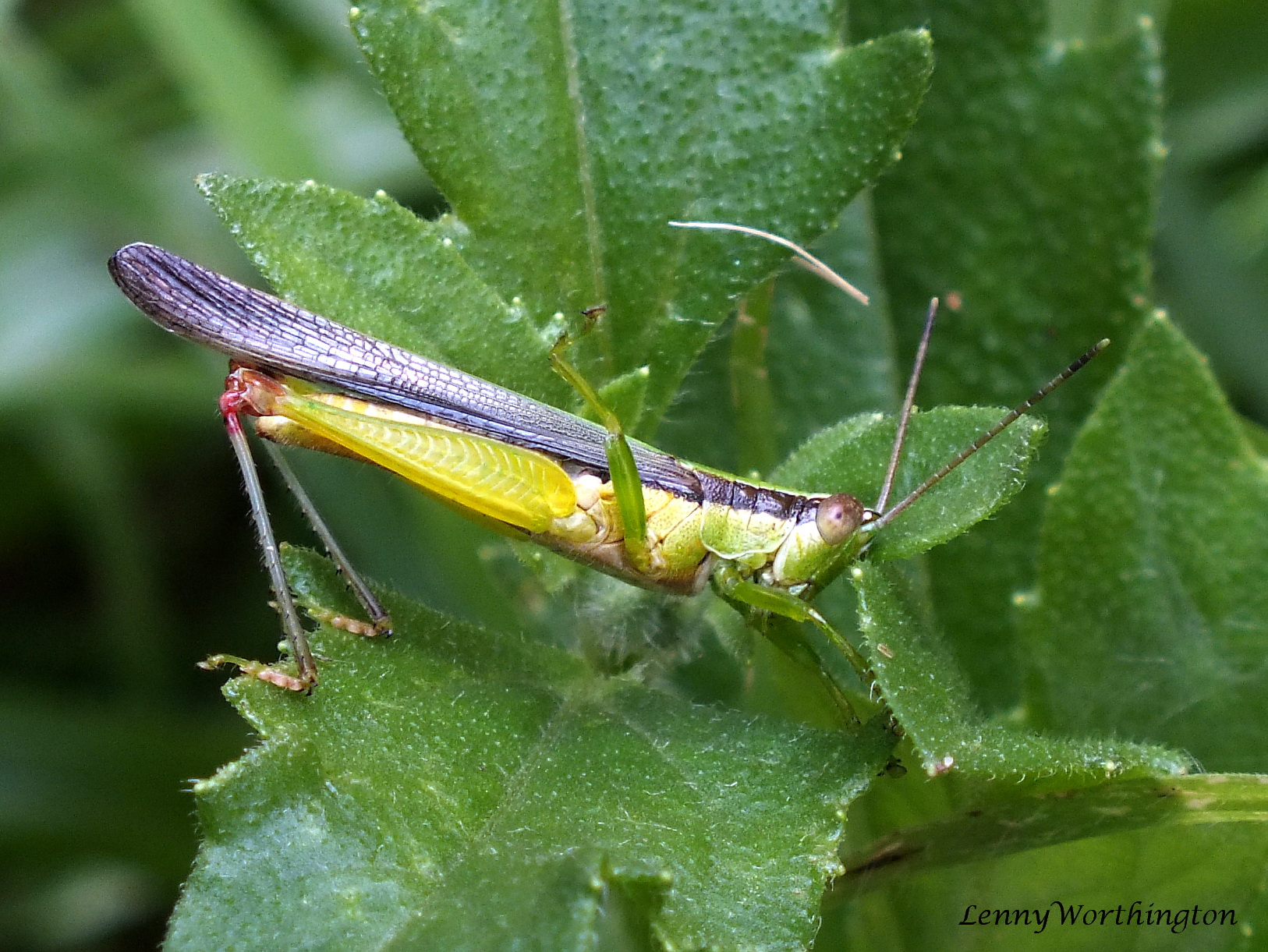

Scientific classification
- Kingdom: Animalia
- Phylum: Arthropoda
- Class: Insecta
- Order: Orthoptera
- Suborder: Caelifera
- Family: Acrididae
- Subfamily: Oxyinae
- Tribe: Oxyini
- Genus: Gesonula; Uvarov, 1940

Synonyms
- Gesonia Stål, 1878

= Gesonula =

Genus of grasshoppers

Gesonula is a genus of grasshoppers (Caelifera: Acrididae) in the subfamily Oxyinae. Species can be found in India through southeast Asia to northeast Australia.

== Species ==
The Orthoptera Species File lists:

- Gesonula mundata (Walker, 1870)
- Gesonula punctifrons (Stål, 1861) type species (as Acridium punctifrons Stål)
- Gesonula szemaoensis Zheng, 1977
