= Praxibulus =

Scientific classification
- Kingdom: Animalia
- Phylum: Arthropoda
- Clade: Pancrustacea
- Class: Insecta
- Order: Orthoptera
- Suborder: Caelifera
- Family: Acrididae
- Subfamily: Oxyinae
- Tribe: Praxibulini
- Genus: Praxibulus; Bolívar, 1906

Synonyms
- Praxilla Stål, 1878

Genus of grasshoppers

Praxibulus is a genus of grasshoppers (Caelifera: Acrididae) found in Australia.

== Species ==
Species include:

- Praxibulus actus Rehn, 1957
- Praxibulus duplex Rehn, 1957
- Praxibulus eurobodallae Key, 1989
- Praxibulus exsculptus Rehn, 1957
- Praxibulus hunteranus Key, 1989
- Praxibulus insolens Rehn, 1957
- Praxibulus laminatus (Stål, 1878) type species (as Praxilla laminatus Stål)
- Praxibulus laticrista Key, 1989
- Praxibulus lewisi Key, 1989
- Praxibulus lophicus Key, 1989
- Praxibulus nexilis Rehn, 1957
- Praxibulus pallens Key, 1989
- Praxibulus queenslandicus Key, 1989
- Praxibulus stali Key, 1989
- Praxibulus tectatus Key, 1989
- Praxibulus triangularis Rehn, 1957
- Praxibulus triquetrus Key, 1989
- Praxibulus ulnaris Sjöstedt, 1921
- Praxibulus uncinatus Key, 1989
- Praxibulus whitei Key, 1989
