= Oxyina =

Scientific classification
- Domain: Eukaryota
- Kingdom: Animalia
- Phylum: Arthropoda
- Class: Insecta
- Order: Orthoptera
- Suborder: Caelifera
- Family: Acrididae
- Subfamily: Oxyinae
- Tribe: Oxyini
- Genus: Oxyina; Hollis, 1975

Genus of grasshoppers

Oxyina is a genus of grasshoppers in the subfamily Oxyinae. Current species records (probably incomplete) are from Pakistan, China, and Java.

== Species ==
Species include:

- Oxyina bidentata (Willemse, 1925)
- Oxyina javana (Willemse, 1955)
- Oxyina kashmira Hassan Baba & Usmani, 2021 (Kashmir, with key to species)
- Oxyina sinobidentata (Hollis, 1971) - type species (as Oxya sinobidentata)
