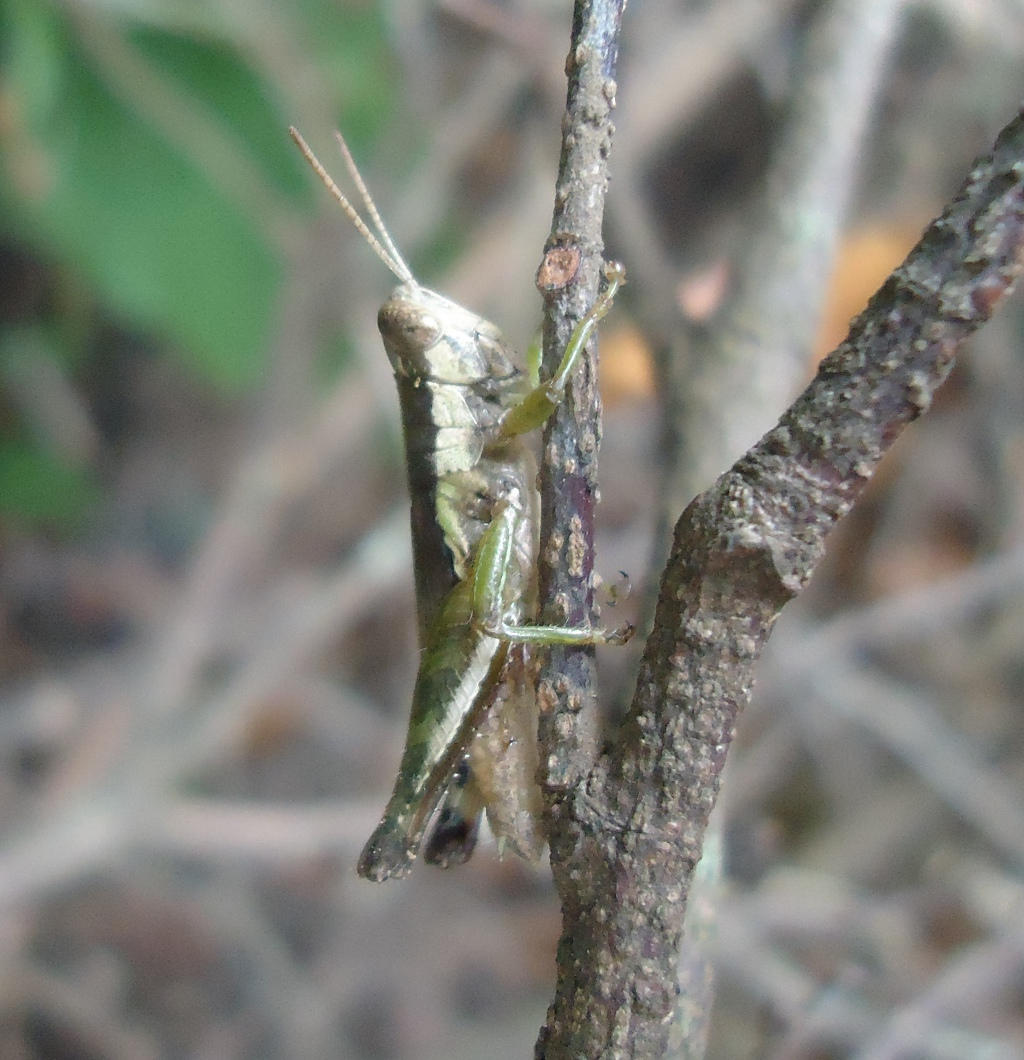
- Pseudoxya diminuta, Philippines

Scientific classification
- Kingdom: Animalia
- Phylum: Arthropoda
- Class: Insecta
- Order: Orthoptera
- Suborder: Caelifera
- Family: Acrididae
- Subfamily: Oxyinae
- Tribe: Oxyini
- Genus: Pseudoxya; Yin & Liu, 1987
- Species: P. diminuta

Binomial name
- Pseudoxya diminuta (Walker, 1871)

Synonyms
- Oxya rufipes Brunner von Wattenwyl, 1893; Traulia diminuta (Walker, 1871); Oxya diminuta Walker, 1871

= Pseudoxya =

Genus of grasshoppers

Pseudoxya diminuta is a species of grasshopper in the monotypic genus Pseudoxya (subfamily Oxyinae).

This species occurs in Indochina, Malesia, and southern China. The holotype is a male from Yunnan, China.

== Gallery ==
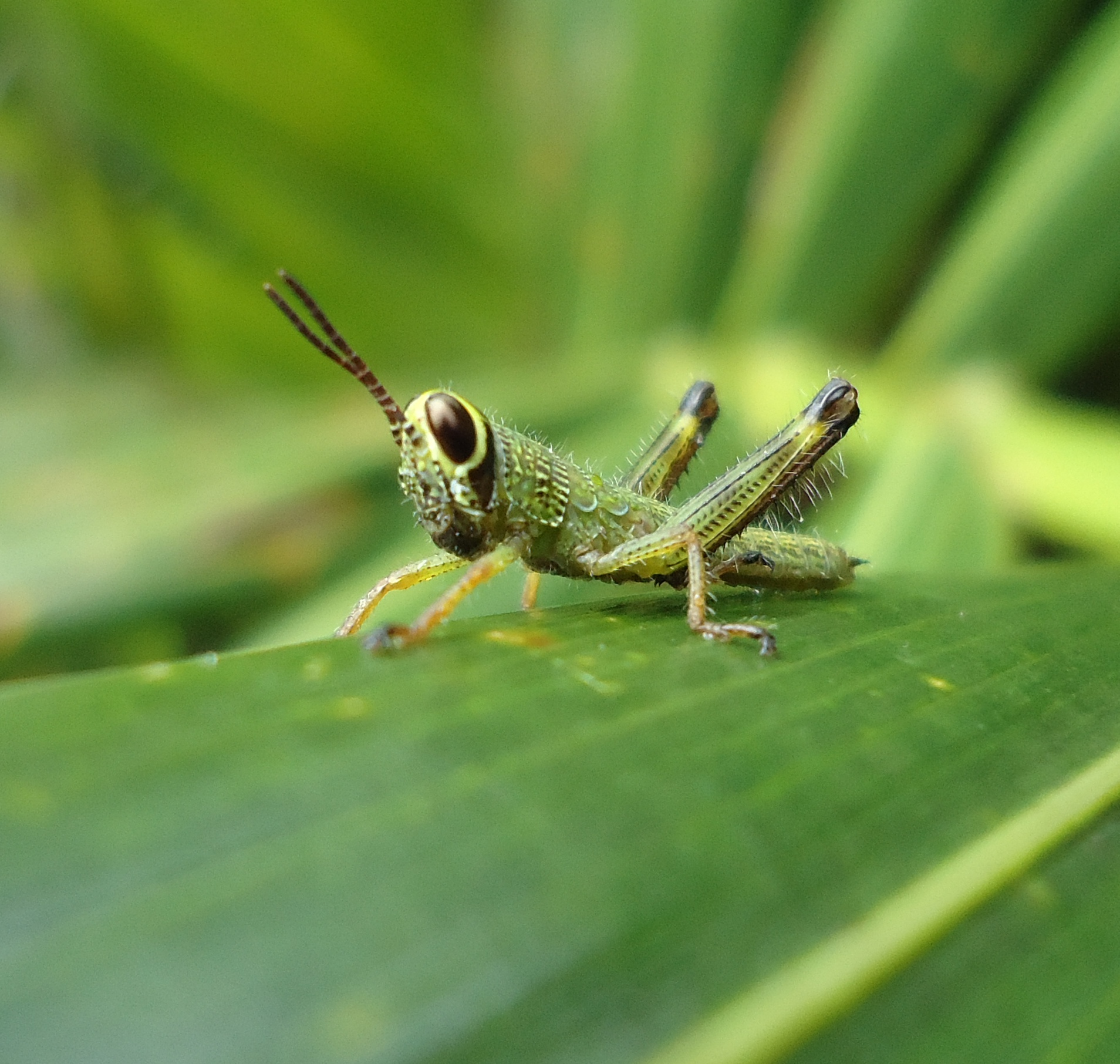
Nymph

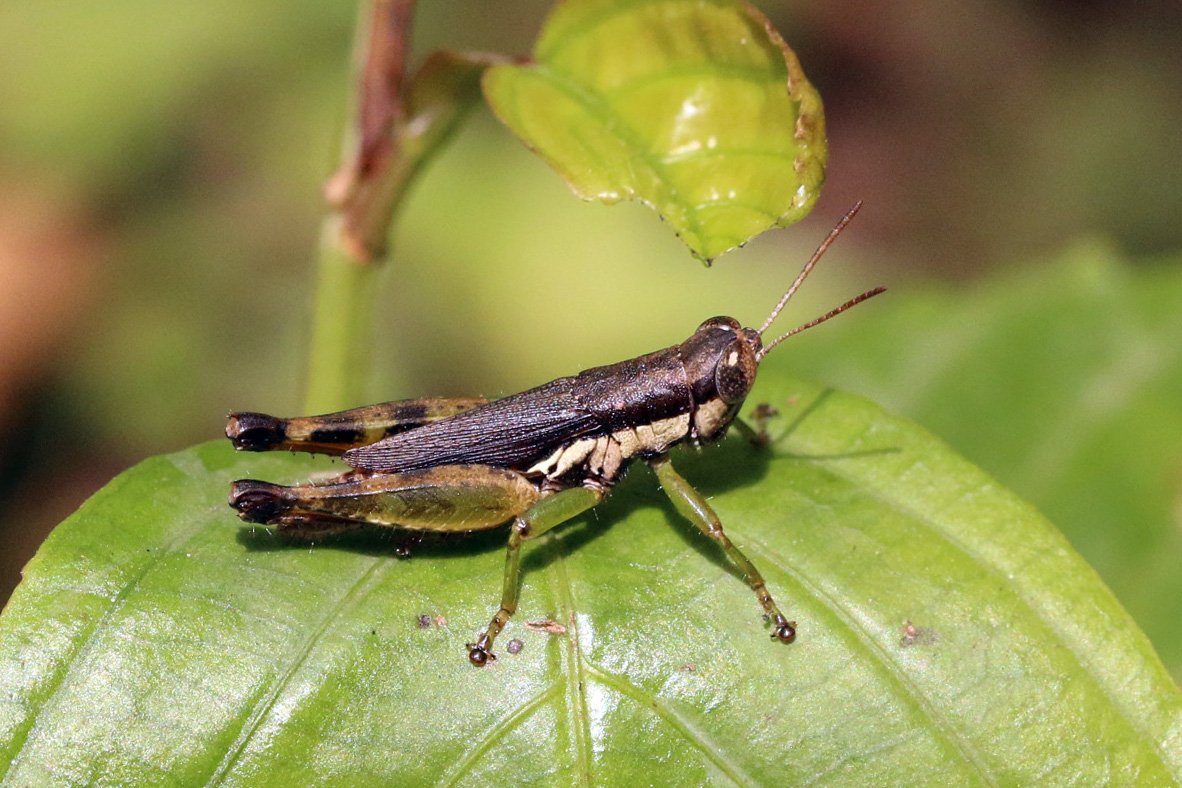
P. diminuta photographed in Sabah, Borneo
