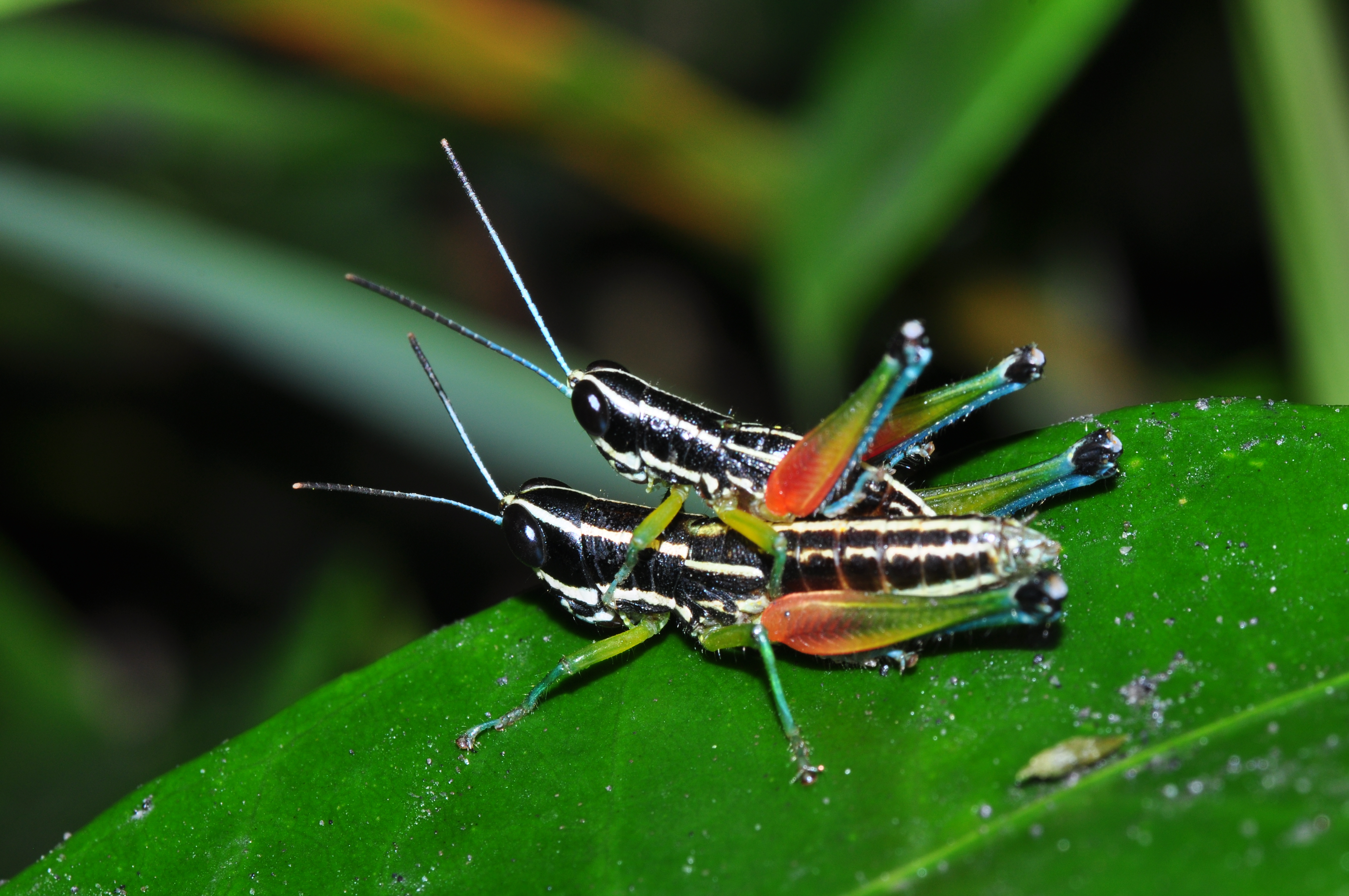

Scientific classification
- Domain: Eukaryota
- Kingdom: Animalia
- Phylum: Arthropoda
- Class: Insecta
- Order: Orthoptera
- Suborder: Caelifera
- Family: Acrididae
- Subfamily: Oxyinae
- Genus: Chitaura; Bolívar, 1918

= Chitaura =

Genus of grasshoppers

Chitaura is a genus of grasshoppers in the subfamily Oxyinae found in tropical Asia.

Species include:

- Chitaura atrata Ramme, 1941
- Chitaura bivittata Ramme, 1941
- Chitaura brachyptera Bolívar, 1918 - type species (Sulawesi)
- Chitaura doloduo Storozhenko, 2018
- Chitaura elegans Ramme, 1941
- Chitaura flavolineata (Willemse, 1931)
- Chitaura indica Uvarov, 1929
- Chitaura linduensis Storozhenko, 2018
- Chitaura lucida (Krauss, 1902)
- Chitaura maculata (Willemse, 1938)
- Chitaura mengkoka Ramme, 1941
- Chitaura mirabilis (Carl, 1916)
- Chitaura moluccensis Ramme, 1941
- Chitaura ochracea Ramme, 1941
- Chitaura poecila Ramme, 1941
- Chitaura samanga (Carl, 1916)
- Chitaura striata Willemse, 1938
- Chitaura vidua (Carl, 1916)
