= Quilta =

Scientific classification
- Domain: Eukaryota
- Kingdom: Animalia
- Phylum: Arthropoda
- Class: Insecta
- Order: Orthoptera
- Suborder: Caelifera
- Family: Acrididae
- Subfamily: Oxyinae
- Tribe: Oxyini
- Genus: Quilta; Stål, 1861

Type species
- Acridium mitratum Stål, 1861

Synonyms
- Quitta Otte, 1995

Genus of grasshoppers

Quilta is a genus of grasshoppers in the subfamily Oxyinae. Species can be found in Indo-China.

== Species ==
The Orthoptera Species File lists the following:

1. Quilta deschauenseei Rehn, 1957 - Thailand
2. Quilta mitrata (Stål, 1861) - type species (as Acridium mitratum Stål) - Vietnam
3. Quilta oryzae Uvarov, 1925 - Thailand & Vietnam
