= Lucretilis =

Scientific classification
- Domain: Eukaryota
- Kingdom: Animalia
- Phylum: Arthropoda
- Class: Insecta
- Order: Orthoptera
- Suborder: Caelifera
- Family: Acrididae
- Subfamily: Oxyinae
- Tribe: Oxyini
- Genus: Lucretilis; Stål, 1878

Genus of grasshoppers

Lucretilis is a genus of grasshoppers in the subfamily Oxyinae and tribe Oxyini. Species can be found in west Malesia.

== Species ==
The Orthoptera Species File lists:

1. Lucretilis antennata Bolívar, 1898
2. Lucretilis balikpapan Storozhenko, 2020
3. Lucretilis bolivari Miller, 1934
4. Lucretilis dohrni Ramme, 1941
5. Lucretilis jucunda Miller, 1953
6. Lucretilis maculata Willemse, 1936
7. Lucretilis splendens Willemse, 1938
8. Lucretilis taeniata Stål, 1878 - type species
9. Lucretilis uvarovi Miller, 1935
