= Fer (insect) =

Scientific classification
- Kingdom: Animalia
- Phylum: Arthropoda
- Class: Insecta
- Order: Orthoptera
- Suborder: Caelifera
- Family: Acrididae
- Subfamily: Oxyinae
- Genus: Fer; Bolívar, 1918

Genus of grasshoppers

External image
- Images at iNaturalist (subject to confirmation)

Fer is a genus of grasshoppers in the subfamily Oxyinae (previously in the related Catantopinae) and not assigned to any tribe. Species can be found in southern China and Vietnam.

== Species ==
The Orthoptera Species File lists:

1. Fer bimaculiformis You & Li, 1983
2. Fer coeruleipennis Bolívar, 1918 - type species
3. Fer guangxiensis Jiang & Zheng, 1994
4. Fer nigripennis Zheng & Xie, 2007
5. Fer nonmaculiformis Zheng, Lian & Xi, 1985
6. Fer yunnanensis Huang & Xia, 1984
