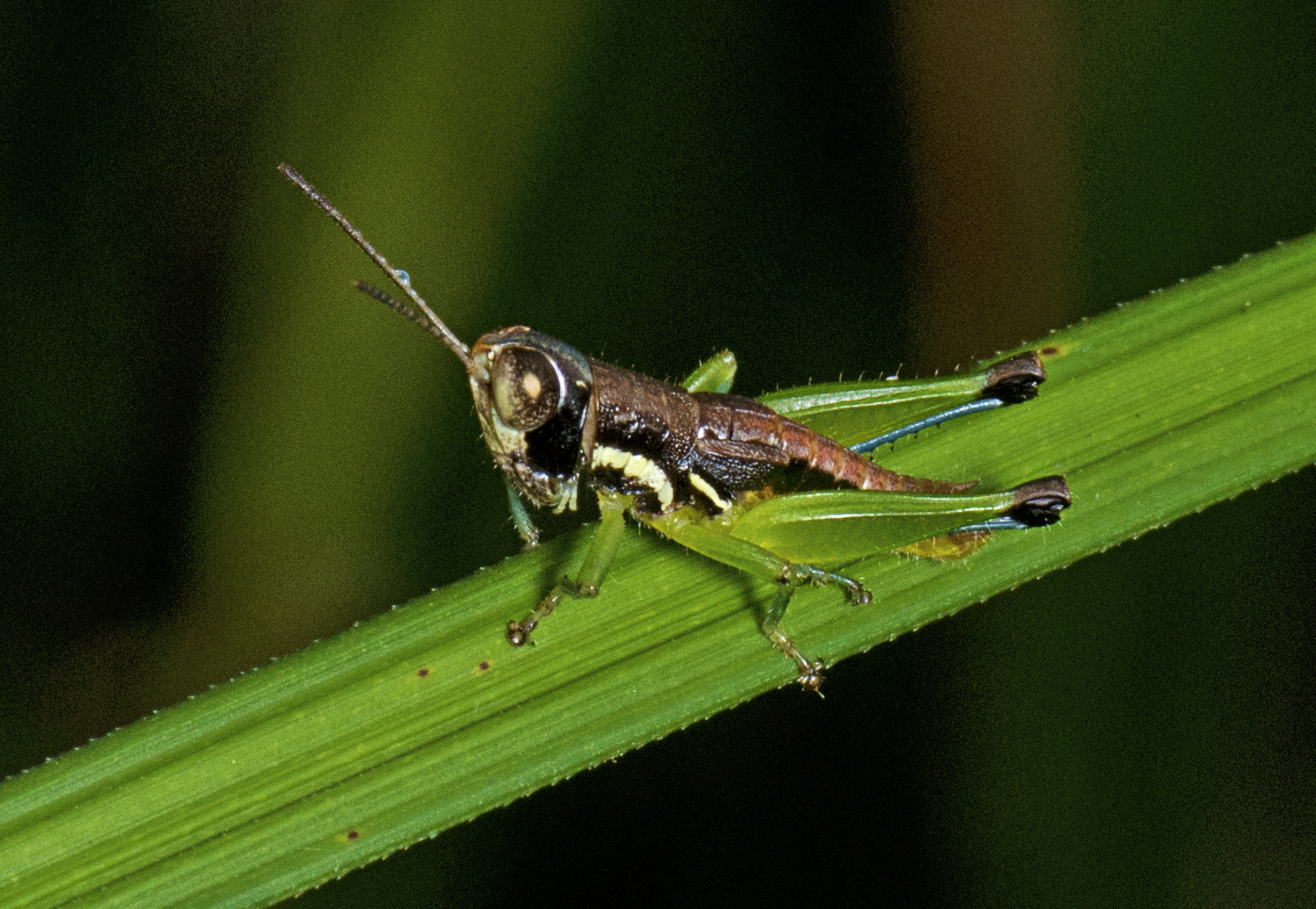
- Methiolopsis geniculata, little black-knees, Australia

Scientific classification
- Kingdom: Animalia
- Phylum: Arthropoda
- Clade: Pancrustacea
- Class: Insecta
- Order: Orthoptera
- Suborder: Caelifera
- Family: Acrididae
- Subfamily: Oxyinae
- Tribe: Praxibulini
- Genus: Methiolopsis; Rehn, 1957
- Species: M. geniculata

Binomial name
- Methiolopsis geniculata (Stål, 1878)

= Methiolopsis =

Genus of grasshoppers

Methiolopsis is a genus of grasshoppers in the family Acrididae. The only species in the genus is Methiolopsis geniculata, sometimes called the "little black knees," found in eastern Australia.
