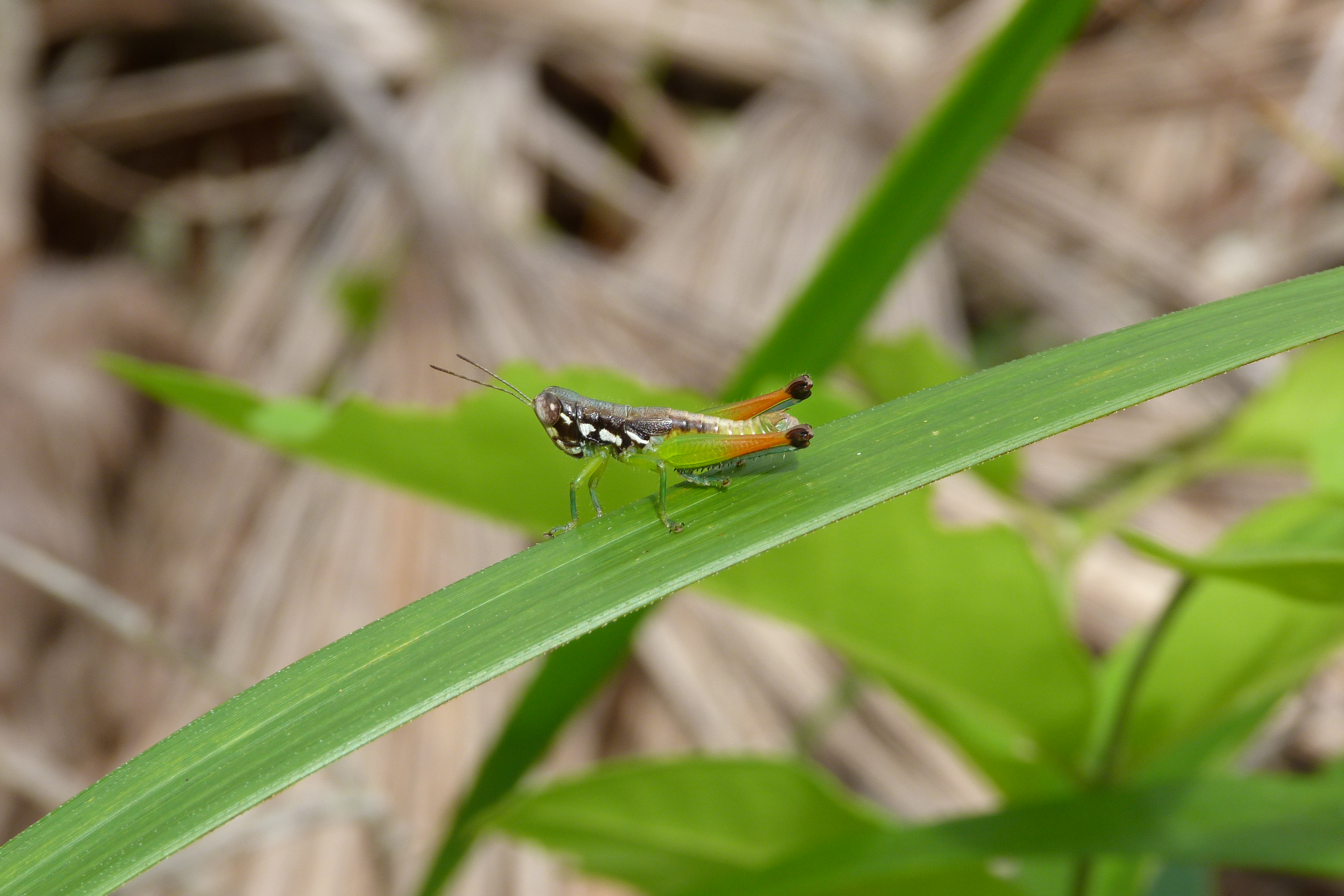
- Methiola picta, red-legged methiola, Australia

Scientific classification
- Kingdom: Animalia
- Phylum: Arthropoda
- Clade: Pancrustacea
- Class: Insecta
- Order: Orthoptera
- Suborder: Caelifera
- Family: Acrididae
- Subfamily: Oxyinae
- Tribe: Praxibulini
- Genus: Methiola; Sjöstedt, 1920
- Species: M. picta

Binomial name
- Methiola picta Sjöstedt, 1920

= Methiola =

Genus of grasshoppers

Methiola is a genus of methiolas in the family Acrididae. There is at least one described species in Methiola, M. picta, found in Australia.
