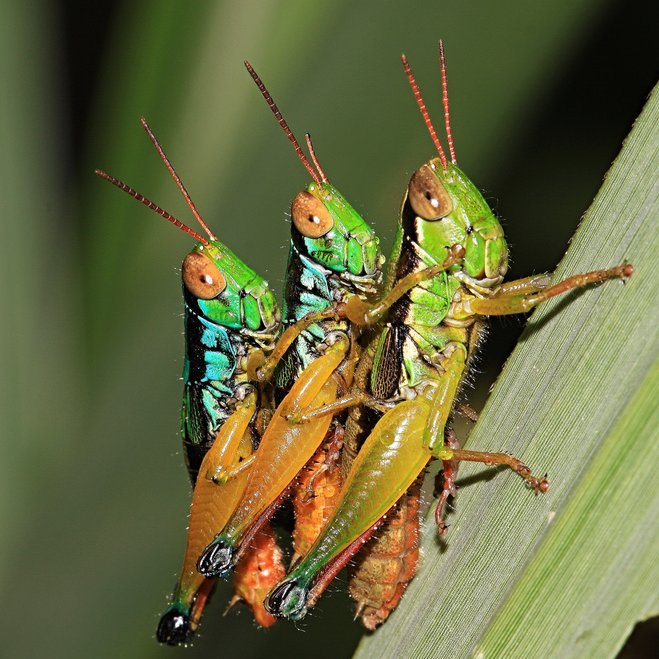
- Caryanda spuria

Scientific classification
- Kingdom: Animalia
- Phylum: Arthropoda
- Clade: Pancrustacea
- Class: Insecta
- Order: Orthoptera
- Suborder: Caelifera
- Family: Acrididae
- Subfamily: Caryandinae; Yin & Liu, 1987

= Caryandinae =

Subfamily of grasshoppers

The Caryandinae are a small subfamily of grasshoppers found mostly in China, India, Indochina and Malesia, but the large type genus Caryanda also has species from Africa. Genera were previously placed in the tribe Oxyini, with the subfamily erected by Yin & Liu in 1987.

== Genera ==
The Orthoptera Species File includes:

1. Caryanda Stål, 1878
2. Cercina Stål, 1878
3. Lemba Huang, 1983
