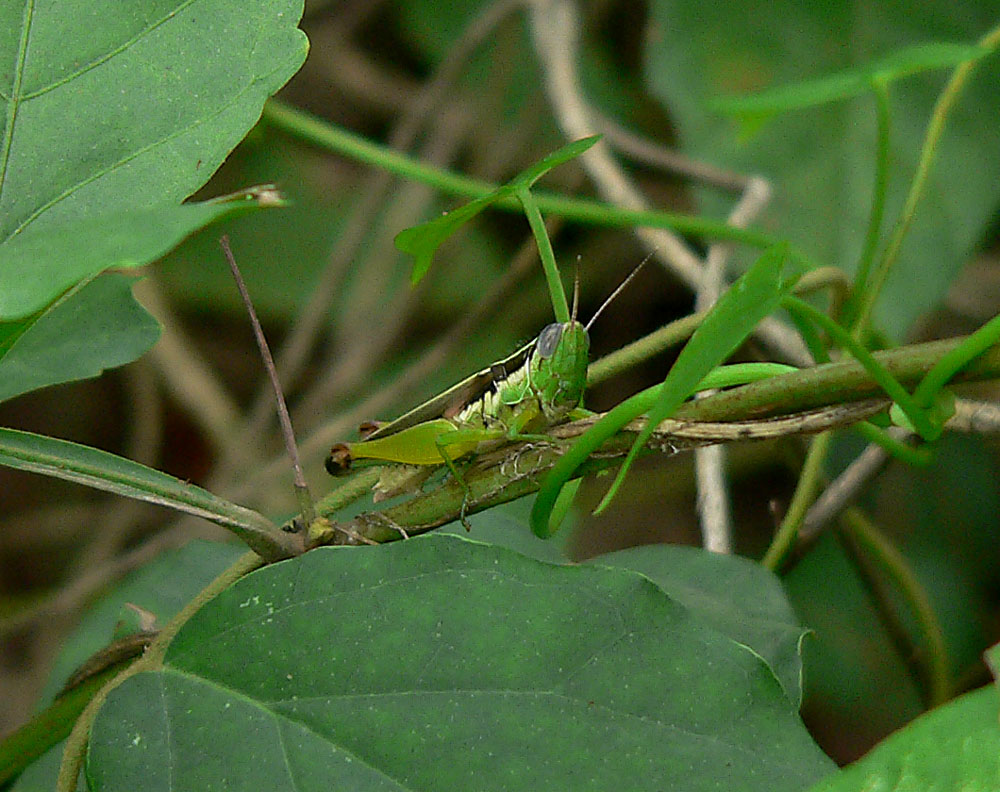
- Oxya hyla (female) in the Lama Forest of Benin

Scientific classification
- Kingdom: Animalia
- Phylum: Arthropoda
- Clade: Pancrustacea
- Class: Insecta
- Order: Orthoptera
- Suborder: Caelifera
- Family: Acrididae
- Subfamily: Oxyinae
- Tribe: Oxyini; Brunner von Wattenwyl, 1893

Synonyms
- Gesonulini Usmani & Shafee, 1984

= Oxyini =

Tribe of grasshoppers

Oxyini is one of two tribes of grasshoppers in the subfamily Oxyinae. Some genera previously listed here are now placed in the subfamilies Caryandinae and Hemiacridinae.

== Genera ==
The Orthoptera Species File includes:

1. Bermiella Bolívar, 1912
2. Bermiodes Bolívar, 1912
3. Bermius Stål, 1878
4. Daperria Sjöstedt, 1921
5. Gesonula Uvarov, 1940
6. Lucretilis Stål, 1878
7. Nepalocaryanda Ingrisch, 1990
8. Oxya Serville, 1831
9. Oxyina Hollis, 1975
10. Pseudocaryanda Willemse, 1939
11. Pseudocranae Bolívar, 1898
12. Pseudoxya Yin & Liu, 1987
13. Quilta Stål, 1861
14. Thanmoia Ramme, 1941
15. Tolgadia Sjöstedt, 1920
