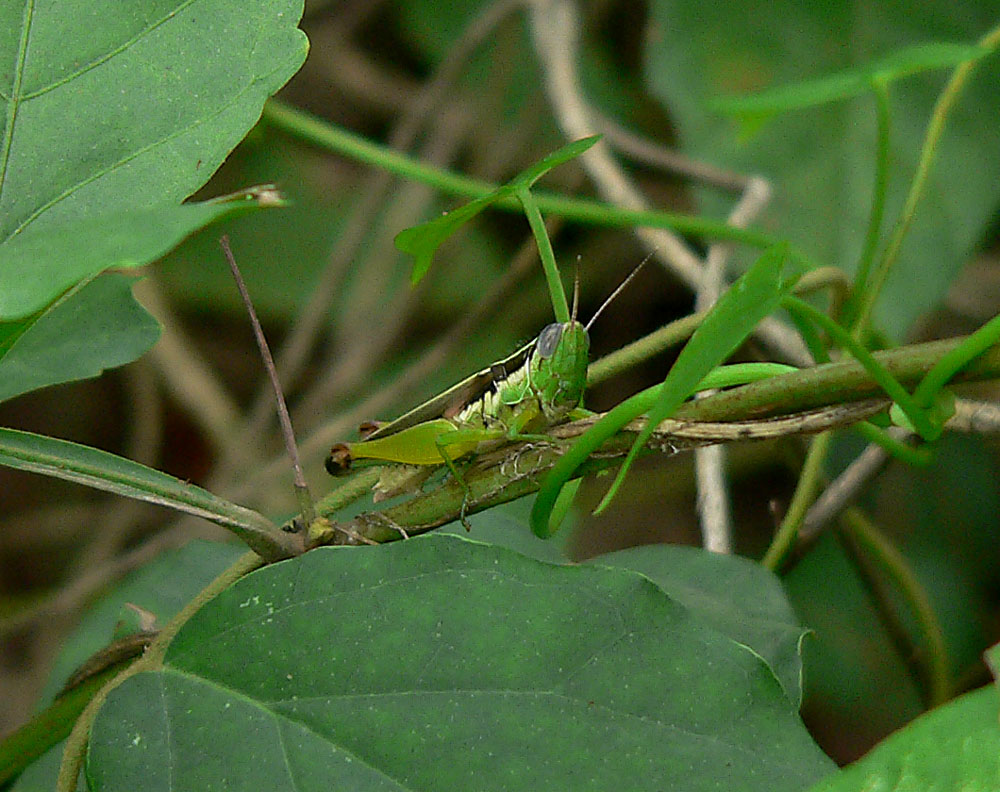
- Oxya hyla (female) in the Lama Forest of Benin

Scientific classification
- Kingdom: Animalia
- Phylum: Arthropoda
- Clade: Pancrustacea
- Class: Insecta
- Order: Orthoptera
- Suborder: Caelifera
- Family: Acrididae
- Subfamily: Oxyinae; Brunner von Wattenwyl, 1893

Tribes
- Oxyini; Praxibulini

= Oxyinae =

Subfamily of grasshoppers

Oxyinae is subfamily of grasshoppers in the family Acrididae. Species are distributed throughout Africa (including Madagascar) and Australasia.

== Tribes and genera ==
According to the Orthoptera Species File there are two clearly defined tribes, Oxyini and Praxibulini, and other genera of uncertain affiliation:

=== Oxyini ===
Auth. Brunner von Wattenwyl, 1893; selected genera:

- Gesonula Uvarov, 1940
- Lucretilis Stål, 1878
- Oxya Serville, 1831
- Oxyina Hollis, 1975
- Pseudoxya Yin & Liu, 1987
- Quilta Stål, 1861
- Thanmoia Ramme, 1941

=== Praxibulini ===
Auth. Rehn, 1957 – Australia

1. Kosciuscola Sjöstedt, 1934
2. Methiola Sjöstedt, 1920
3. Methiolopsis Rehn, 1957
4. Praxibulus Bolívar, 1906

=== Tribe not placed ===
As of March 2024:

1. Badistica Karsch, 1891 – Africa
2. Boninoxya Ishikawa, 2011 – Japan
3. Caryandoides Zheng & Xie, 2007
4. Chitaura Bolívar, 1918 – India, southeast Asia to Papua New Guinea
5. Cylindrotiltus Ramme, 1929 – Africa
6. Digentia Stål, 1878 – Africa
7. Dirshia Brown, 1962 – southern Africa
8. Fer Bolívar, 1918 - China, Indochina
9. Gerista Bolívar, 1905 – Africa
10. Hilloxya Kumar & Chandra, 2019
11. Hygracris Uvarov, 1921 – India
12. Longchuanacris Zheng & Fu, 1989
13. Ochlandriphaga Henry, 1933
14. Oxycrobylus - monotypic Oxycrobylus agilis Ingrisch, 1989 - Thailand
15. Oxytauchira Ramme, 1941 – Indo-China
16. Paratoacris Li & Jin, 1984
17. Pseudogerunda Bey-Bienko, 1935
18. Pterotiltus Karsch, 1893 – Africa
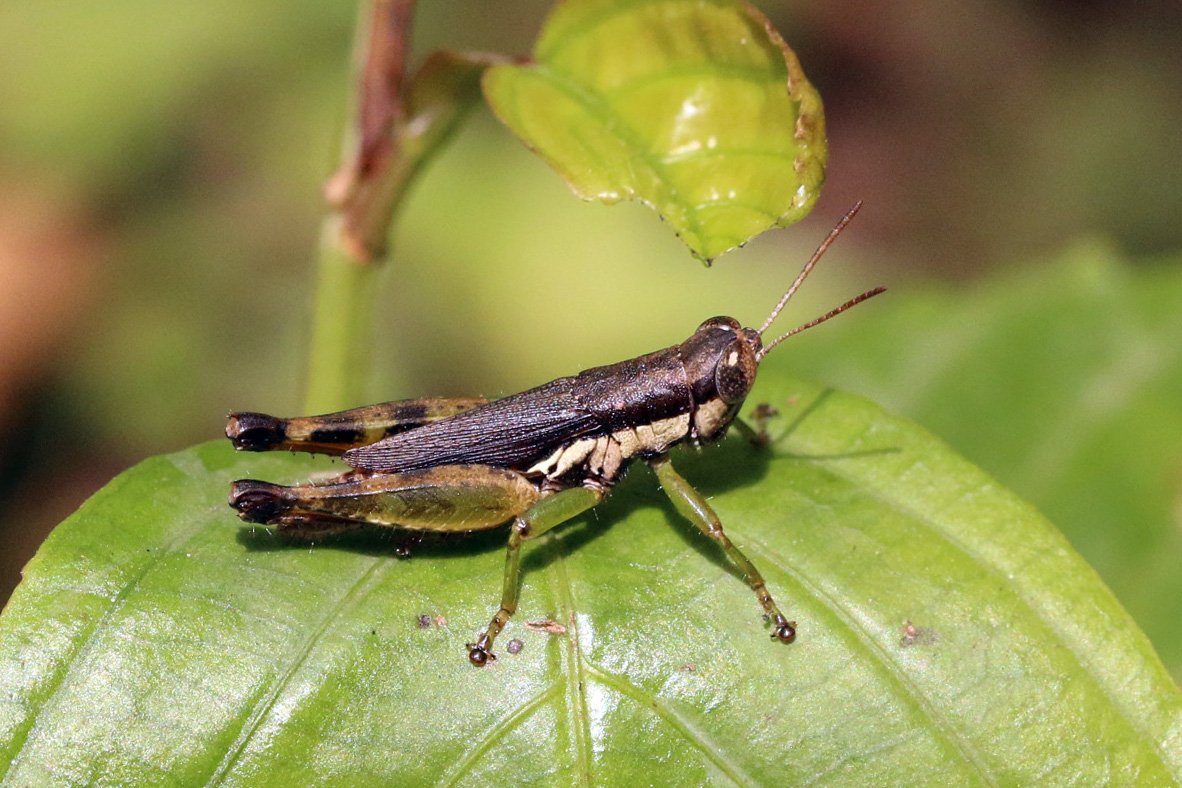
Pseudoxya diminuta

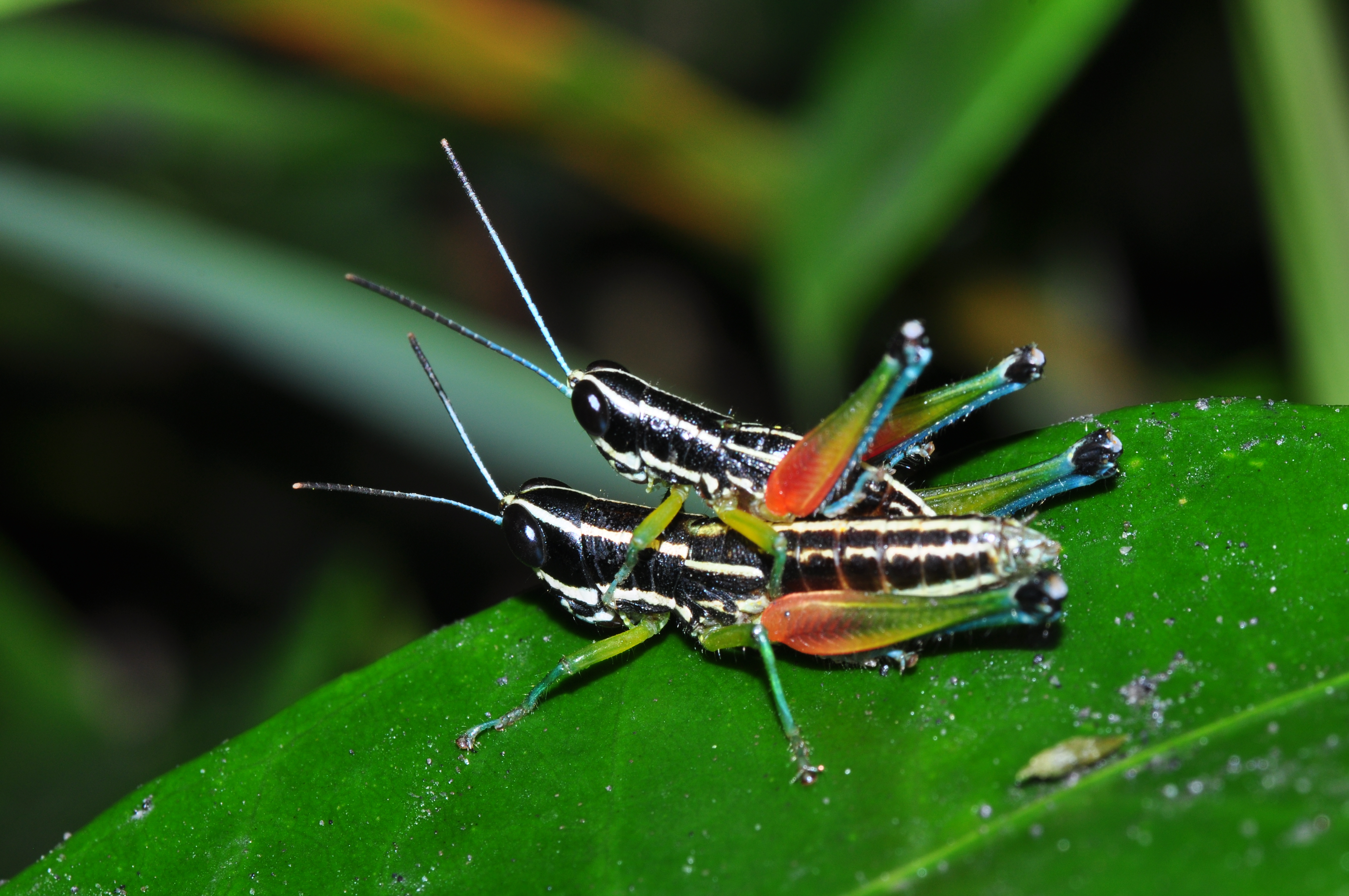
Chitaura sp.

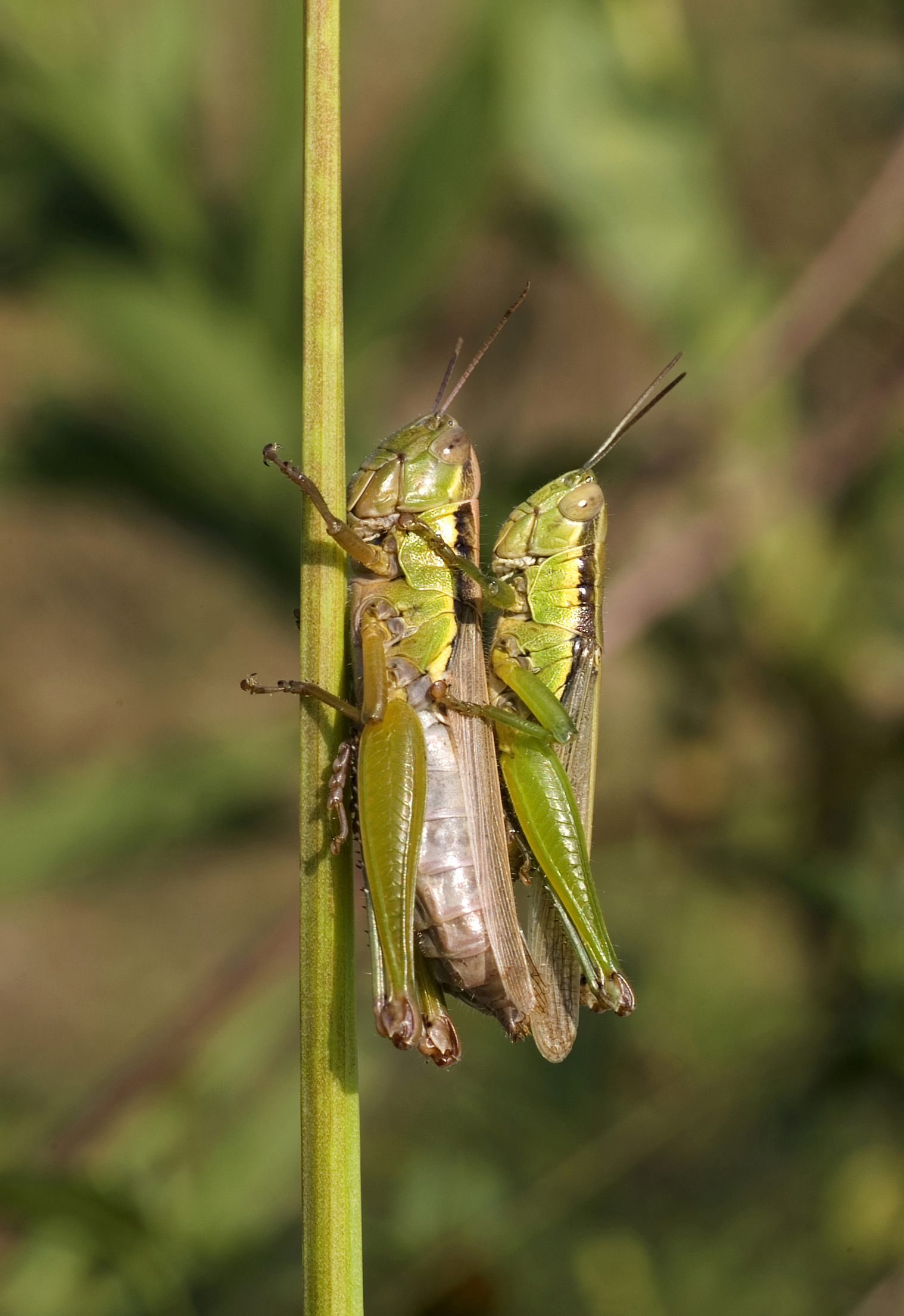
Oxya yezoensis
