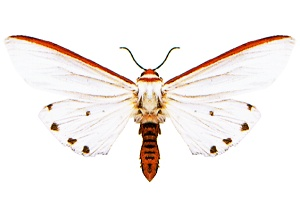
- Aloa marginata

Scientific classification
- Kingdom: Animalia
- Phylum: Arthropoda
- Class: Insecta
- Order: Lepidoptera
- Superfamily: Noctuoidea
- Family: Erebidae
- Subfamily: Arctiinae
- Subtribe: Spilosomina
- Genus: Aloa; Walker, 1855

Type species
- Phalaena lactinea Cramer, 1777

= Aloa =

Genus of moths

Aloa is a genus of tiger moths in the family Erebidae.

== Species ==
- Aloa cardinalis (Butler, 1875)
- Aloa ihlei Černý, 2009
- Aloa lactinea (Cramer, 1777)

=== Aloa sensu lato ===
- Aloa albistriga Walker, 1865
- Aloa collaris Hampson, 1891
- Aloa costalis Walker, 1865
- Aloa flavimargo (Hampson, 1894)
- Aloa gangara Swinhoe, 1892
- Aloa moloneyi Druce, 1887

=== Species transferred into Micraloa ===
- Aloa emittens (Walker, 1855)
- Aloa lineola Fabricius, 1793

=== Species transferred into Paramsacta ===
- Aloa marginata (Donovan, 1805)
- Aloa moorei (Butler, 1875)

== Other uses ==
- Aloa, Queensland, a town in the Northern Peninsula Area Region, Australia
