= Mangisi =

Fermented non-alcoholic drink

Mangisi is a traditional sweet-sour beverage made through the natural fermentation of millet mash and is native to Zimbabwe. The preparation of mangisi varies across different regions of Zimbabwe. In one common method, finger millet is malted and then milled into flour, which is mixed with water. This mixture is gradually heated for about 80 minutes, almost reaching boiling point. The product, known as masvusvu (mash), is then cooled, diluted, and strained. It is left to stand for several hours, allowing spontaneous fermentation to occur, resulting in the final beverage, mangisi. The microorganisms responsible for fermentation are believed to originate from the utensils and the fermentation vessel, as well as from the malt flour that withstands the cooking process.
