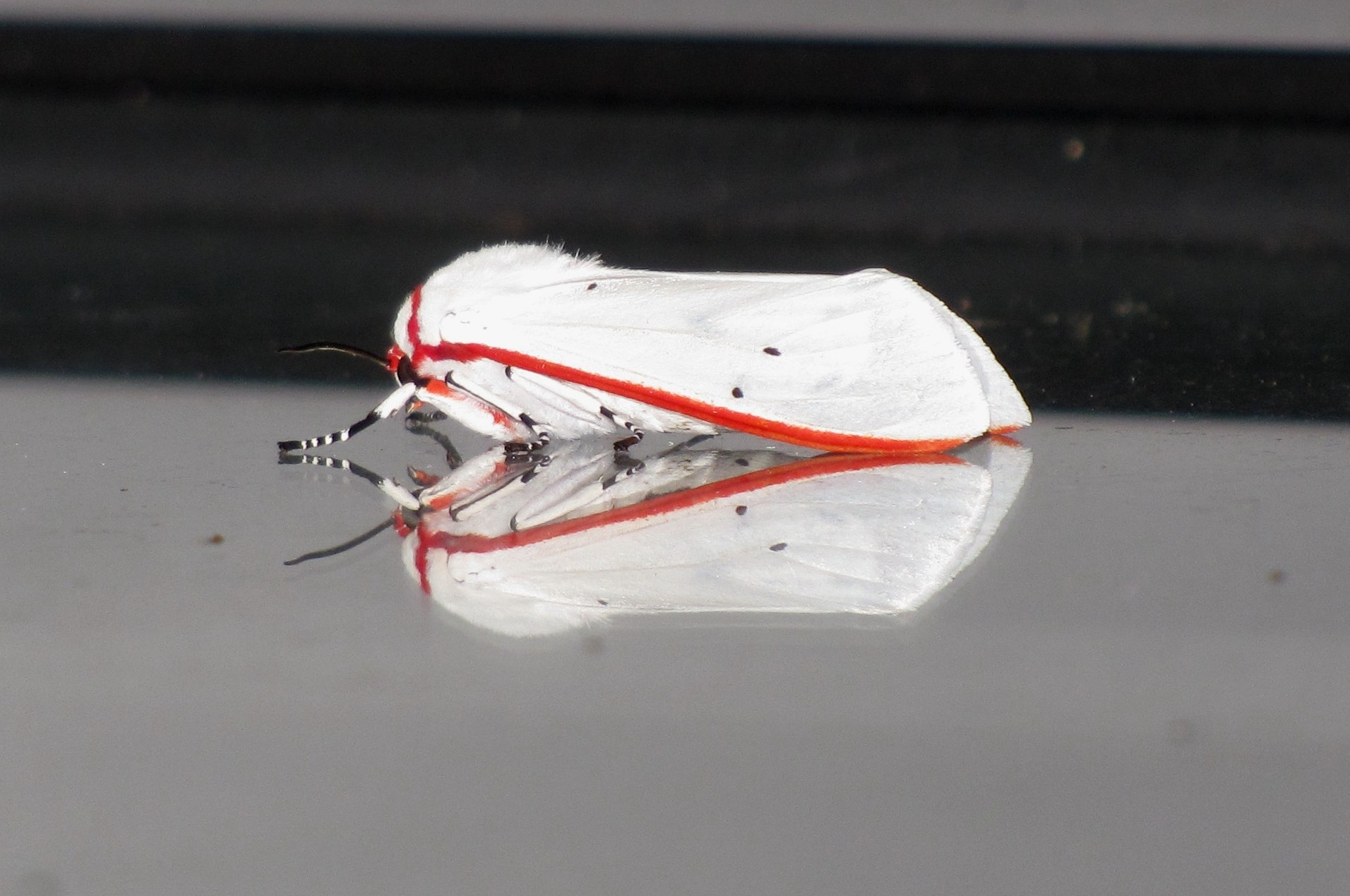
- Side view
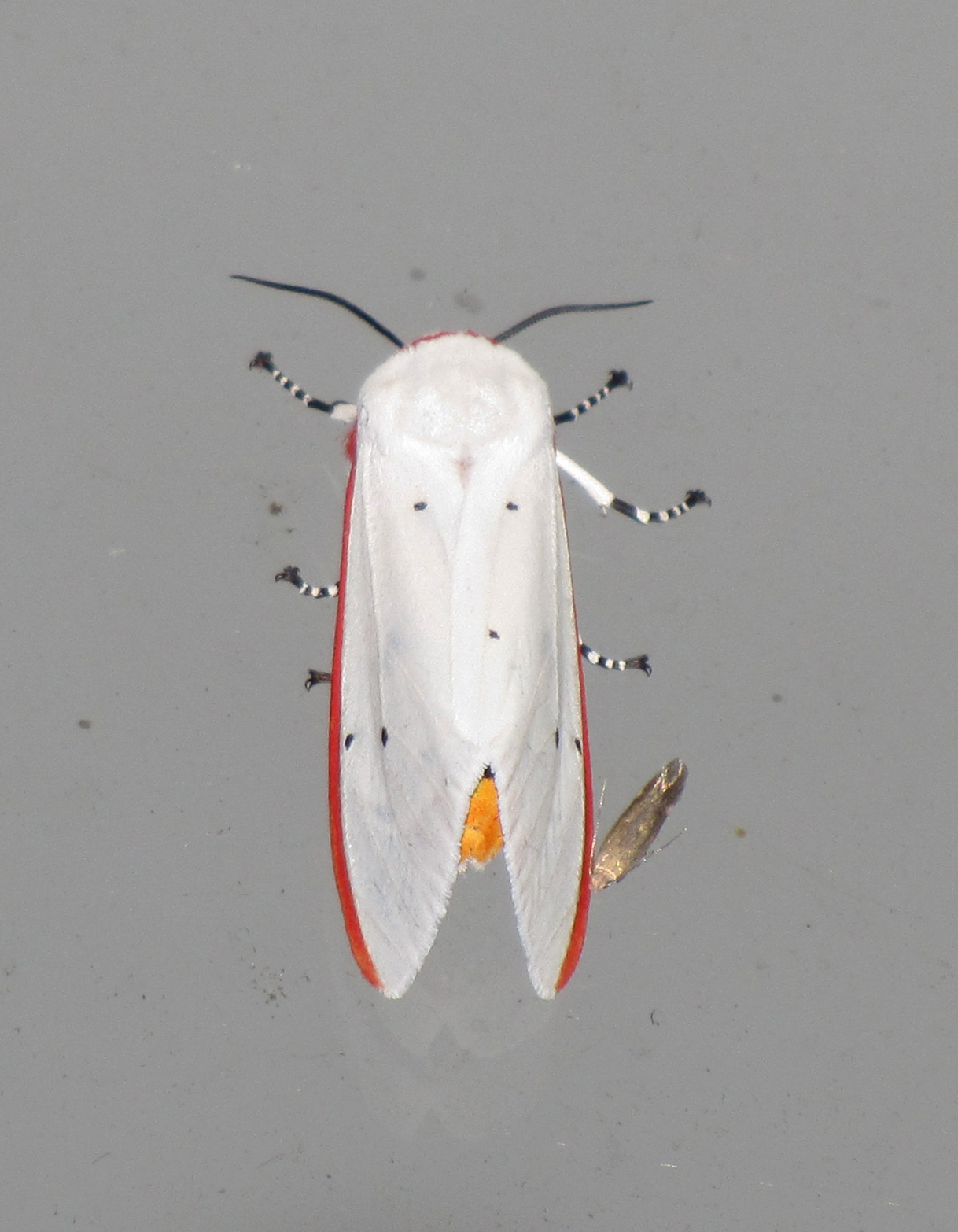
- Top view

Scientific classification
- Kingdom: Animalia
- Phylum: Arthropoda
- Clade: Pancrustacea
- Class: Insecta
- Order: Lepidoptera
- Superfamily: Noctuoidea
- Family: Erebidae
- Subfamily: Arctiinae
- Genus: Aloa
- Species: A. lactinea

Binomial name
- Aloa lactinea (Cramer, 1777)

Synonyms
- Phalaena lactinea Cramer, 1777; Bombyx sanguinolenta Fabricius, 1793; Aloa marginata Moore, 1883; Rhodogastria frederici Kirby, 1892; Aloa sanguinolenta Moore, 1882; Amsacta lactinea Hampson, 1901; Creatonotus negritus Hampson, 1894

= Aloa lactinea =

Red costate tiger moth

Species of moth

Aloa lactinea, the red costate tiger moth, is a moth of family Erebidae. The species was first described by Pieter Cramer in 1777. It is found in India, Japan, southern and western China, Taiwan, Java, Sumatra, Sri Lanka, Myanmar, and the Philippines.

== Description ==
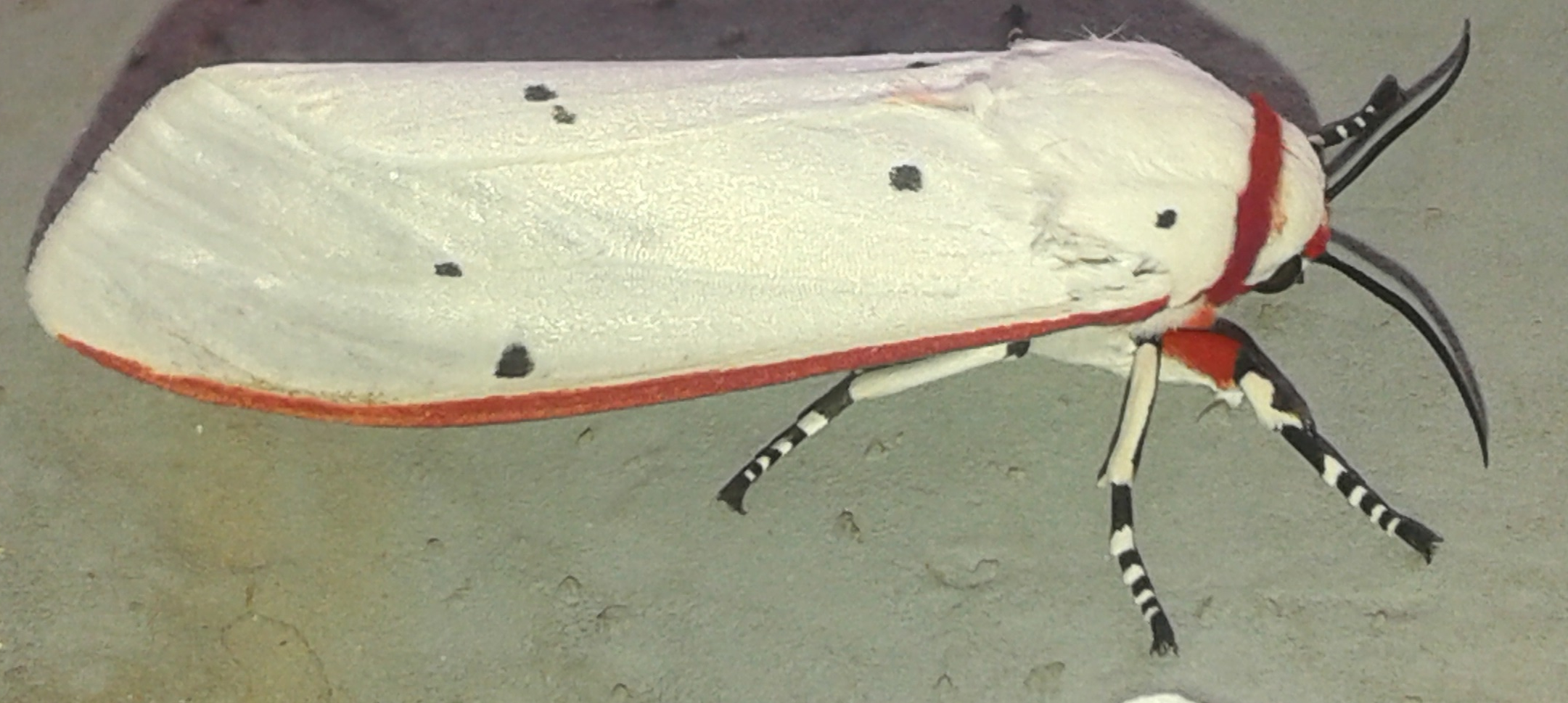
In Ezhimala, Kerala, India

Its wingspan is about 40 mm long. Females larger than males. The abdomen is white, dorsally black with mustard yellow bands.. Antennae black with a scarlet basal joint. Palpi scarlet at sides, white below, the terminal joint black. Head white with a crimson line behind it. Thorax white with lateral black speck in females. Wings primarily white. Forewings with a scarlet fascia along the costa. Red markings are with a deep crimson tone. The band on the head is broader. A black speck at each angle of cell present, but some absent. Hindwings with a black spot at end of cell and a sub-marginal series of four, the two towards anal angle sometimes absent. Larva black with lateral tufts of reddish-brown hair. A sub-dorsal series of scarlet spots present. Dorsal, sub-dorsal, and lateral series of black spots also present. Somites 1st, 3rd, 4th and 5th with sub-lateral spots. Two spots only on the 11th somite.

== Ecology ==
The species is found in primary and secondary habitats ranging from the lowlands to montane regions. It is a minor pest. The caterpillar feeds on Giant Milkweed (Calotropis gigantea), castor, coffee, jute, groundnut, teak, ragi, sunflower, maize, finger millet, sweet potato, and beans.
