= Paramsacta =

Scientific classification
- Domain: Eukaryota
- Kingdom: Animalia
- Phylum: Arthropoda
- Class: Insecta
- Order: Lepidoptera
- Superfamily: Noctuoidea
- Family: Erebidae
- Subfamily: Arctiinae
- Subtribe: Spilosomina
- Genus: Paramsacta; Hulstaert, 1923

Type species
- Paramsacta pura Hulstaert, 1923

Genus of moths

Paramsacta is a genus of moths in the family Erebidae. It includes two species:

- Paramsacta marginata (Donovan, 1805)
- Paramsacta moorei (Butler, 1876)

Probably, some species of Aloa sensu lato also belong to this genus.
