= Amsacta transiens =

Scientific classification
- Domain: Eukaryota
- Kingdom: Animalia
- Phylum: Arthropoda
- Class: Insecta
- Order: Lepidoptera
- Superfamily: Noctuoidea
- Family: Erebidae
- Subfamily: Arctiinae
- Genus: Amsacta
- Species: A. transiens

Binomial name
- Amsacta transiens

Species of moth

Amsacta transiens is a species of moth in the family Erebidae. It is a pest of Eleusine coracana, finger millet.
