= Aloa costalis =

Scientific classification
- Kingdom: Animalia
- Phylum: Arthropoda
- Class: Insecta
- Order: Lepidoptera
- Superfamily: Noctuoidea
- Family: Erebidae
- Subfamily: Arctiinae
- Genus: Aloa
- Species: A. costalis

Binomial name
- Aloa costalis Walker, 1865

Synonyms
- Aloa corsima Swinhoe, 1892; Aloa corsina

Species of moth

Aloa costalis is a moth that belongs to the family Erebidae. It was described by Francis Walker in 1865. It is found in north-eastern Australia.
