= Aloa flavimargo =

Scientific classification
- Kingdom: Animalia
- Phylum: Arthropoda
- Clade: Pancrustacea
- Class: Insecta
- Order: Lepidoptera
- Superfamily: Noctuoidea
- Family: Erebidae
- Subfamily: Arctiinae
- Genus: Aloa
- Species: A. flavimargo

Binomial name
- Aloa flavimargo (Hampson, 1894)

Synonyms
- Creatonotus flavimargo Hampson, 1894; Amsacta flavimargo

Species of moth

Aloa flavimargo is a moth of the family Erebidae. It was described by George Hampson in 1894. It is found in Myanmar.

== See also ==
- Erebidae
- Moth
