= Dhindo =

Nepalese flour dish

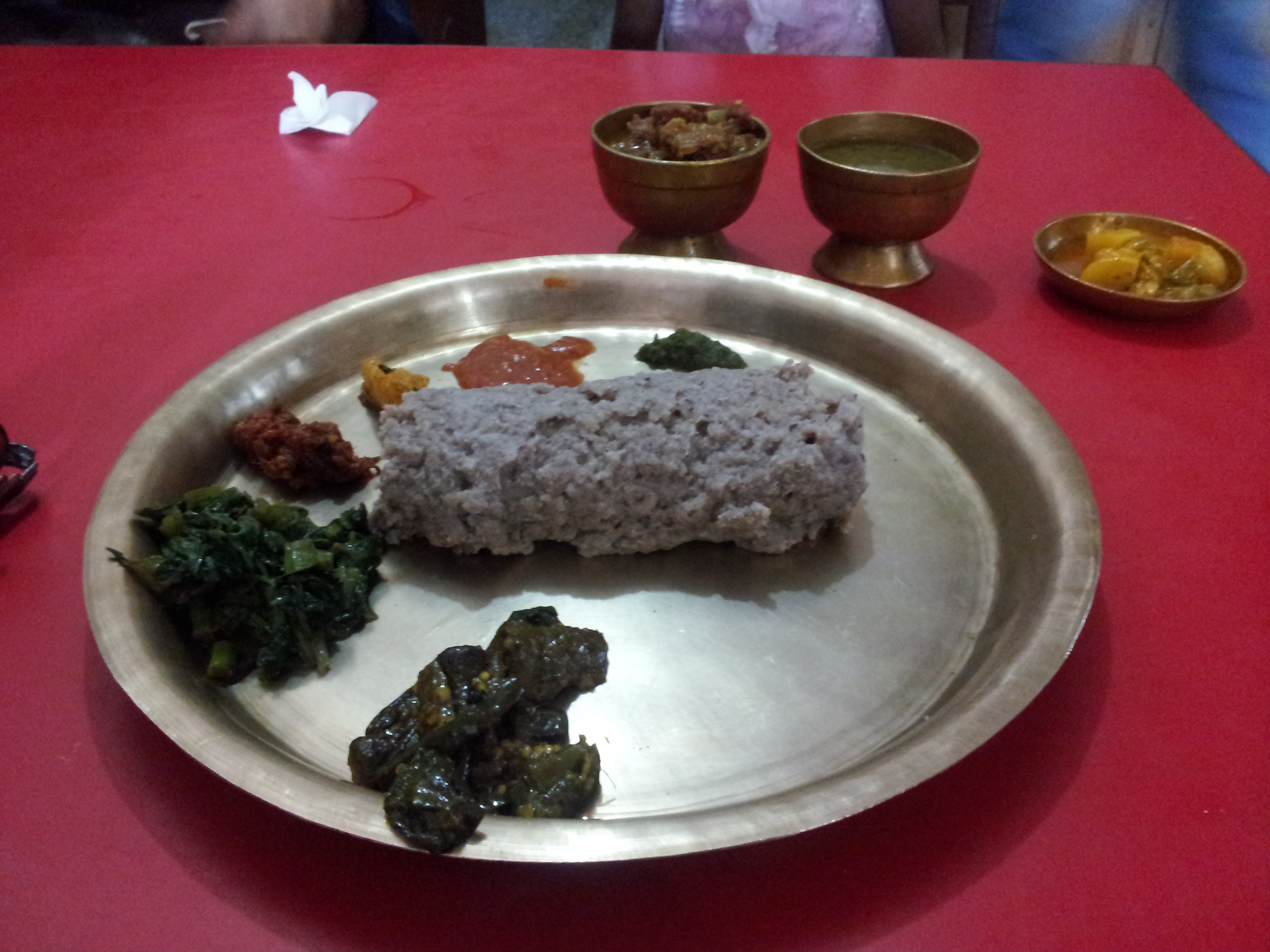
- Dhindo thali in a thakali restaurant in Nepal
- Course: Meal
- Region or state: Nepal
- Main ingredients: water, white flour, buckwheat, vegetables

Dhindo (Nepali: ढिँडो [ɖʱĩɽo]) is a meal prepared in Nepal. It is prepared by gradually adding flour to boiling water while stirring. It is a staple meal in various parts of Nepal, especially in the mountainous regions of Nepal and the Sikkim and Darjeeling regions of India. Though it is a staple food in Nepal, dhindo has previously been seen as an inferior food compared to rice, and was associated with low status. The inclusion of dhindo on urban restaurant menus has coincided with a rise in the food's prestige, possibly attributable to the changing perception of Nepal's indigenous crops, which are now recognized for their nutritional advantage.

== Preparation and serving ==
To prepare dhindo, water and flour are combined in a ratio of approximately three to one. While cooking, dhindo may have ghee, garlic, salt or sugar added to it, or the ghee may be served separately. The flour is added to the boiling water slowly, and stirred vigorously until the mixture is stiff. The process of making dhindo is called maskaaune (मस्काउने).

Dhindo is traditionally prepared from ground buckwheat or millet, but corn meal is common as well. Theoretically, any flour can be used to make dhindo, as it is essentially a simple mixture of hot water and ground grain. Optionally, chopped mutton can be added to the dhindo, or small pieces or powder of soft chhurpi.

The vessel of choice for preparing dhindo is a phalame tapke (iron pan). A narrow iron spatula called a dabilo (दाबिलो) is used to stir the dhindo as it thickens.

Dhindo is eaten by making a small ball with one's fingers, dipping it in a liquid (lentil soup, meat soup, milk or gundruk) and swallowing without chewing. It is often served with aachar, lentils, gundruk, and various meat and vegetable curries.

== See also ==
- Nepalese cuisine
- Ragi mudde, a similar South Indian dish
- Ugali - a similar preparation from Africa
- Asida
- Dal bhat
- Polenta
