= Upsaaru =

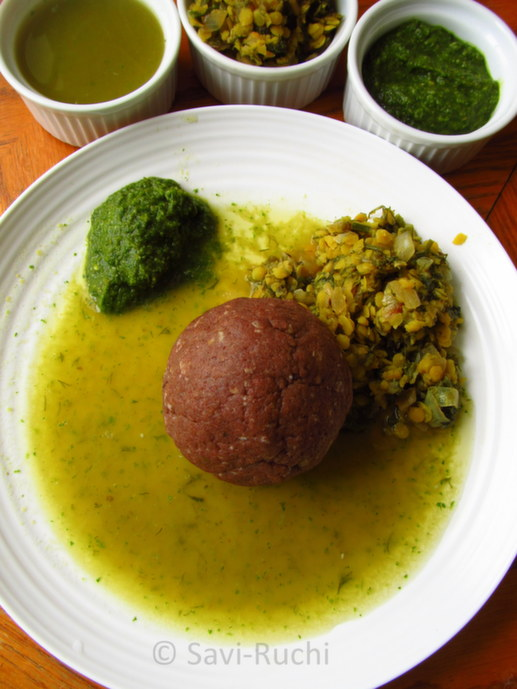
A lunch of upsaaru and other foods

Upsaaru, also known as Uppesaru, is a kind of sambar in South India mainly in the southern part of Karnataka state. It is a traditional food of South Karnataka, especially in the districts of Mandya and Ramanagara.

== Etymology ==
The word Upsaaru is formed by a combination of two words, namely uppu (salt) and saaru (soup). The main ingredients of Upsaaru are salt, water and a small quantity of chili powder. It is being prepared since a long time in villages and is used to swallow Raagi mudde.
