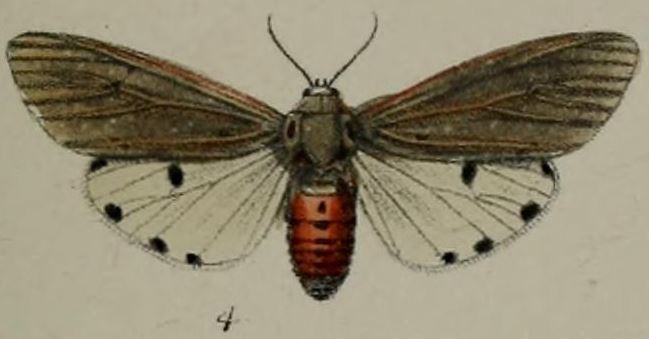

Scientific classification
- Domain: Eukaryota
- Kingdom: Animalia
- Phylum: Arthropoda
- Class: Insecta
- Order: Lepidoptera
- Superfamily: Noctuoidea
- Family: Erebidae
- Subfamily: Arctiinae
- Genus: Aloa
- Species: A. moloneyi

Binomial name
- Aloa moloneyi (H. Druce, 1887)

Synonyms
- Areas moloneyi H. Druce, 1887; Amsacta hampsoni Rothschild, 1910; Amsacta senegalensis Rothschild, 1933

= Aloa moloneyi =

Species of moth

Aloa moloneyi is a species of moth of the family Erebidae. It was described by Herbert Druce in 1887. It is found in Cameroon, Eritrea, Ghana, Nigeria, Senegal, Sudan and the Gambia.
