= Aloa gangara =

Scientific classification
- Domain: Eukaryota
- Kingdom: Animalia
- Phylum: Arthropoda
- Class: Insecta
- Order: Lepidoptera
- Superfamily: Noctuoidea
- Family: Erebidae
- Subfamily: Arctiinae
- Genus: Aloa
- Species: A. gangara

Binomial name
- Aloa gangara C. Swinhoe, 1892

Synonyms
- Amsacta gangara ab. gangarides Strand, 1919

Species of moth

Aloa gangara is a moth of the family Erebidae. It was described by Charles Swinhoe in 1892. It is found in northern and western Australia, including the state of Victoria.
