= Aloa cardinalis =

Scientific classification
- Domain: Eukaryota
- Kingdom: Animalia
- Phylum: Arthropoda
- Class: Insecta
- Order: Lepidoptera
- Superfamily: Noctuoidea
- Family: Erebidae
- Subfamily: Arctiinae
- Genus: Aloa
- Species: A. cardinalis

Binomial name
- Aloa cardinalis (Butler, 1875)

Synonyms
- Areas cardinalis Butler, 1875; Amsacta cardinalis; Amsacta celebensis Rothschild, 1910; Amsacta celebesica Rothschild, 1910; Amsacta luteomarginata Rothschild, 1910; Aloa cardinalis celebensis (Rothschild, 1910); Aloa cardinalis luteomarginata (Rothschild, 1910); Aloa cardinalis reducta (Rothschild, 1910)

Species of moth

Aloa cardinalis is a moth of the family Erebidae. It was described by Arthur Gardiner Butler in 1875.

It is found on the Philippines, Sulawesi, the Tokan-Besi-Islands, Timor, Dammer, Letti-Moa, Tenimber and Bali.

The species is found in secondary habitats in the lowlands.

Adults have been recorded on wing in January, from May to July and in September.

The larvae feed Carowatti species.
