= Aloa ihlei =

Scientific classification
- Domain: Eukaryota
- Kingdom: Animalia
- Phylum: Arthropoda
- Class: Insecta
- Order: Lepidoptera
- Superfamily: Noctuoidea
- Family: Erebidae
- Subfamily: Arctiinae
- Genus: Aloa
- Species: A. ihlei

Binomial name
- Aloa ihlei Černý, 2009

Species of moth

Aloa ihlei is a moth of the family Erebidae. It was described by Karel Černý in 2009 and is endemic to Thailand.
