= Micraloa =

Scientific classification
- Kingdom: Animalia
- Phylum: Arthropoda
- Clade: Pancrustacea
- Class: Insecta
- Order: Lepidoptera
- Superfamily: Noctuoidea
- Family: Erebidae
- Subfamily: Arctiinae
- Subtribe: Spilosomina
- Genus: Micraloa; Dubatolov, 2004

Type species
- Bombyx lineola Fabricius, 1793

Genus of moths

Micraloa is a genus of moths in the family Erebidae from Hindustan, Himalayas, Sri Lanka and Myanmar (Burma).

== Species ==
- Micraloa lineola (Fabricius, 1793)
- Micraloa emittens (Walker, 1855)
