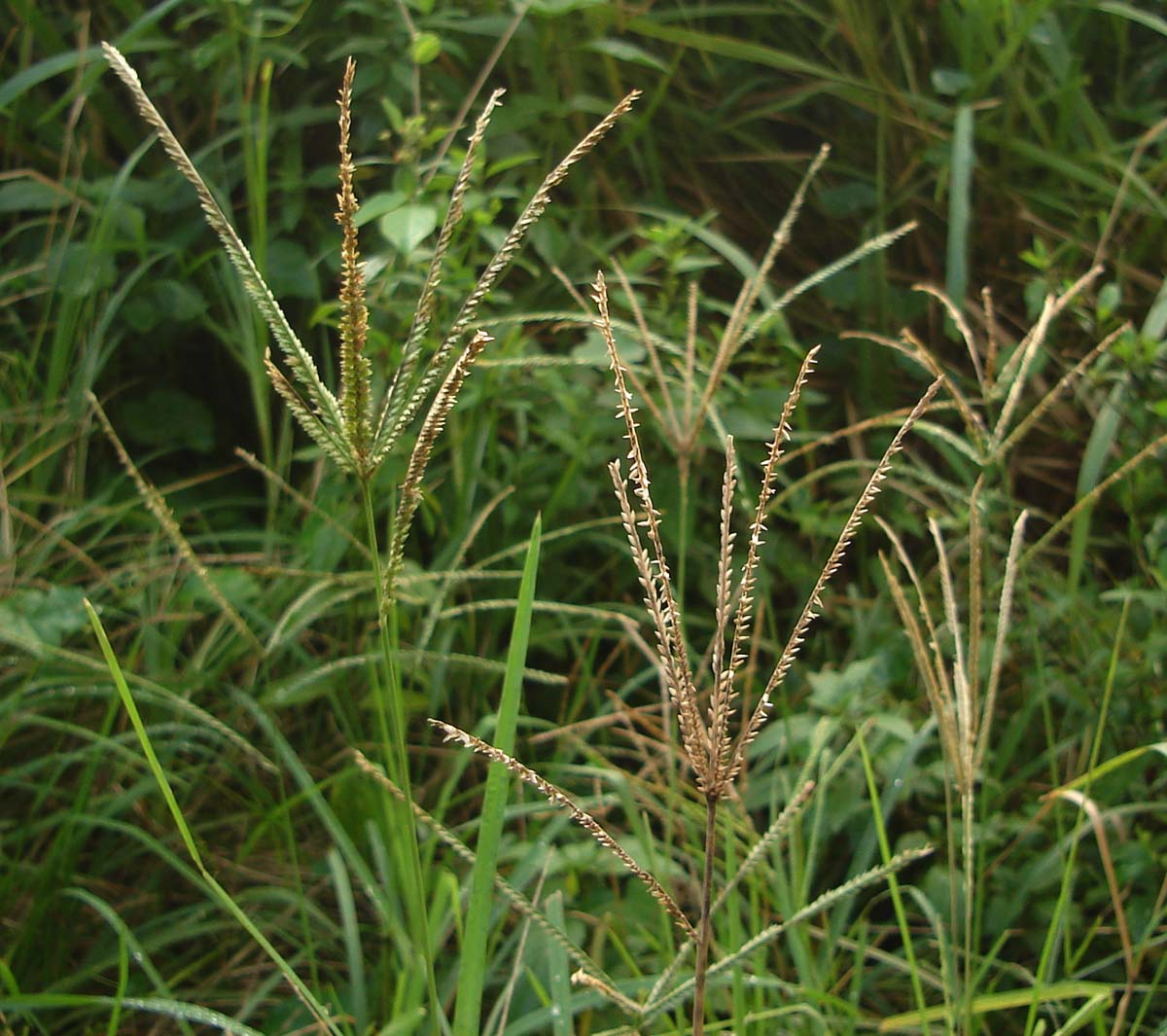

Scientific classification
- Kingdom: Plantae
- Clade: Tracheophytes
- Clade: Angiosperms
- Clade: Monocots
- Clade: Commelinids
- Order: Poales
- Family: Poaceae
- Subfamily: Chloridoideae
- Genus: Eleusine
- Species: E. indica

Binomial name
- Eleusine indica (L.) Gaertn.

= Eleusine indica =

Species of plant (grass)

Eleusine indica, the Indian goosegrass, yard-grass, goosegrass, wiregrass, or crowfootgrass, is a species of grass in the family Poaceae. It is a small annual grass distributed throughout the warmer areas of the world to about 50 degrees latitude. It is an invasive species in some areas.

Eleusine indica is closely related to Eleusine coracana (finger millet or African finger millet), and the diploid E. indica is likely an ancestor of the allotetraploid E. coracana.

Seeds of E. indica are edible and are sometimes used as a famine food, but yields are low. It is an important weed of cultivated crops, lawns, and golf courses. It thrives in disturbed areas with compacted soils in full sun. Both tillage and herbicides are used in its control. This low-growing grass is capable of setting seed even when closely mown. Some populations have evolved resistance to certain herbicides, including glyphosate.

Eleusine indica performs C_{4} photosynthesis and therefore can grow in hot climates and in the hotter months of the temperate zone. Its seeds germinate later in spring than most other temperate zone weeds, such as crabgrasses. Though usually considered an annual, it may survive for more than a year in climates not subject to frost.
