= Aloa collaris =

Scientific classification
- Domain: Eukaryota
- Kingdom: Animalia
- Phylum: Arthropoda
- Class: Insecta
- Order: Lepidoptera
- Superfamily: Noctuoidea
- Family: Erebidae
- Subfamily: Arctiinae
- Genus: Aloa
- Species: A. collaris

Binomial name
- Aloa collaris Hampson, 1891

Species of moth

Aloa collaris is a moth of the family Erebidae. It was described by George Hampson in 1891. It is found in Hainan (southern China) and in southern India.
