= Ragi mudde =

Indian dish

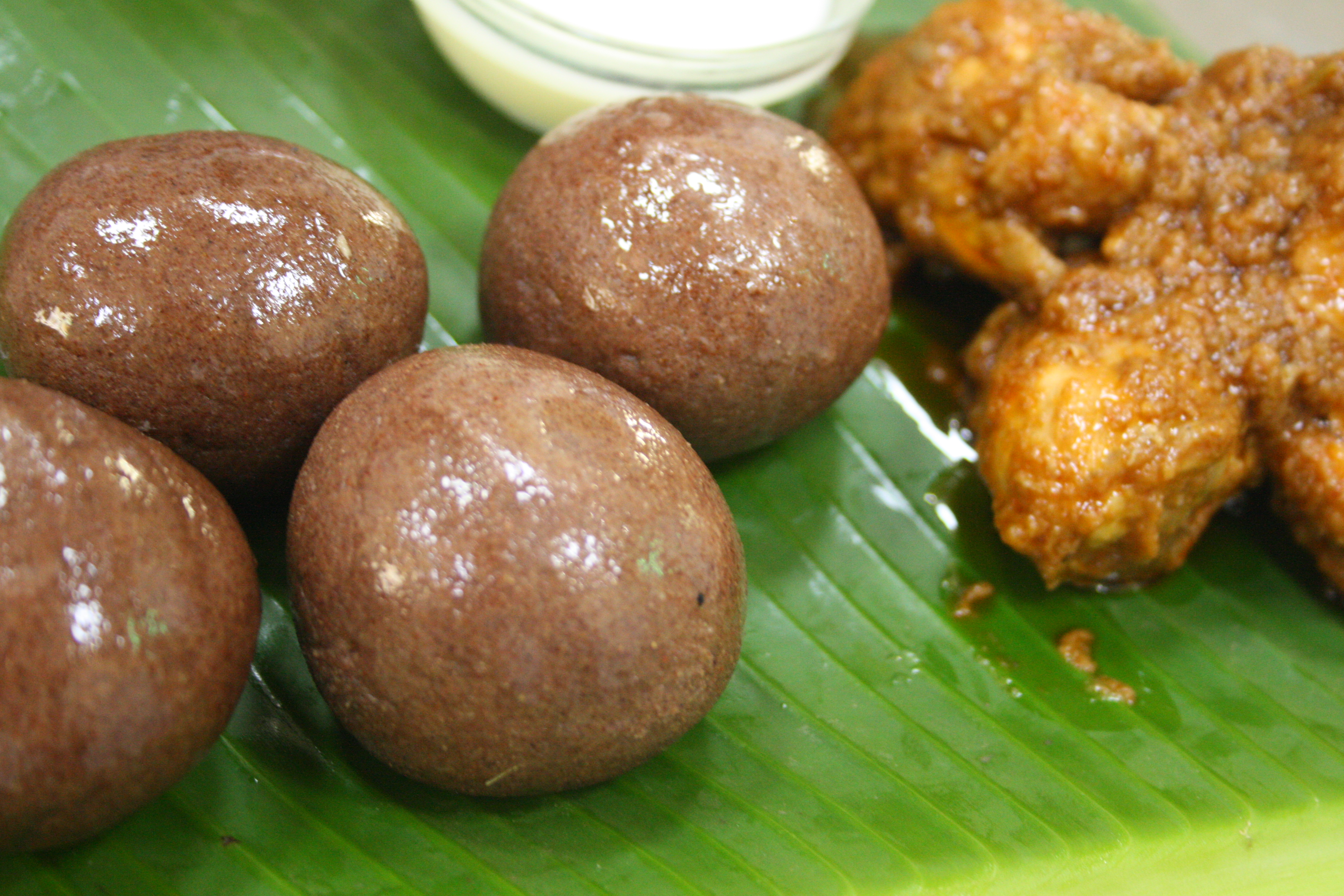
- Alternative names: Ragi sangati, ragi kali, baadi
- Course: Lunch or dinner
- Place of origin: India
- Region or state: Karnataka, Andhra and Telangana, Tamil Nadu
- Serving temperature: Hot
- Main ingredients: Finger millet
- Variations: Akki tari mudde (coarse rice flour), Jolada hittina (jorwar millet) mudde

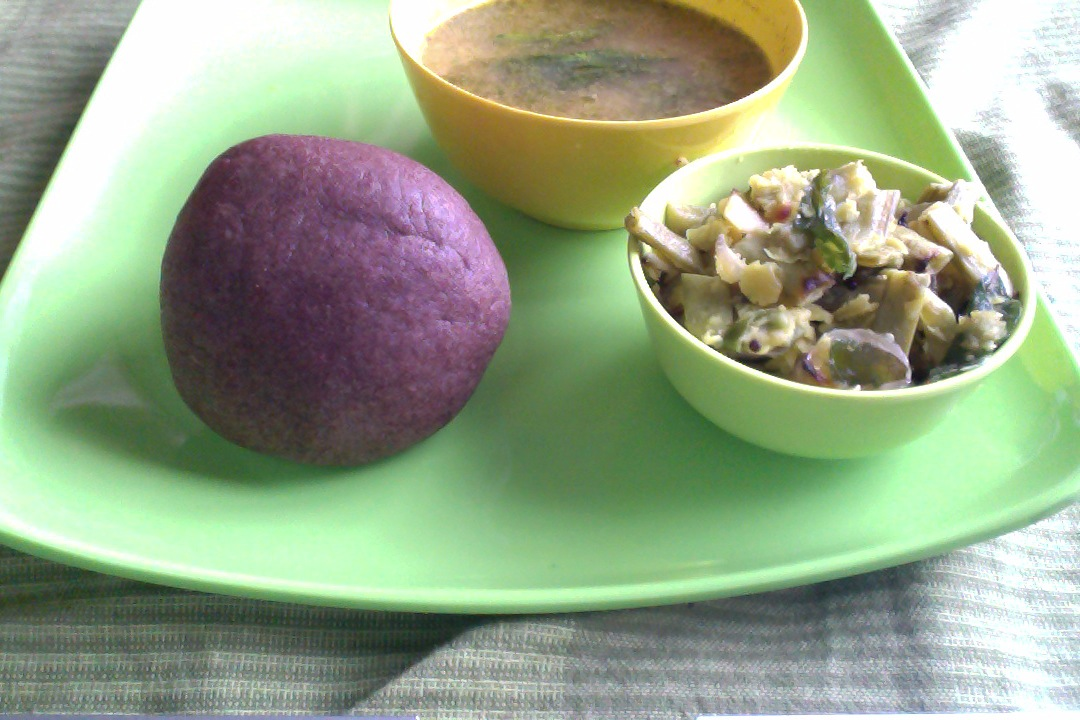
Ragi mudde – nati koli saaru (country chicken chowder) is the traditional South Karnataka meal among farming households.

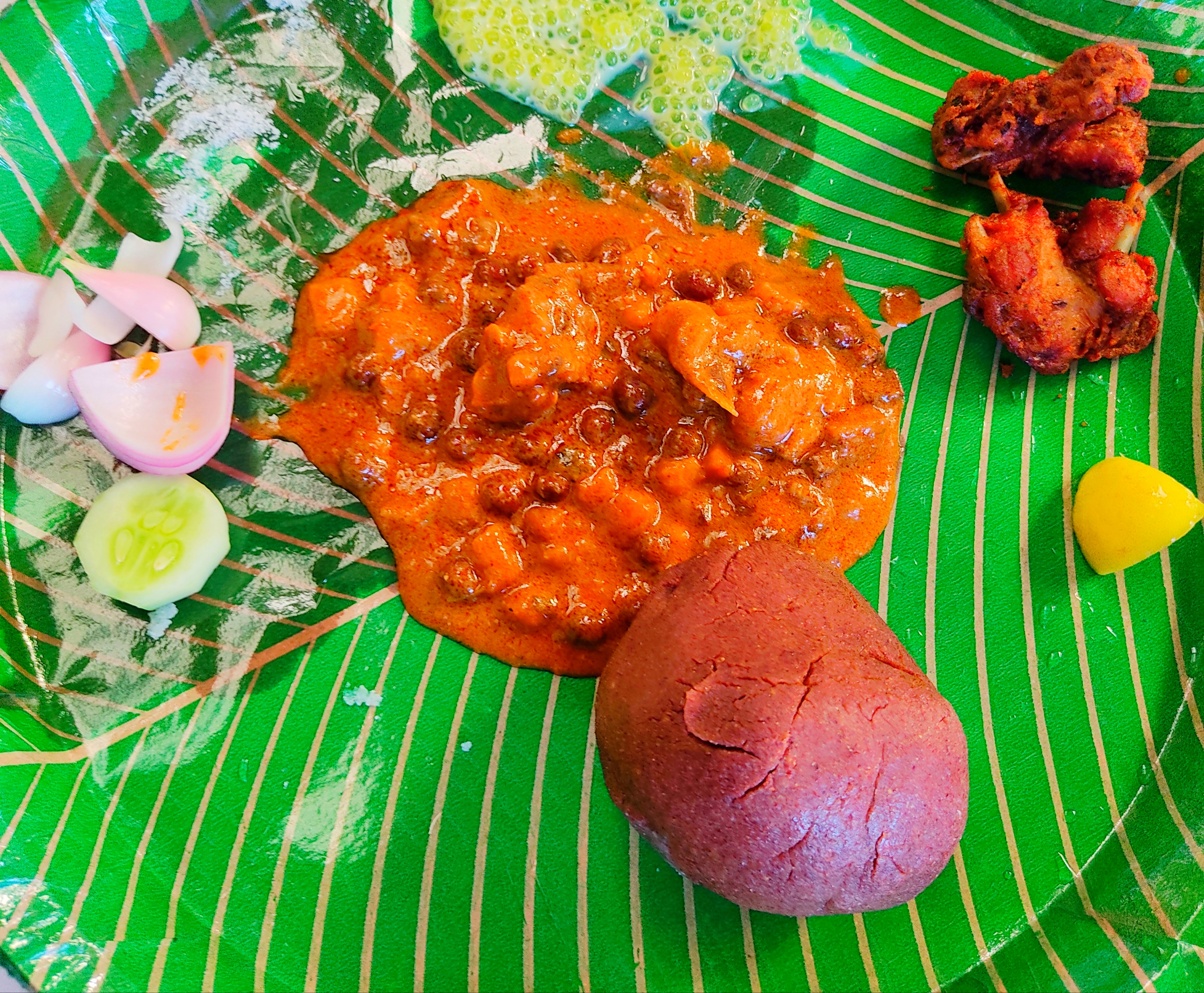
Typical Mandya style of ragi mudde, boti gojju

Ragi mudde, ragi sangati or ragi kali (Kannada: ಮುದ್ದೆ, Tamil: ராகி கழி), colloquially simply referred to as either mudde or hittu which means 'lump' or 'dough', is a finger millet swallow dish from South India. In Rayalaseema Region in Andhra Pradesh it is called Ragi Sangati. In Tamil Nadu, it is called ragi kali. Ragi mudde is a staple food in the districts of Mysuru, Mandya, Ramanagara, Chamarajanagar, Hassan, Tumakuru, Bengaluru Rural in Karnataka. A similar variation known as dhindo is also eaten in Northeast India, Nepal and Bhutan. In Uttarakhand and Himachal Pradesh in northern India, a similar variation is known as baadi and baari respectively.

== Preparation ==
Ragi mudde has only two ingredients: ragi (finger millet) flour, and water. A tablespoon of ragi flour is first mixed with water to make a very thin paste and later added to a thick-bottomed vessel containing water on a stove top. As this mixture boils and reaches the brim of the vessel, ragi flour is added, which forms a mound on top of boiling water. Once the ragi flour is added, it requires immediate mixing (to avoid lumps) with the help of a wooden stick (Kannada: ಮುದ್ದೆ ಕೋಲು: mudde kolu/Kannada: ಹಿಟ್ಟಿನ ದೊಣ್ಣೆ: hiṭṭin doṇṇe); the flour is beaten to a smooth dough-like consistency with no lumps. Then it is allowed to cook on medium-high flame. This hot dough is then rested on low heat before being rounded on a wooden board into tennis-ball-sized balls with wet hands. Thus prepared ragi balls are broken down into smaller balls using fingers and dipped into saaru (Kannada: ಸಾರು)/hesru (Kannada: ಹೆಸ್ರು),Thambuli, gojju. Ragi is not supposed to be chewed.

Mudde, by itself, does not have a strong taste. Ragi mudde is traditionally eaten with saaru (made of greens with sprouted grams [whole pulses], meat or vegetables), but can also be eaten with yogurt or buttermilk. The saaru is often flavoured by mixing a dash of spicy, freshly ground green-chilli paste (Kannada: ಖಾರ, khaara), in one's plate according to taste. Ragi mudde-bassaru is a popular combination among the farming communities in Karnataka. Bassaru is made from the decanted water that remains after an assortment of pulses are steamed, usually along with a couple of pods of garlic. This water takes up the earthy flavour of the pulses to nicely complement the earthy flavour of the mudde itself. Onions, red chillies, and some garlic are browned and then ground into a paste along with grated coconut. This is added to the water, and the mixture is finally seasoned with oggarane. The steamed pulses themselves are often used to prepare a dry side salad known as palya (Kannada: ಪಲ್ಯ).

There are numerous variations of bassaru, which each yield a differently named (usually, eponymous with the major ingredient) saaru. Bassaru is itself a portmanteau of bas(tira) (Kannada: ಬಸ್ತಿರ) ('steamed') and saaru. Uppesru (Kannada: ಉಪ್ಪೆಸ್ರು)/uppsaaru (Kannada: ಉಪ್ಪ್ಸಾರು) is another common accompaniment to mudde. This is often simply a stew comprising steamed horsegram, as well as the water used to steam it, with added salt. Sometimes, hyacinth beans (Kannada: ಅವರೇಕಾಳು avarekaaḷu) replace the horsegram. The horsegram version is also known as hurḷi saaru (Kannada: ಹುರಳಿ ಸಾರು).

Ragi mudde is rich in the same nutrients that are found in finger millet, namely fibre, calcium, and iron.

== Eaten with ==
Ragi mudde is consumed with the famous Karnataka-style upsaaru [Also known as "Sappneeru", a portmanteau of sappe meaning bland and neeru meaning water], bassaaru or nati koli saaru (chicken curry) or menthyada gojju (sweet and sour dish made of fenugreek and tamarind). In most of southern Karnataka/old Mysore it is eaten almost daily. Many luxury hotels serve ragi mudde on special occasions. In the Rayalaseema region of Andhra Pradesh, it is eaten with pappu and chatnee. Ragi sankati is also a main food in Anantapur and Annamayya districts. It is served in almost all hotels in Anantapur district.

== See also ==
- Ragi rotti
- Upsaaru
- Cuisine of Karnataka
- Dhindo, a similar Nepali dish
