= Micraloa emittens =

Scientific classification
- Kingdom: Animalia
- Phylum: Arthropoda
- Class: Insecta
- Order: Lepidoptera
- Superfamily: Noctuoidea
- Family: Erebidae
- Subfamily: Arctiinae
- Genus: Micraloa
- Species: M. emittens

Binomial name
- Micraloa emittens (Walker, 1855)

Synonyms
- Creatonotos emittens Walker, 1855; Aloa emittens; Aloa flora Swinhoe, 1885

Species of moth

Micraloa emittens is a moth of the family Erebidae. It was described by Francis Walker in 1855. It is found in India and Sri Lanka.

In The Fauna of British India, Including Ceylon and Burma: Moths Volume II, the species described with Micraloa lineola, as follows:

Antennae of male bipectinate, serrate in female. Head and thorax pinkish ochreous. Abdomen crimson above with series of dorsal and lateral black spots. Fore wing pinkish ochreous. A black fascia below median nervure from before the middle of cell to some way beyond its lower angle, the veins crossing it pale; a black sunmarginal streak above vein 5. Hind wing whitish, some specimens with a black spots at end of cell. The S.Indian and Ceylon (now Sri Lanka) forms emittens and flora are much suffused with pink than the Northern forms; in the former the markings of the fore wing are prominent, in the latter obsolete or only developed at end of cell. Of the Northern forms, diminutus has the markings prominent; candidulus narrow or almost obsolete; puntistriga with a speck at end of cell and streak above vein 5 only.
