= Paramsacta moorei =

Scientific classification
- Domain: Eukaryota
- Kingdom: Animalia
- Phylum: Arthropoda
- Class: Insecta
- Order: Lepidoptera
- Superfamily: Noctuoidea
- Family: Erebidae
- Subfamily: Arctiinae
- Genus: Paramsacta
- Species: P. moorei

Binomial name
- Paramsacta moorei (Butler, 1875)

Synonyms
- Areas moorei Butler, 1875; Amsacta moorei (Butler, 1875); Aloa moorei (Butler, 1875); Aloa sara Swinhoe, 1889

Species of moth

Paramsacta moorei is a moth of the family Erebidae. It was described by Arthur Gardiner Butler in 1875. It is found in India and Pakistan. It has been recorded as a pest of finger millet, sorghum and pearl millet.
