= Micraloa lineola =

Scientific classification
- Kingdom: Animalia
- Phylum: Arthropoda
- Class: Insecta
- Order: Lepidoptera
- Superfamily: Noctuoidea
- Family: Erebidae
- Subfamily: Arctiinae
- Genus: Micraloa
- Species: M. lineola

Binomial name
- Micraloa lineola (Fabricius, 1793)

Synonyms
- Bombyx lineola Fabricius, 1793; Aloa lineola (Fabricius, 1793); Micraloa lineola; Spilosoma punctistriga Walker, 1855; Aloa candidula Walker, 1855; Aloa diminuta Walker, 1855; Spilosoma strigata Walker, 1869; Creatonotus rubricosta Moore, 1872; Aloa insolata Swinhoe, 1889; Diacrisia felderi Rothschild, 1910; Estigmene octomaculata Rothschild, 1933

Moth

Micraloa lineola is a moth of the family Erebidae. It was described by Johan Christian Fabricius in 1793. It is found in India, Nepal, Sri Lanka and Myanmar.

In, The Fauna of British India, Including Ceylon and Burma: Moths Volume II, the species is described with Micraloa emittens, as follows:

Antennae of male bipectinate, serrate in female. Head and thorax pinkish ochreous. Abdomen crimson above with series of dorsal and lateral black spots. Fore wing pinkish ochreous. A black fascia below median nervure from before the middle of cell to some way beyond its lower angle, the veins crossing it pale; a black sunmarginal streak above vein 5. Hind wing whitish, some specimens with a black spots at end of cell. The S.Indian and Ceylon (now Sri Lanka) forms emittens and flora are much suffused with pink than the Northern forms; in the former the markings of the fore wing are prominent, in the latter obsolete or only developed at end of cell. Of the Northern forms, diminutus has the markings prominent; candidulus narrow or almost obsolete; puntistriga with a speck at end of cell and streak above vein 5 only.
