= Amsacta albistriga =

Red hairy caterpillar

Scientific classification
- Kingdom: Animalia
- Phylum: Arthropoda
- Class: Insecta
- Order: Lepidoptera
- Superfamily: Noctuoidea
- Family: Erebidae
- Subfamily: Arctiinae
- Genus: Amsacta
- Species: A. albistriga

Binomial name
- Amsacta albistriga (Walker, [1865])

Synonyms
- Aloa albistriga Walker, [1865]

Species of moth

Amsacta albistriga, the red hairy caterpillar, is a moth of the family Erebidae. It is found in southern India, where it has been recorded feeding on finger millet and sorghum.

The wingspan is 40–50 mm (1.6–2.0 in).

The larvae defoliate various agricultural crops. After about thirty to forty days of feeding the larvae burrow into the soil to pupate.
