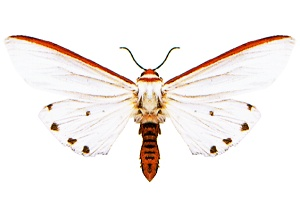

Scientific classification
- Domain: Eukaryota
- Kingdom: Animalia
- Phylum: Arthropoda
- Class: Insecta
- Order: Lepidoptera
- Superfamily: Noctuoidea
- Family: Erebidae
- Subfamily: Arctiinae
- Genus: Paramsacta
- Species: P. marginata

Binomial name
- Paramsacta marginata (Donovan, 1805)

Synonyms
- Phalaena marginata; Aloa marginata; Areas roseicostis; Areas punctipennis; Amsacta flaveola; Paramsacta pura; Amsacta eurymochla

= Paramsacta marginata =

Donovan's tiger moth

Species of moth

Paramsacta marginata, also called Donovan's tiger moth or Donovan's amsacta, is a moth of the family Erebidae. It is found in most of Australia, New Guinea, Fergusson Island and the Louisiade Archipelago. The species was first described by Edward Donovan in 1805.

The larvae feed on Asteraceae, Boraginaceae, Euphorbiaceae, Fabaceae, Plantaginaceae, Polygonaceae and Portulacaceae species.
