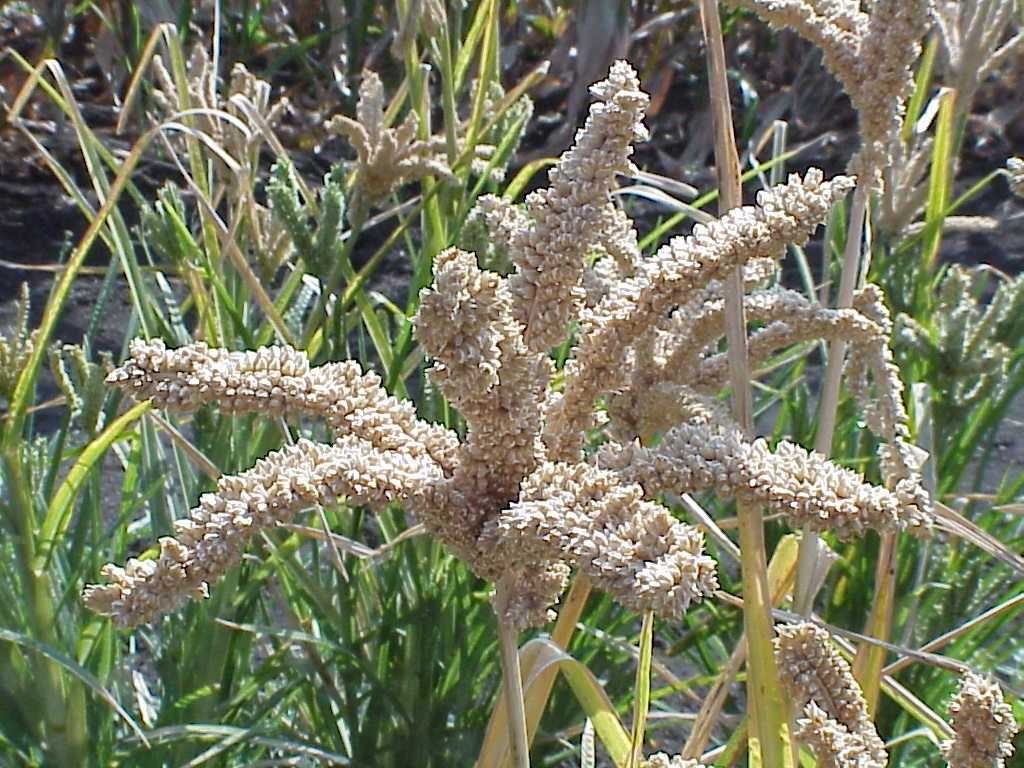

Scientific classification
- Kingdom: Plantae
- Clade: Tracheophytes
- Clade: Angiosperms
- Clade: Monocots
- Clade: Commelinids
- Order: Poales
- Family: Poaceae
- Subfamily: Chloridoideae
- Genus: Eleusine
- Species: E. coracana

Binomial name
- Eleusine coracana Gaertn.

Synonyms
- Cynodon coracanus Raspail; Cynosurus coracanus L.; Eleusine cerealis Salisb. nom. illeg.; Eleusine dagussa Schimp.; Eleusine luco Welw. nom. inval.; Eleusine ovalis Ehrenb. ex Sweet nom. inval.; Eleusine pilosa Gilli; Eleusine reniformis Divak.; Eleusine sphaerosperma Stokes nom. illeg.; Eleusine stricta Roxb.; Eleusine tocussa Fresen.

= Finger millet =

Species of grass

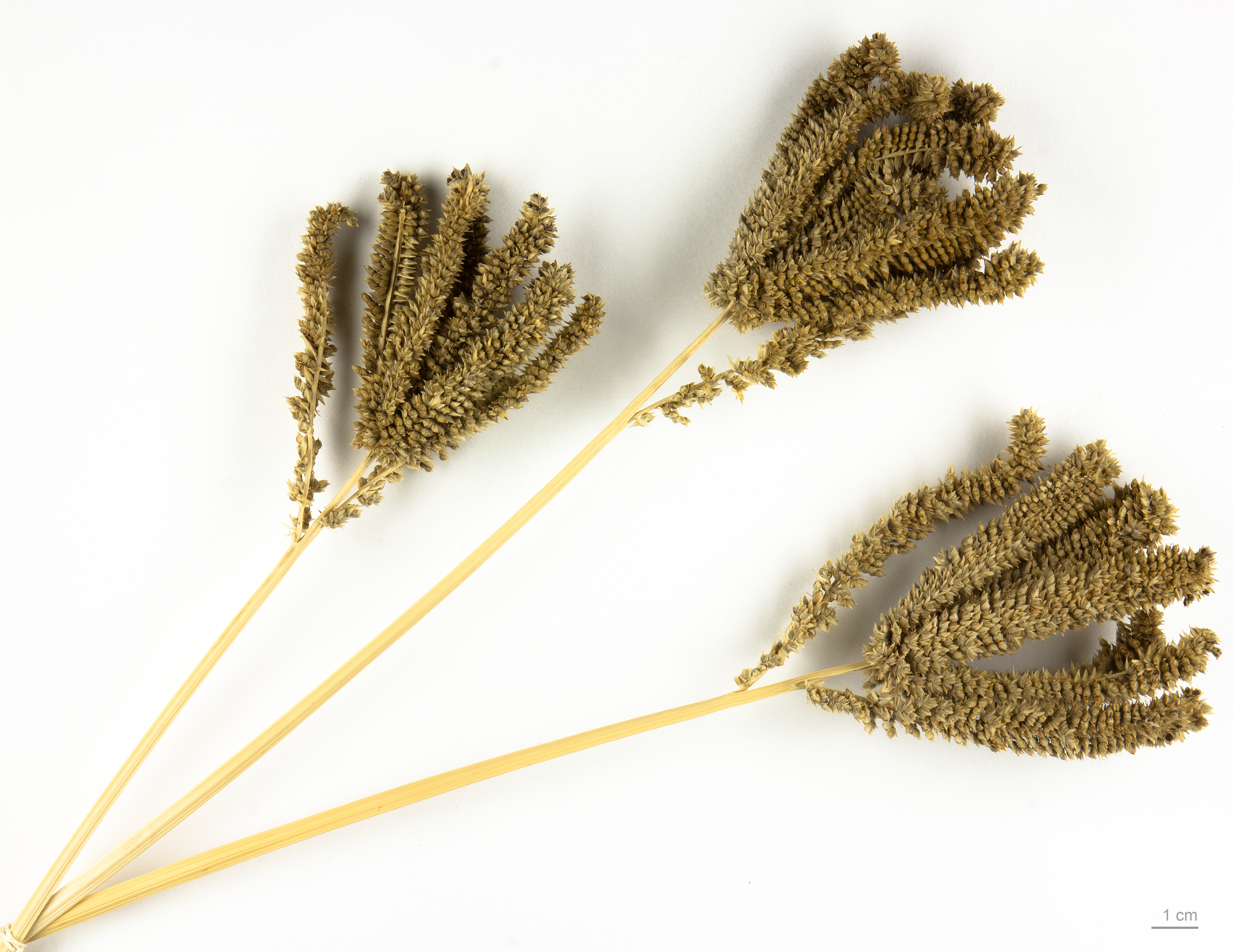
Eleusine coracana (MHNT)

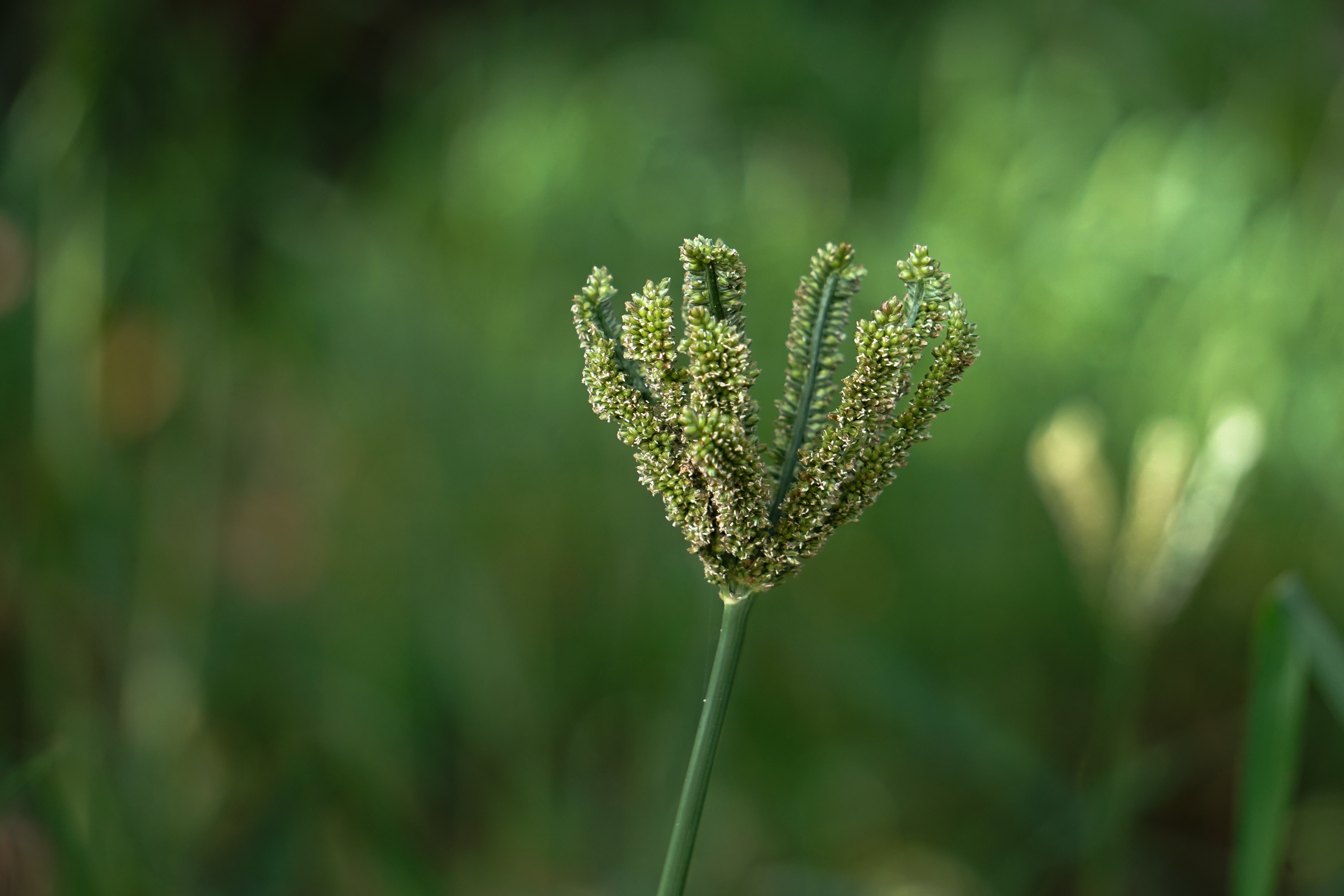
Eleusine coracana (L.) Gaertn., inflorescence.

Finger millet (Eleusine coracana) is an annual herbaceous plant. It is a tetraploid and self-pollinating species probably evolved from its wild relative Eleusine africana.

Finger millet is native to the Ethiopian and Ugandan highlands. It has the ability to withstand cultivation at altitudes over 2,000 metres (6,600 ft) above sea level and a high drought tolerance. The grain is suitable for decades-long storage. It is widely grown as a cereal crop in the arid and semiarid areas in Africa and Asia.

== Taxonomy ==
Finger millet is under the genus Eleusine Gaertn.

== Cultivation ==
=== History ===
Finger millet originated in East Africa (Ethiopian and Ugandan highlands). It probably evolved from its wild relative Eleusine africana. It was claimed to have been found in an Indian archaeological site dated to 1800 BCE (Late Bronze Age); however, this was subsequently demonstrated to be incorrectly identified cleaned grains of hulled millets. The earliest record of finger millet comes from an archaeological site in Africa which is thought to date to the 3rd millennium BCE, although it has not been precisely dated.

By 1996, cultivation of finger millet in Africa was declining rapidly because of the large amount of labor it required, with farmers preferring to grow nutritionally inferior but less labor-intensive crops such as maize, sorghum, and cassava. Such a decline was not seen in Asia, however.

=== Growing regions ===
Main cultivation areas are parts of eastern and southern Africa – particularly Uganda, Kenya, the Democratic Republic of the Congo, Zimbabwe, Zambia, Malawi, and Tanzania – and parts of India and Nepal. It is also grown in southern Sudan and "as far south" in Africa as Mozambique.

=== Climate requirements ===
Finger millet is a short-day plant with a growing optimum 12 hours' daylight for most varieties. Its main growing area ranges from 20°N to 20°S, but it is found to be grown at 30°N in the Himalaya region (India and Nepal). It is generally considered a drought-tolerant crop, but compared with other millets, such as pearl millet and sorghum, it prefers moderate rainfall (500 mm or 20 in annually). The majority of worldwide finger millet farmers grow it rainfed, although yields often can be significantly improved when irrigation is applied. In India, finger millet is a typical rabi (dry, winter season) crop. Heat tolerance of finger millet is high. For Ugandan finger millet varieties, for instance, the optimal average growth temperature ranges at about 27 °C, while the minimal temperatures should not be lower than 18 °C. Relative to other species (pearl millet and sorghum), finger millet has a higher tolerance to cool temperatures. It is grown from about 500 to 2,400 metres (1,600 to 7,900 ft) above sea level (e.g. in the Himalaya region). Hence, it can be cultivated on higher elevations than most tropical crops. Finger millet can grow on various soils, including highly weathered tropical lateritic soils. It thrives in free-draining soils with steady moisture levels. Furthermore, it can tolerate soil salinity up to a certain extent. Its ability to bear waterlogging is limited, so good drainage of the soils and moderate water-holding capacity are optimal. Finger millet can tolerate moderately acidic soils (pH 5), but also moderately alkaline soils (pH 8.2).

=== Cropping systems ===
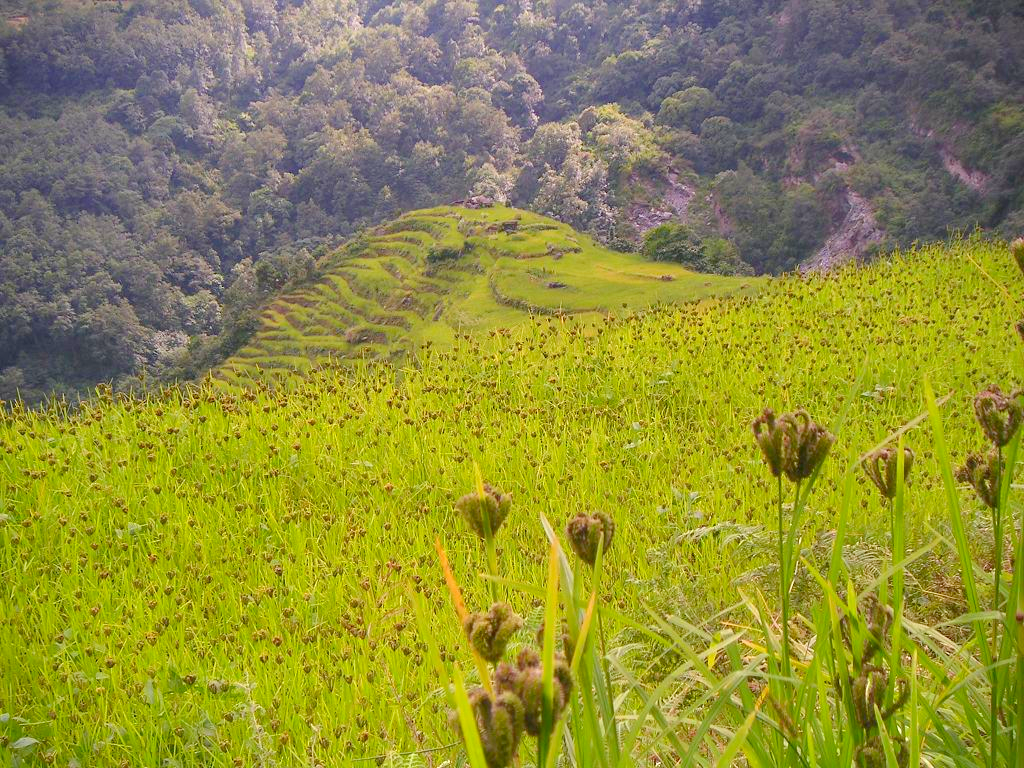
Fields of finger millet in the Annapurna region of Nepal

Finger millet monocrops grown under rainfed conditions are most common in drier areas of Eastern Africa. In addition, intercropping with legumes, such as cowpea or pigeon pea, are also quite common in East Africa. Tropical Central Africa supports scattered regions of finger millet intercropping mostly with legumes, but also with cassava, plantain, and vegetables.

=== Weeds ===
Weeds are the major biotic stresses for finger millet cultivation. Its seeds are very small, which leads to a relatively slow development in early growing stages. This makes finger millet a weak competitor for light, water, and nutrients compared with weeds. In East and Southern Africa, the closely related species Eleusine indica (common name Indian goose grass) is a severe weed competitor of finger millet. Especially in early growing stages of the crop and the weed and when broadcast seeding instead of row seeding is applied (as often the case in East Africa), the two species are very difficult to distinguish. Besides Eleusine indica, the species Xanthium strumarium, which is animal dispersed and the stolon-owning species Cyperus rotondus and Cynodon dactylon are important finger millet weeds. Measures to control weeds include cultural, physical, and chemical methods. Cultural methods could be sowing in rows instead of broadcast sowing to make distinction between finger millet seedlings and E. indica easier when hand weeding. ICRISAT promotes cover crops and crop rotations to disrupt the growing cycle of the weeds. Physical weed control in financial resource-limited communities growing finger millet are mainly hand weeding or weeding with a hand hoe.

=== Diseases and pests ===
Finger millet is generally seen as not very prone to diseases and pests. Nonetheless, finger millet blast, caused by the fungal pathogen Magnaporthe grisea (anamorph Pyricularia grisea), can locally cause severe damages, especially when untreated. In Uganda, yield losses up to 80% were reported in bad years. The pathogen leads to drying out of leaves, neck rots, and ear rots. These symptoms can drastically impair photosynthesis, translocation of photosynthetic assimilates, and grain filling, so reduce yield and grain quality. Finger millet blast can also infest finger millet weeds such as the closely related E. indica, E. africana, Digitaria spp., Setaria spp., and Doctylocterium spp. Finger millet blast can be controlled with cultural measures, chemical treatments, and the use of resistant varieties. Researchers in Kenya have screened wild relatives of finger millet and landraces for resistance to blast. Cultural measures to control finger millet blast suggested by ICRISAT for Eastern Africa include crop rotations with nonhost crops such as legumes, deep ploughing under of finger millet straw on infected fields, washing of field tools after use to prevent dissemination of the pathogen to uninfected fields, weed control to reduce infections by weed hosts, and avoiding of high plant densities to impede the pathogen dispersal from plant to plant. Chemical measures can be direct spraying of systemic fungicides, such as the active ingredients pyroquilon or seed dressings with fungicides, such as trycyclozole.

Striga, a parasitic weed which occurs naturally in parts of Africa, Asia, and Australia, can severely affect the crop and yield losses in finger millet and other cereals by 20 to 80%. Striga can be controlled with limited success by hand weeding, herbicide application, crop rotations, improved soil fertility, intercropping and biological control. The most economically feasible and environmentally friendly control measure would be to develop and use Striga-resistant cultivars. Striga resistant genes have not been identified yet in cultivated finger millet but could be found in crop wild relatives of finger millet. Another pathogen in finger millet cultivation is the fungus Helminthosporium nodulosum, causing leaf blight. Finger millet pests are bird predators, such as quelea in East Africa.

=== Insects ===
The pink stem borer (Sesamia inferens) and the finger millet shoot fly (Atherigona miliaceae) are considered as the most relevant insect pests in finger millet cultivation. Measures to control Sesamia inferens are uprooting of infected plants, destroying of stubbles, having a crop rotation, chemical control with insecticides, biological measures such as pheromone traps, or biological pest control with the use of antagonistic organisms (e.g. Sturmiopsis inferens).

Other insect pests include:

- Root feeders
  - root aphid Tetraneura nigriabdominalis
- Shoot and stem feeders
  - Atherigona miliaceae and Atherigona soccata
  - Sesamia inferens
  - stem weevil Listronotus bonariensis
- Leaf feeders
  - hairy caterpillars, Amsacta albistriga, Amsacta transiens, and Amsacta moorei
  - cutworms, Agrotis ipsilon
  - armyworm larvae of Spodoptera exempta, Spodoptera mauritia, and Mythimna separata
  - leaf-folder Cnaphalocrocis medinalis larvae
  - skipper Pelopidas mathias larvae
  - grasshoppers, Chrotogonus hemipterus, Nomadacris septemfasciata, and Locusta migratoria
  - beetle grubs of Chnootriba similis
  - thrip, Heliothrips indicus
- Sucking pests
  - aphids, Hysteroneura setariae, Metopolophium dirhodum, Rhopalosiphum maidis, and Sitobion miscanthi
  - mealy bug, Brevennia rehi
  - leaf hoppers Cicadulina bipunctella and Cicadulina chinai

=== Propagation and sowing ===
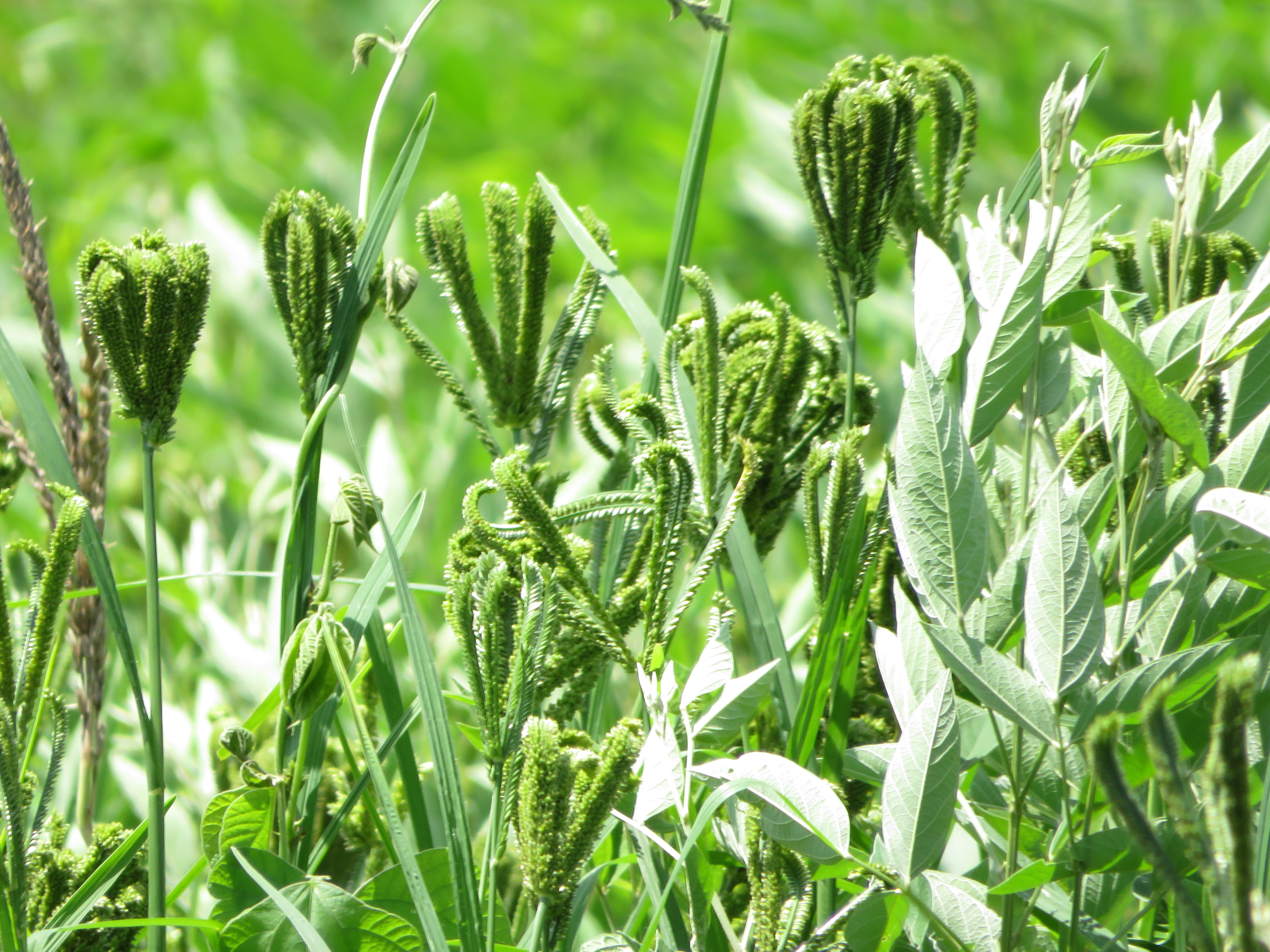
Ragi Plant

Propagation in finger millet farming is done mainly by seeds. In rainfed cropping, four sowing methods are used:

- Broadcasting: Seeds are directly sown in the field. This is the common method because it is the easiest way and no special machinery is required. The organic weed management with this method is a problem, because it is difficult to distinguish between weed and crop.
- Line Sowing: Improved sowing compared to broadcasting. Facilitates organic weed management due to better distinction of weed and crop. In this method, spacing of 22 cm to 30 cm between lines and 8 cm to 10 cm within lines should be maintained. The seeds should be sown about 3 cm deep in the soil.
- Drilling in rows: Seeds are sown directly in the untreated soil by using a direct-seed drill. This method is used in conservation agriculture.
- Transplanting the seedlings: Raising the seedlings in nursery beds and transplant to the main field. Leveling and watering of beds is required during transplanting. Seedlings with 4 weeks age should be transplanted in the field. For early Rabi and Kharif season, seedlings should be transplanted at 25 cm x 10 cm and for late Kharif season at 30 cm x 10 cm. Planting should be done 3 cm depth in the soil

=== Harvest ===
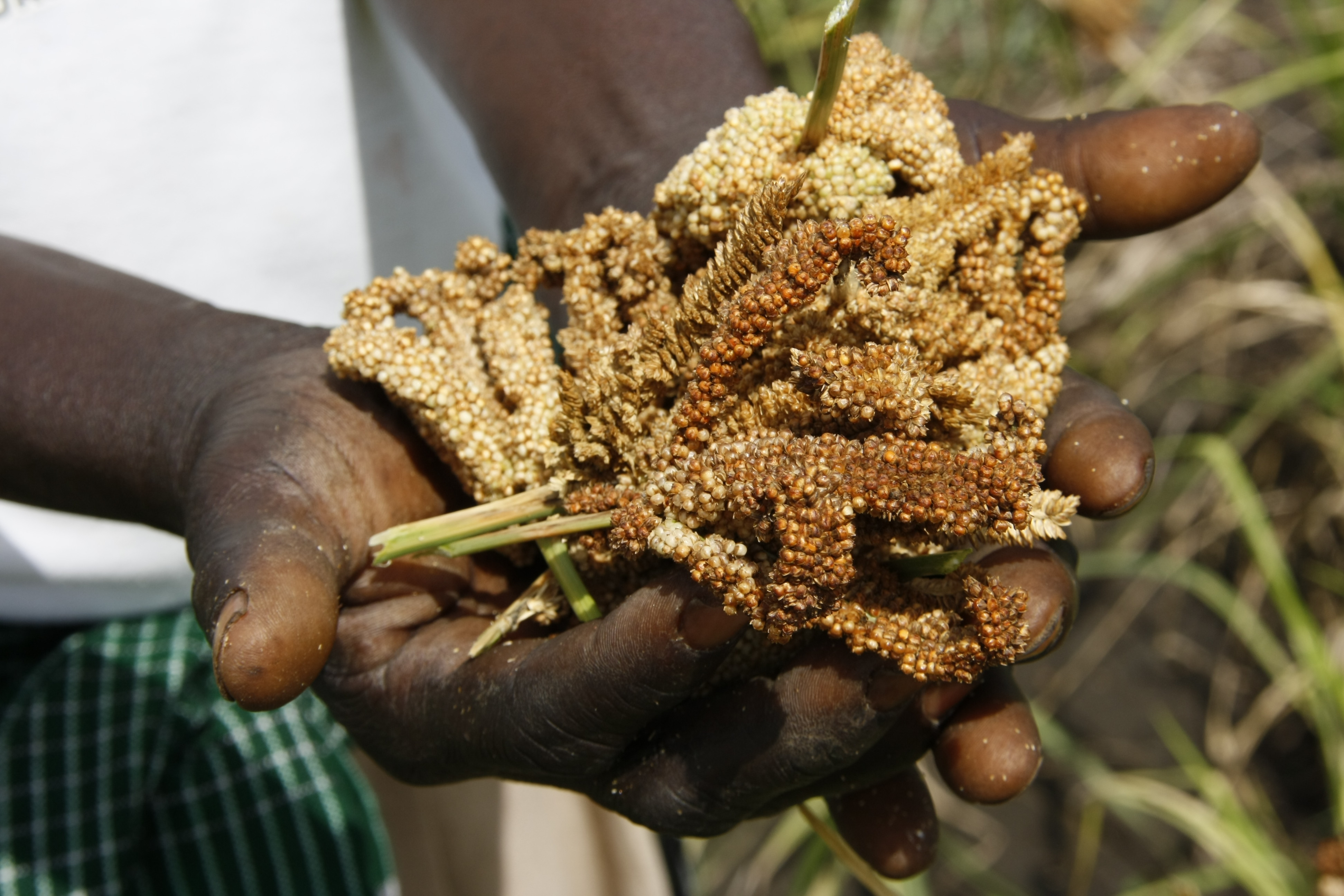
Finger millet sprays in Uganda

Crop does not mature uniformly and hence the harvest is to be taken up in two stages. When the earhead on the main shoot and 50% of the earheads on the crop turn brown, the crop is ready for the first harvest. At the first harvest, all earheads that have turned brown should be cut. After this drying, threshing and cleaning the grains by winnowing. The second harvest is around seven days after the first. All earheads, including the green ones, should be cut. The grains should then be cured to obtain maturity by heaping the harvested earheads in shade for one day without drying, so that the humidity and temperature increase and the grains get cured. After this drying, threshing and cleaning as after the first harvesting.

=== Storage ===
Once harvested, the seeds keep extremely well and are seldom attacked by insects or moulds. Finger millet can be kept for up to 10 years when it is unthreshed. Some sources report a storage duration up to 50 years under good storage conditions. The long storage capacity makes finger millet an important crop in risk-avoidance strategies as a famine crop for farming communities.

=== Malting ===
Germinating the seed, also called malting, is common in the production of brewed beer. When finger millet is germinated, enzymes are activated, which transfer starches into other carbohydrates such as sugars. Finger millet has a good malting activity. The malted finger millet can be used as a substrate to produce for example gluten-free beer or easily digestible food for infants.

== Uses ==
=== Nutrition ===
Finger millet
Nutritional value per 100 g (3.5 oz)
- Energy: 1,283 kJ (307 kcal)
- Carbohydrates: 53.5 g
- Dietary fiber: 22.6 g
- Fat: 1.9 g
- Protein: 7.4 g
Vitamins and minerals
| Minerals | Quantity %DV^{†} |
| Calcium | 26% 344 mg |
| Iron | 63% 11.3 mg |
| Magnesium | 37% 154 mg |
| Phosphorus | 15% 183 mg |
| Potassium | 18% 538 mg |
| Sodium | 0% 2 mg |
| Zinc | 15% 1.7 mg |
- Other constituents: Quantity
- Water: 11 g
- Link to the report by the Biodiversity for Food and Nutrition Project
- ^{†}Percentages estimated using US recommendations for adults, except for potassium, which is estimated based on expert recommendation from the National Academies.

Finger millet is 11% water, 7% protein, 54% carbohydrates, and 2% fat (table). In a 100 gram (3.5 oz) reference amount, finger millet supplies 305 calories, and is a rich source (20% or more of the Daily Value, DV) of dietary fiber and several dietary minerals, especially iron at 87% DV (table).

The International Crops Research Institute for the Semi-Arid Tropics (ICRISAT), a member of the CGIAR consortium, partners with farmers, governments, researchers and NGOs to help farmers grow nutritious crops, including finger millet. This helps their communities have more balanced diets and become more resilient to pests and drought. For example, the Harnessing Opportunities for Productivity Enhancement of Sorghum and Millets in Sub-Saharan Africa and South Asia (HOPE) project is increasing yields of finger millet in Tanzania by encouraging farmers to grow improved varieties.

=== Culinary ===
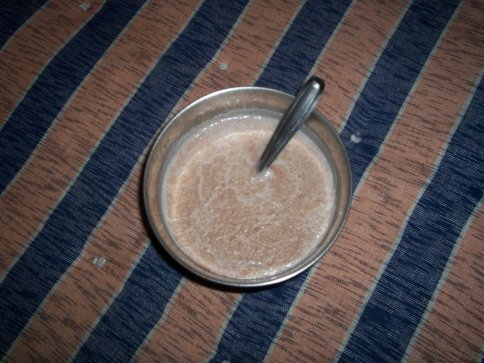
Finger millet in its commonly consumed form as a porridge

Finger millet can be ground into a flour and cooked into cakes, puddings or porridge. The flour is made into a fermented drink (or beer) in Nepal and in many parts of Africa. The straw from finger millet is used as animal fodder.

==== In India ====
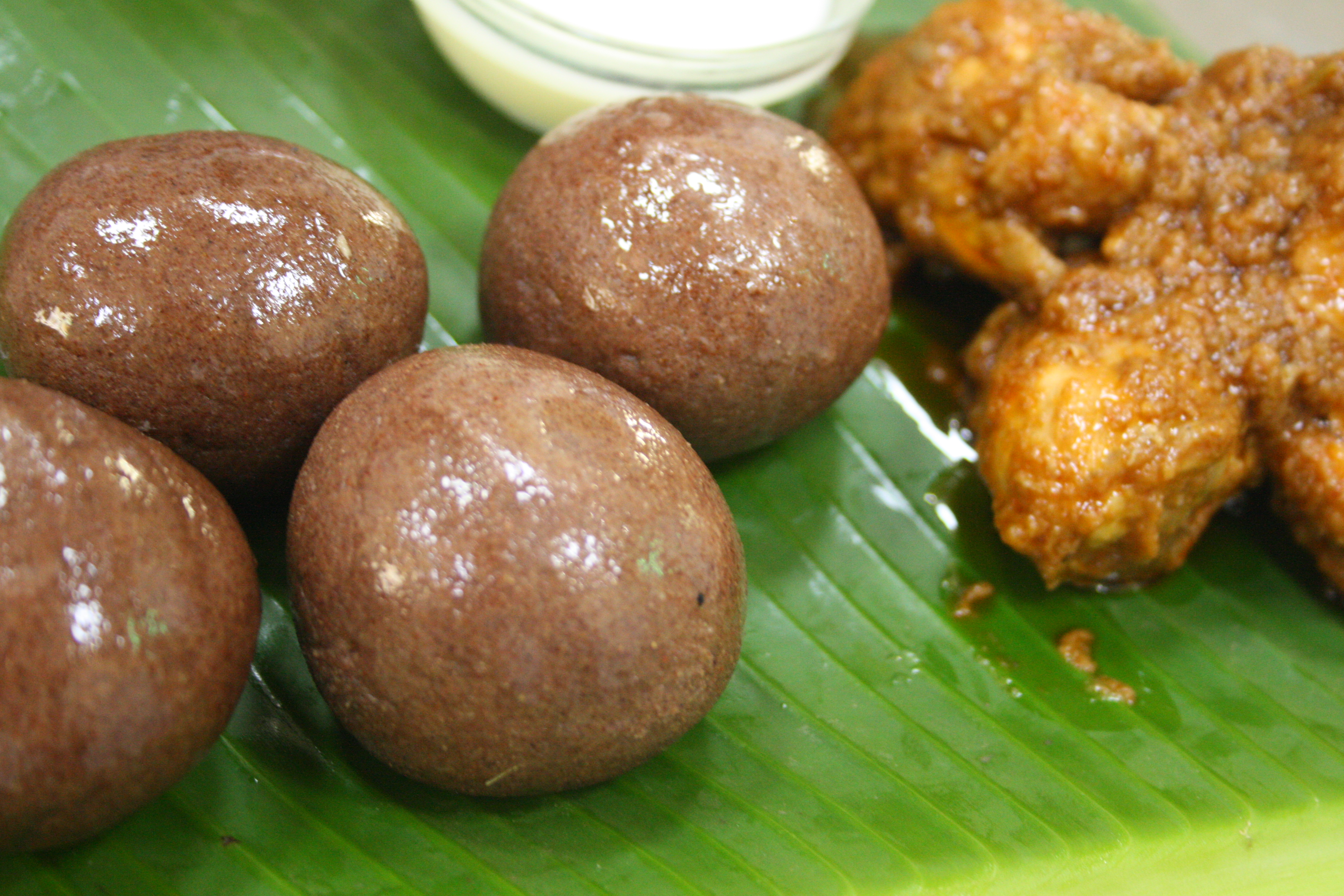
Balls of dense finger millet porridge (ragi mudde) in Karnataka

Finger millet is a staple grain in many parts of India, especially Karnataka, where it is known as ragi (from Kannada ರಾಗಿ rāgi). It is malted and its grain is ground into flour. There are numerous ways to prepare finger millet, including porridge, dosa and idli. In southern India, finger millet is used as baby food, because of millet's high nutritional content, especially iron and calcium. Finger millet flour can also be used as a gluten-free substitute for wheat flour in baking to prepare cake and biscuits, and has been promoted as a superfood.

In Karnataka, finger millet is generally consumed in the form of a thick porridge called ragi mudde in Kannada. It is the staple diet of many residents of South Karnataka. Mudde is prepared by cooking finger millet flour with water to achieve a dough-like consistency. This is then rolled into balls of desired size and consumed with sambar (huli), saaru (ಸಾರು), or curries.

The same dish is also eaten in Tamil Nadu, where finger millet is called kezhvaragu (கேழ்வரகு), keppai, koozh or ariyam, and the balls are known as keppai kali or simply kali. It is eaten with sambar or kuzhambu. For children, ragi is also fed with milk and sugar (malt).

In Andhra Pradesh, ragi sankati or ragi muddha – ragi balls – are eaten in the morning with chilli, onions, and sambar. In Kerala, puttu, a traditional breakfast dish, can be made with ragi flour and grated coconut, which is then steamed in a cylindrical steamer. In the tribal and western hilly regions of Odisha, ragi or mandiaa is a staple food. In the Garhwal and Kumaon regions of Uttarakhand, koda or maduwa is made into thick rotis (served with ghee), and also made into badi, which is similar to halwa but without sugar.

==== In Nepal ====
In Nepal, a thick dough (ḍhĩḍo) made of millet flour (kōdō) is cooked and eaten by hand. The dough, on other hand, can be made into thick bread (rotee) spread over flat utensil and heating it. Fermented millet is used to make a beer chhaang and the mash is distilled to make a liquor (शी rakśi). Whole grain millet is fermented to make tongba. Its use in holy Hindu practices is barred especially by upper castes. In Nepal, the National Plant Genetic Resource Centre at Khumaltar maintains 877 accessions (samples) of Nepalese finger millet (kodo).

== Gallery ==
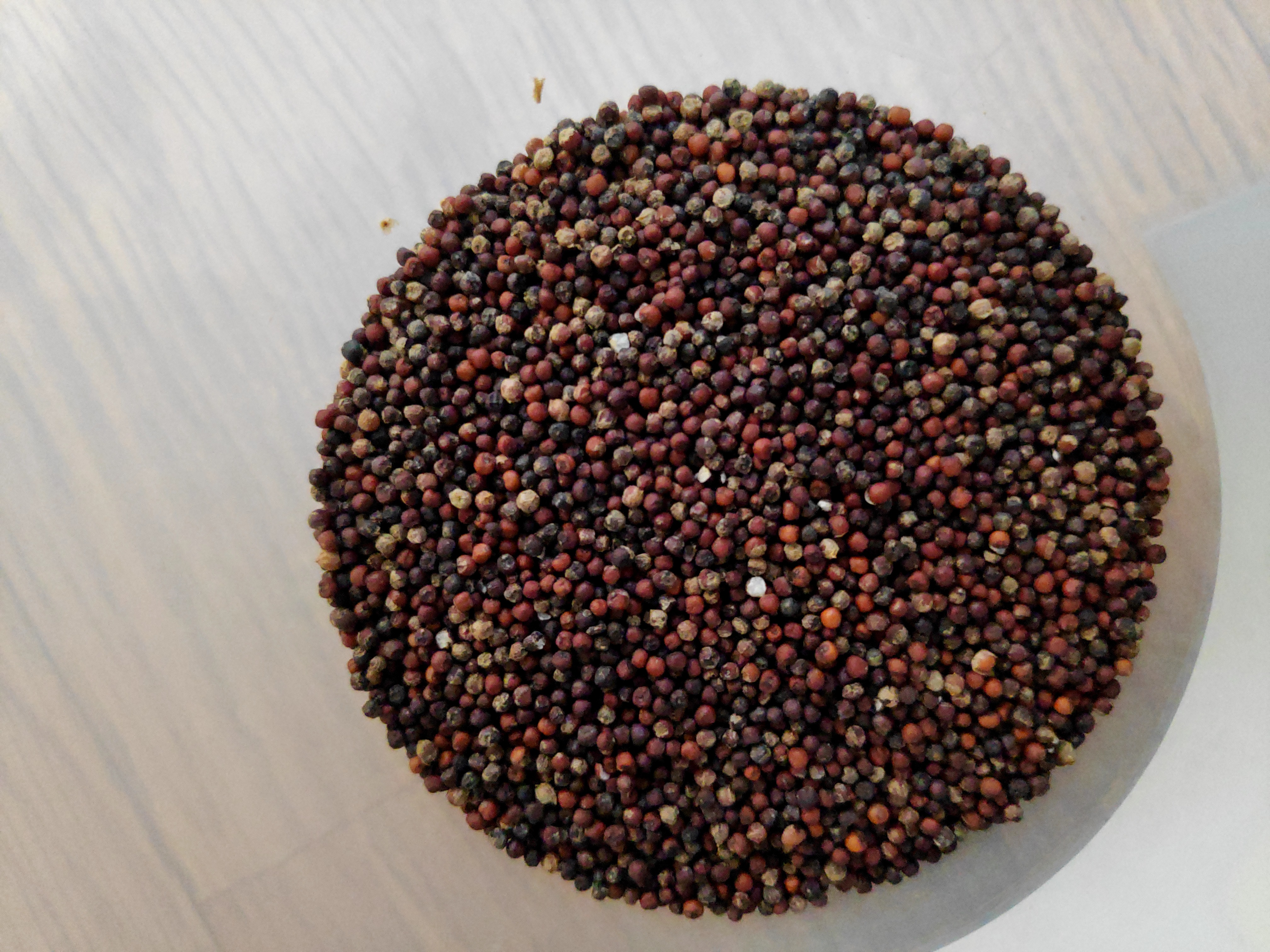
Finger millet

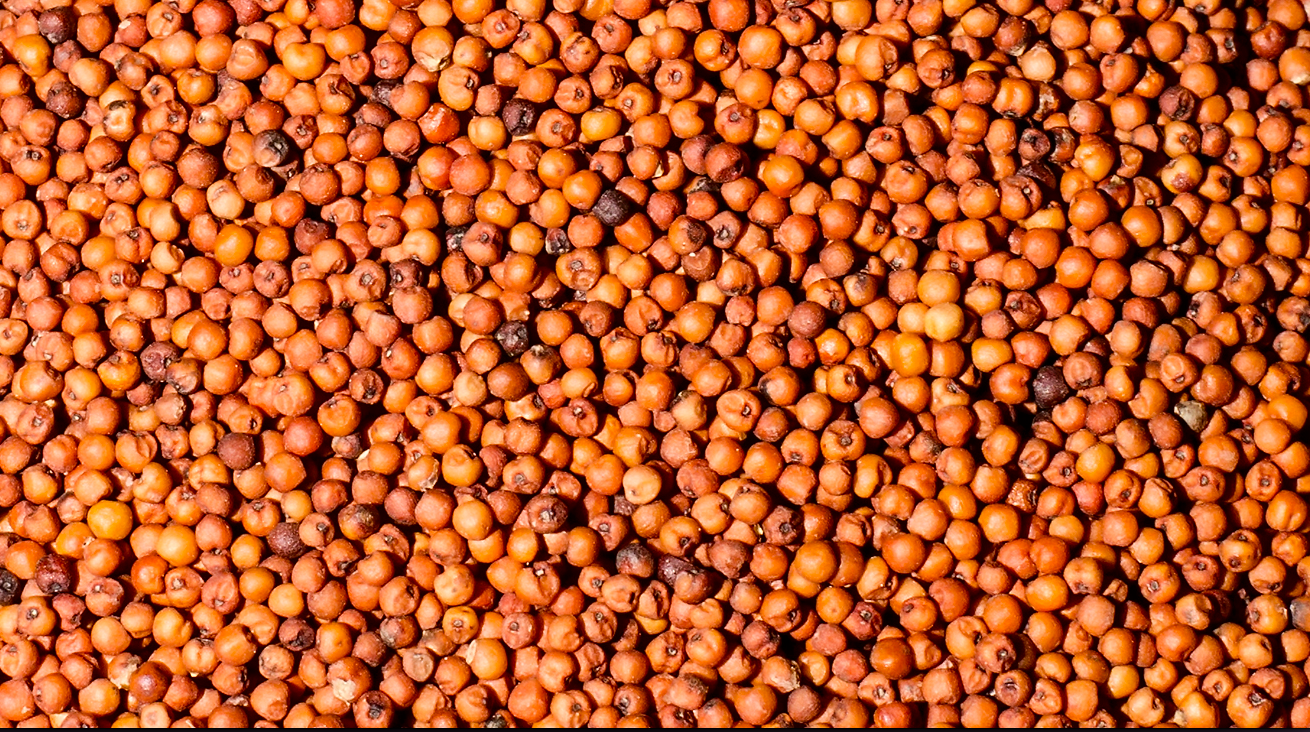
Multicolored finger millet grains

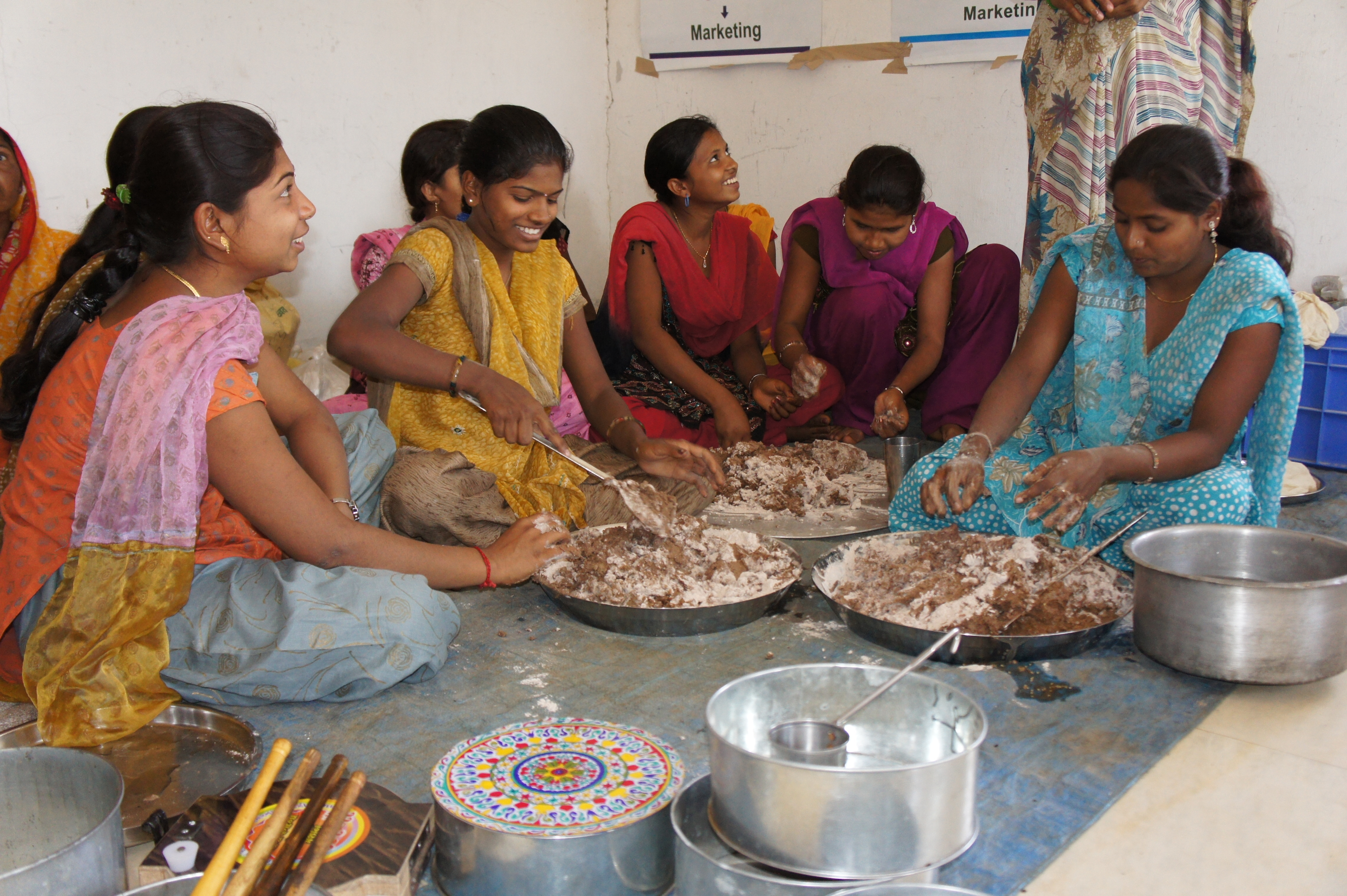
Pappad made of finger millet

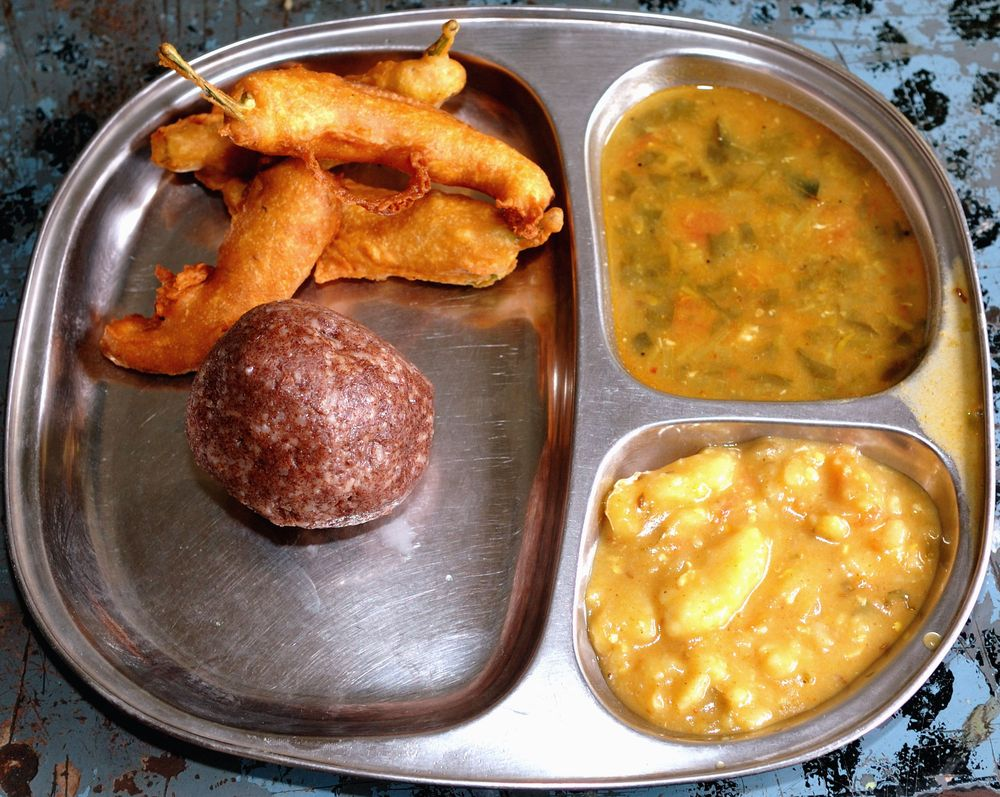
Ragi mudde and bhajji with sambar and chutney

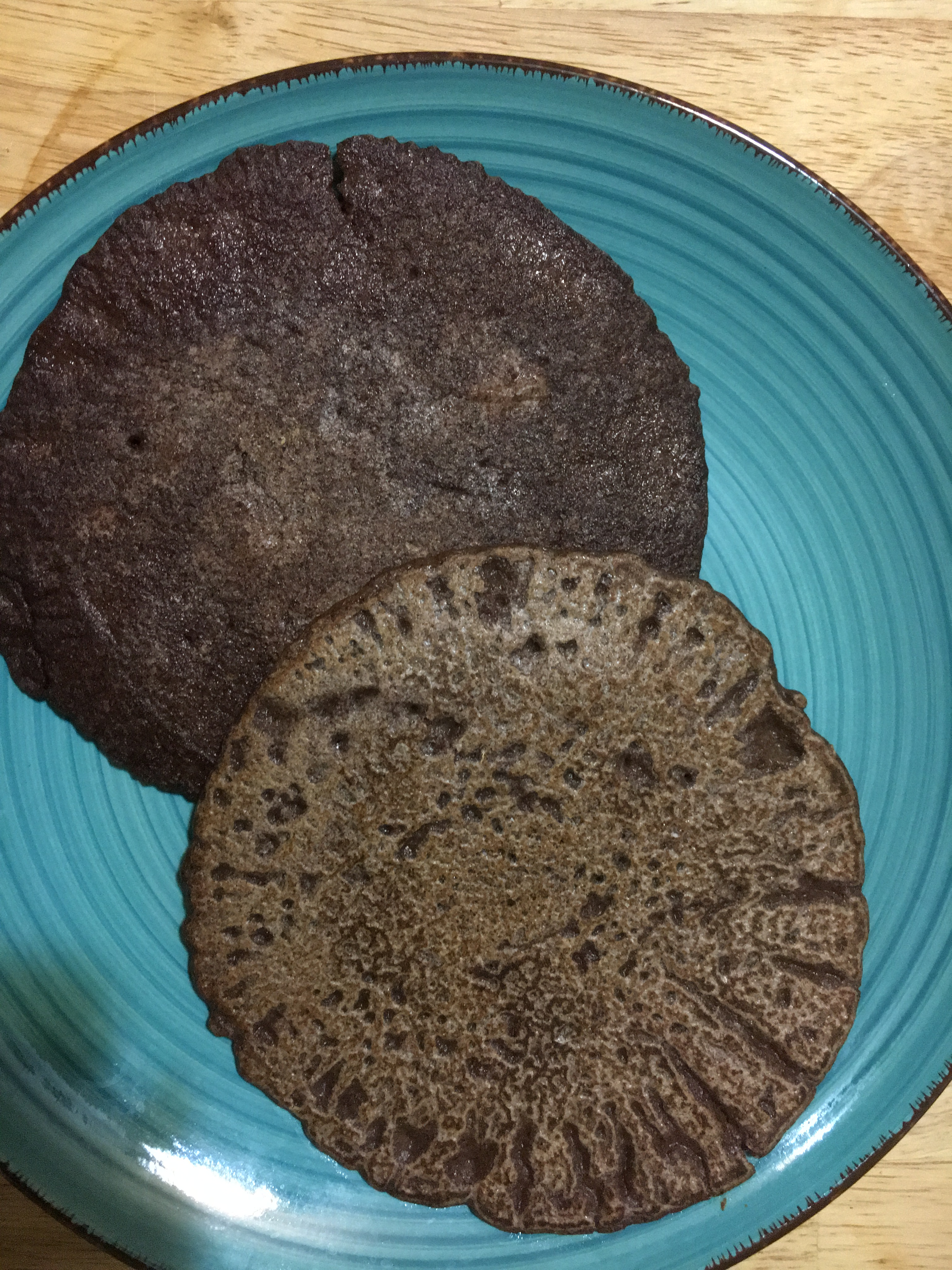
Roti

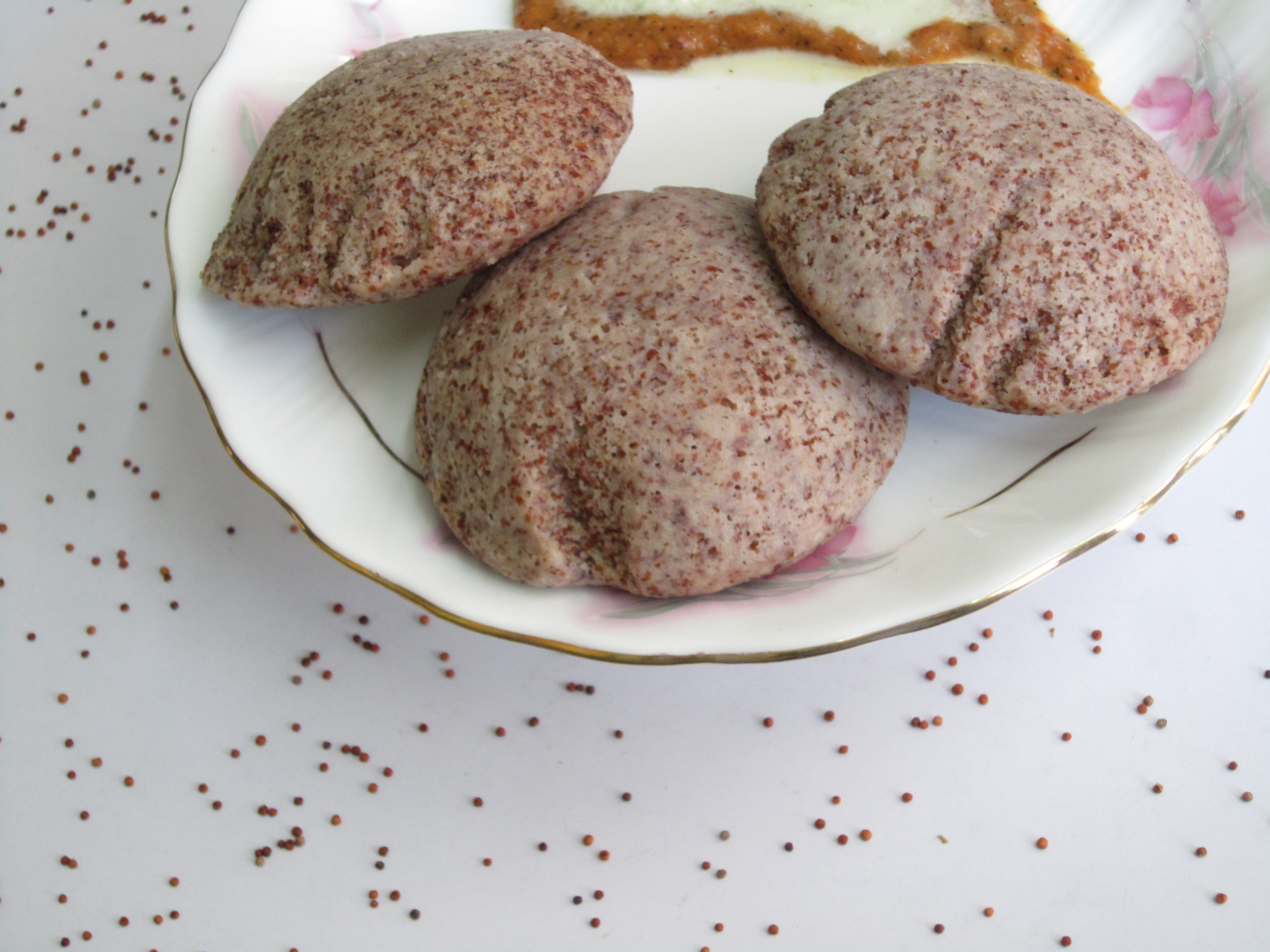
Ragi idli

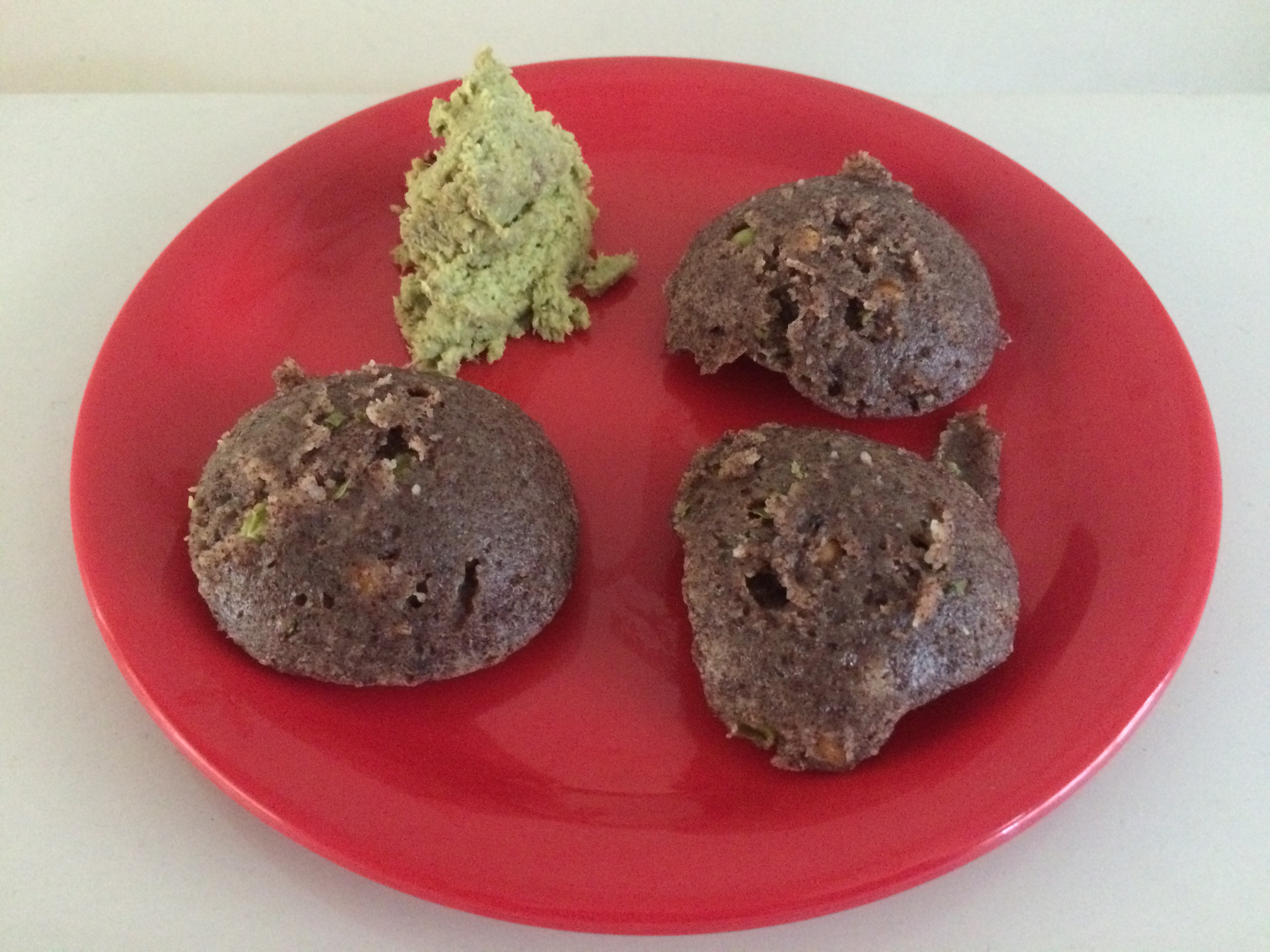
Idli, a South Indian breakfast dish made from ragi flour

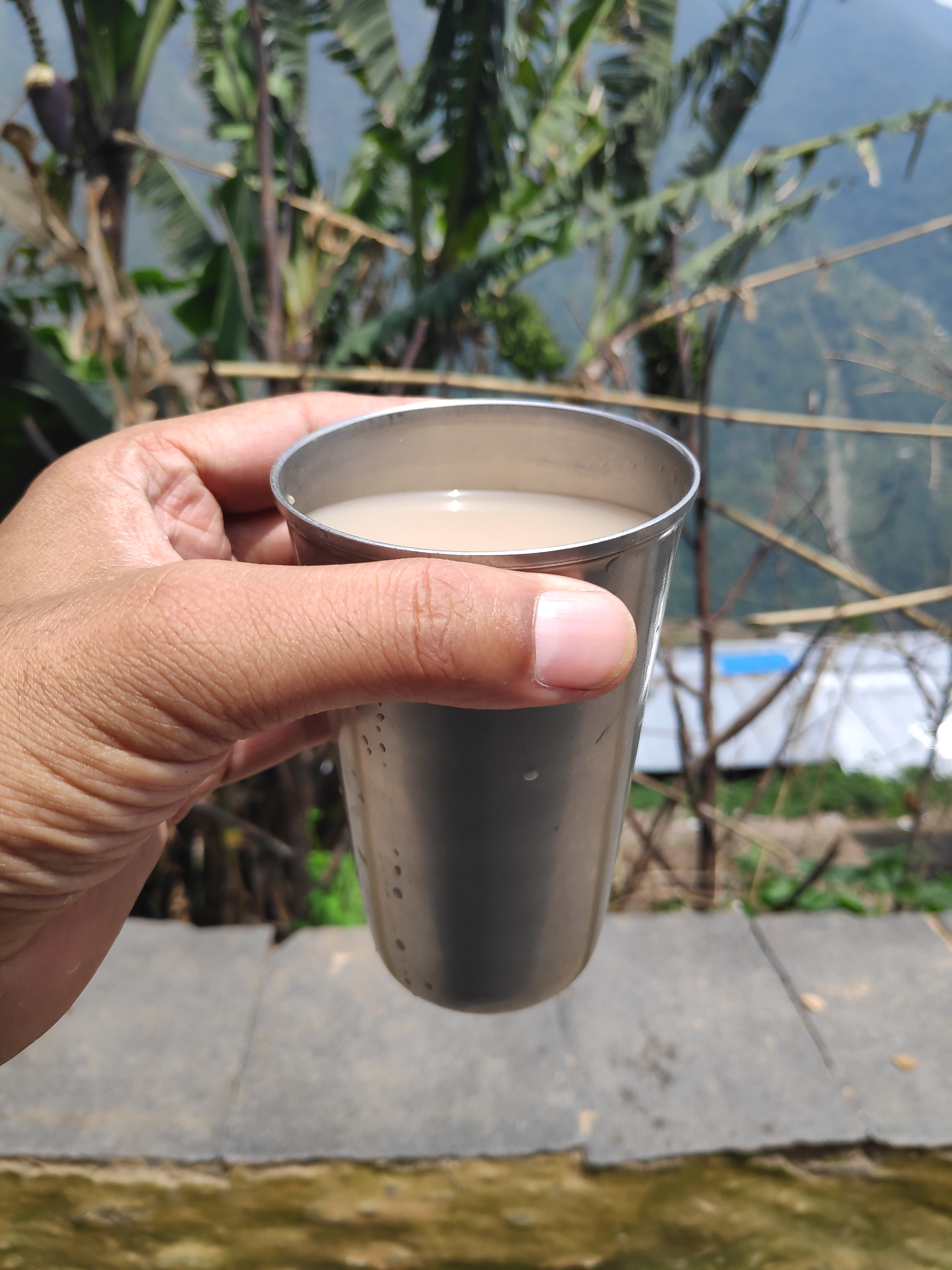
Chhaang

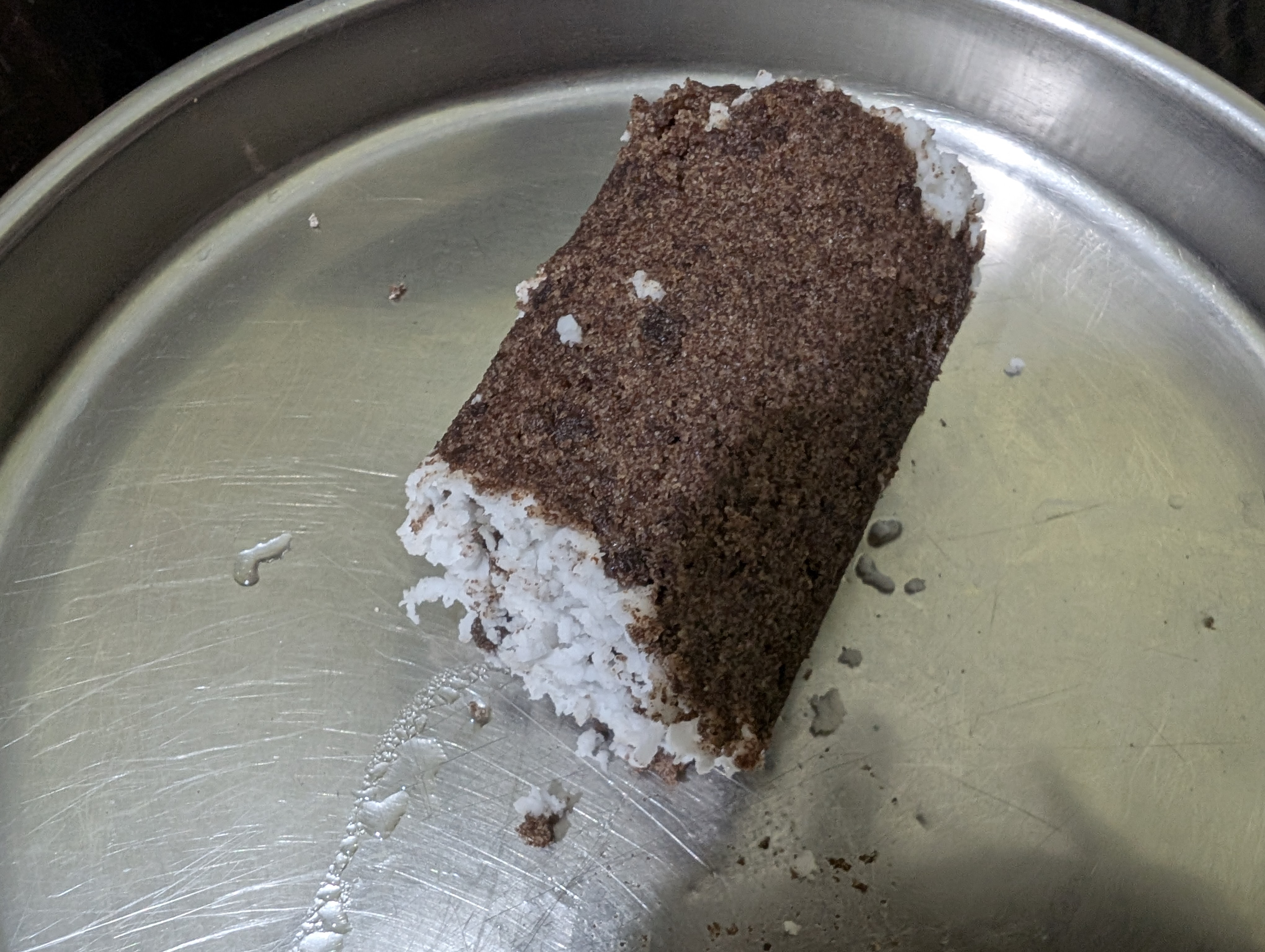
Puttu made of Finger millet
